= Salado Creek AVA =

American Viticultural Area in Stanislaus County, California

Coordinates: 37°26′19″N 121°08′28″W

Salado Creek
- Wine region
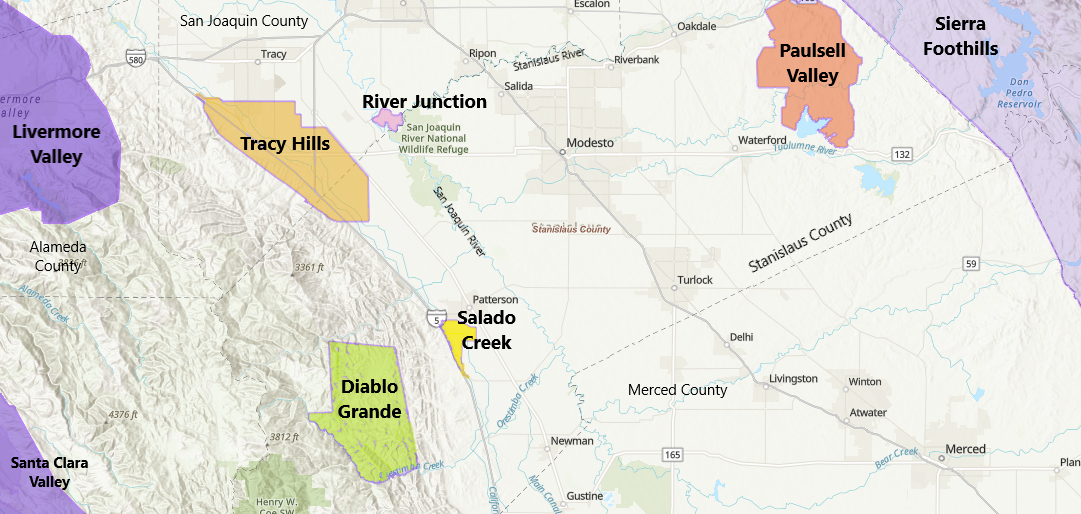
- Stanislaus County AVAs
- Type: American Viticultural Area
- Year established: 2004
- Country: United States
- Part of: California, Stanislaus County
- Other regions in California, Stanislaus County: Diablo Grande AVA, Paulsell Valley AVA, Tracy Hills AVA
- Growing season: 291 days
- Heat units: 2,130–5,562 GDD
- Precipitation (annual average): 13.33 in (339 mm)
- Soil conditions: fine sandy loam over deep loam subsoil w/parent material of sandstone and shale
- Total area: 2,940 acres (5 sq mi)
- Size of planted vineyards: 44 acres (18 ha)
- No. of vineyards: 1
- Grapes produced: Cabernet Sauvignon, Sauvignon blanc, Syrah, Viognier

Salado Creek is an American Viticultural Area (AVA) located in western Stanislaus County, California, on the edge of the Central Valley southwest of the town of Patterson. The wine appellation was established as the nation's 153^{rd}, the state's 92^{nd} and county's second AVA on June 29, 2004 by the Alcohol and Tobacco Tax and Trade Bureau (TTB), Treasury after reviewing the petition submitted by Stan Grant, Vineyard Consultant of Progressive Viticulture in Turlock, California, on behalf of Fred Vogel of the Sunflower Ranch Company in Patterson, California, proposing a viticultural area named "Salado Creek."
At the outset, the 2,940-acre (5 sq mi) viticultural area had 44 acres (18 ha) under vine situated around Salado Creek and the Little Salado Creek at the base of the Diablo Range. Most of the grapes were processed by KitFox Vineyards, using all custom-crush facility in Lodi. The plant hardiness zone is 9b. Currently, the AVA mostly consists of small grapegrowers sourcing contract wineries outside the area making vintages under a handful of labels.

== Name Evidence ==
Spanish explorer Gabriel Moraga named Salado Creek. Moraga, a Spanish army officer, explored the San Joaquin Valley during his 1806–1808 expeditions to the region and named many of its geographic features. The names Salado (Spanish pronunciation: [/saˈlaðog/] sə-LAH-doh) and Salado Creek continue to be used in modern times and are attached to a variety of features and places, both natural and man-made. As shown on the two official United States Geological Survey (USGS) maps that cover the viticultural area, the Patterson and Crows Landing quadrangles, Salado Creek is an intermittent stream that flows east from the higher elevations of the Diablo Mountains. After passing under Interstate 5, Salado Creek turns and flows north through the viticultural area and continues west and north of the town of Patterson. The USGS Patterson map shows Little Salado Creek running east from the Diablo Mountains to the viticultural area's southern tip, where Interstate 5 and the California Aqueduct interrupt its natural channel. On the USGS Crows Landing map, the creek is shown to resume southeast of the area where it runs northeast from the Delta-Mendota Canal. The Salado Sub-Station, south of Salado Creek and beside the California Aqueduct, is within the viticultural area. The Salado Creek Ranch, known for its walnuts, is within the established boundaries. Salado Avenue in Patterson is a major street that passes the town's post office, its branch library, a new school, and the city council's chambers. The local irrigation district was previously known as the Salado Irrigation District. Salado Creek is best known to local residents for its floods. Salado Creek History, an article published in The Gateway: A Patterson Township History Society Bulletin in December 1996, discusses the creek's significant floods. As noted in the article, the March 4, 1938, edition of the local Patterson Irrigator newspaper states that Salado Creek spilled over its banks and onto State Highway 33 on Patterson's east side. The article adds that a flood in November 1938 spilled into a local nursery.

== History ==
Salado Creek, and nearby Little Salado Creek, are among a few small, intermittent streams in western Stanislaus County that originate in the section of Coast Range that separates the San Joaquin Valley from the Livermore and Santa Clara valleys (the Diablo Range). During most winters little water flows through the creeks, but on rare occasions Salado Creek has swelled and flooded the city of Patterson, which lies on the flood plain downstream to the north of the proposed American Viticultural Area.

Waters from the creeks deposited sediments to form the alluvial fan that comprises the proposed American Viticultural Area. These sediments were the parent material for the deep, fertile Ensalado series (formerly Salado series) soils, which are unique to western Stanislaus County. Little is known about the prehistory of the Salado and Little Salado Creek areas. Sediments deposited by the creeks may have covered archeological evidence of habitation. Northern Valley Yokut and Costanoan peoples likely inhabited major tributaries to the San Joaquin River, including Salado Creek and Little Salado Creek, during different periods of time as their boundaries of habitation and activity fluctuated with the seasons and under external pressures from the Spanish. Agriculture is fairly recent in the Salado Creek area. The earliest attempt occurred after Mariano Hernandez received the 13,340-acre (5,400 ha) Rancho Del Puerto Land Grant in 1844. After Indian raids destroyed his herds of cattle he returned to San Jose and, in 1847, he sold the property. After this false start, agriculture began in earnest in 1864 after John D. Patterson purchased the former land grant and began raising cattle and Spanish Merino sheep. Livestock thrived on the abundant native and naturalized non-native grasses.

A rail line, developed in 1864 by the San Pueblo & Tulare Railroad, a subsidiary of the Central Pacific Railroad, facilitated export of agricultural products and precipitated the development of the city of Patterson. A boom in dry land grain production followed the railroad. The original Rancho Del Puerto Land Grant remained nearly intact until 1909 when John D. Patterson's heirs subdivided their land. In 1910 they began an irrigation company, one of the first to successfully lift water from a body of water, the San Joaquin River, for irrigation purposes. Following these events the character of agriculture in the area changed. Agriculture became more diversified and intensive as production shifted away from dry land grain and livestock towards high value crops such as apricots, peaches, walnuts, almonds, prunes, and grapes. Recent technological advances in food processing and transportation (drying, canning, refrigerated rail cars) contributed to changes and growth in agriculture. Accompanying these changes in agriculture was the movement of people from communities centered on transportation links to farmland. In past years, almonds, walnuts, sod, tomatoes and other row crops have been prominent in the Salado Creek-Little Salado Creek area. Wine grapes returned with a forty-four-acre (18 ha) planting in 2000 that, as a testament to the suitability of the area, produced their first crop in 2001. Current varieties include Cabernet Sauvignon, Syrah, Sauvignon Blanc, and Viognier. The 2001 Sauvignon Blanc was submitted to the California State Fair in 2002 and won a bronze medal. Ground breaking for a winery within the Salado Creek American Viticultural Area occurred within the next couple of months.

== Terroir ==
=== Topography ===
The Salado Creek viticultural area lies on the western side of the San Joaquin Valley at the foot of the Diablo Mountains, which are part of California Coast Ranges. The viticultural area is between 125 and 340 feet (38 and 104 m) above sea level and generally flat with a gentle downward slope to the northeast, toward the San Joaquin River. A number of man-made canals, ditches, and drains cross the area's boundary. The California Aqueduct and the Delta-Mendota Canal, for example, flow from the northwest to the southeast across the Salado Creek viticultural area. Salado Creek is the major natural watercourse for the Salado Creek viticultural area. As an intermittent stream, it begins in the Diablo Mountain Range to the area's west and runs east in its natural channel from the mountains to the California Aqueduct. After crossing the Aqueduct at the foot of the Diablos, the creek flows north and then northeasterly across the gently sloping floor of the San Joaquin Valley. After crossing the Delta-Mendota Canal in a flume, it enters a man-made channel that carries it north from the viticultural area and then east around the heart of Patterson. Finally, Salado Creek enters large drainpipes at State Route 33, which take its water to the San Joaquin River. Another intermittent stream, Little Salado Creek, starts in the Diablo range south of Salado Creek. It meanders east in its natural channel to the southern tip of the viticultural area at Interstate 5 and Fink Road. The creek then enters a series of man-made drains and channels as it flows northeast across the valley floor outside of the viticultural area, south of Patterson. The Salado Creek viticultural area covers the upper portion and back slope of the alluvial fan created by Salado and Little Salado Creeks. The two creeks created the fan where they left the steep slopes of the Diablo Mountains and their flow velocity diminished as they entered the much gentler slopes of the San Joaquin Valley. This drop in velocity allowed the coarser, heavier sediments to settle out and formed the creeks' alluvial fan at the foot of the Diablos. The two streams carried finer, lighter sediments further downstream to the flood plain of the San Joaquin River. The coarser, heavier sediments of the alluvial fan became the parent material for the Ensalado soils found within the viticultural area boundaries.

=== Climate ===
The Salado Creek viticultural area lies on the west side of the San Joaquin Valley at the foot of the Diablo Mountains. This range shields the area from the maritime influences of the Pacific Ocean. Also, the Salado Creek area is in a "thermal belt," which covers the alluvial fans along the western rim of the valley in Stanislaus County. Consistent breezes from the north, which cool the area in the summer, characterize this thermal belt. In the winter it has less fog and warmer temperatures than the valley's lower elevations along the San Joaquin River. The petition included a recent comparison of weather information gathered from stations north, within, and south of the Salado Creek viticultural area. It has warmer minimum temperatures and cooler maximum temperatures, for a milder climate, than the surrounding areas. Minimum temperatures are higher in May, June, and August through October. Maximum temperatures are cooler August through December. These periods of comparatively mild temperatures correspond to the ripening season for wine grapes. Solar radiation statistics for 2001 indicate less solar influence between August and October in the viticultural area, creating a slower ripening period for the grapes. The area's low humidity, high average wind speeds, and high average solar radiation create a high rate of moisture evaporation from the plants and soil. This slow ripening, and the continuing high rate of evaporation for plants and soil, has a positive effect on the quality of grapes grown in the area. The USDA plant hardiness zone is 9b.

=== Soils ===
The Ensalado series soils, formerly known as the Salado series, are unique to west Stanislaus County, California, according to a 2001 publication by soil scientist, vineyard consultant, and Salado Creek petition author Stan Grant. He further notes that this soil series occurs only along three streams in the area, Salado, Orestimba, and Del Puerto Creeks, and accounts for only 0.17 percent of the soils covering western Stanislaus County. Mr. Grant notes in the petition that because of their lower flow velocity, Salado Creek and Little Salado Creek dropped large quantities of sediment immediately after leaving the Diablo Mountains. This produced the large alluvial fan upon which the Salado Creek viticultural area sits. The Orestimba and Del Puerto Creeks, with their higher flow rates, took their sediments further to the east, producing smaller alluvial fans at the foot of the mountains. The Ensalado soils are very deep, with a root depth of 60 in (1,500 mm) or more. They are well drained, with parent material from sandstone and shale, and have little organic matter. They have limited layer development due to the dry, warm climate, and are calcareous. Classified as coarse-loamy, these soils generally consist of a thin layer of fine sandy loam over deep loam subsoil. Other soils on the alluvial fan, older than the Ensalado soils, lie beyond the courses of Salado and Little Salado Creeks.
