= Diablo Grande AVA =

American Viticultural Area in Stanislaus County, California

Coordinates: 37°24′08″N 121°15′35″W

Diablo Grande
- Wine region
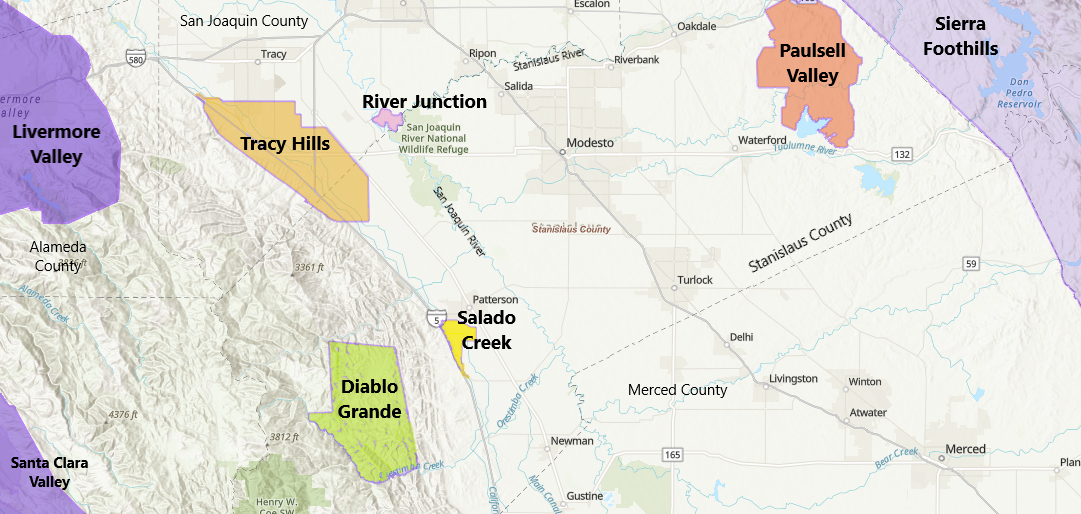
- Stanislaus County AVAs
- Type: American Viticultural Area
- Year established: 1998
- Country: United States
- Part of: California, Stanislaus County
- Other regions in California, Stanislaus County: Tracy Hills AVA, Salado Creek AVA, Paulsell Valley AVA
- Growing season: 291 days
- Climate region: Region I-V
- Heat units: 2,130–5,562 GDD
- Precipitation (annual average): 14.65 in (372 mm)
- Soil conditions: Arburua, Wisflat sandy, Contra Costa clay, and San Timoteo sandy loams
- Total area: 30,000 acres (47 sq mi)
- Size of planted vineyards: 52 acres (21 ha)
- No. of vineyards: 1
- Grapes produced: Barbera, Cabernet Sauvignon, Chardonnay, Merlot, Pinot noir, Sangiovese, Sauvignon Blanc, Syrah
- No. of wineries: 1

Diablo Grande is the initial American Viticultural Area (AVA) located in Stanislaus County, California surrounding the unincorporated community of Diablo Grande. The wine appellation was established as the nation's 141st and the state's 80th AVA on June 22, 1998, by the Bureau of Alcohol, Tobacco and Firearms (ATF), Treasury after reviewing the petition submitted by Dr. Vincent E. Petrucci, Sc.D., on behalf of the Diablo Grande Limited Partnership, proposing a new viticultural area located in the western foothills of Stanislaus County, California, to be known as "Diablo Grande."

The entire 30,000-acre (47 sq mi) viticultural area uniquely is private property owned by the Diablo Grande Resort Community, as a gated-residential community including the Legends West at Diablo Grande 18-hole golf course designed by Jack Nicklaus. Its resident vineyards are located at elevations between 1,000 and 1,800 feet (300 and 550 m) above sea level and Isom Ranch Winery solely uses the Diablo Grande appellation on its labels. The plant hardiness zones are 9b and 10a.

== History ==
"Diablo Grande" (/djaβlo ˈɣɾande/ dya-blo-gran-de) is the name of the destination resort and residential community that occupies the viticultural area. The petitioner stated that this name was given to the area because of its proximity to Mount Diablo, the highest peak of the Pacific Coast mountain range. Mount Diablo is located 38 to 40 miles (61–64 km) due north of the proposed area. The petitioner emphasized the fact that the proposed area lies in the Diablo Mountain Range, which extends from Mount Diablo State Park in Contra Costa County to the south of and beyond the Diablo Grande viticultural area located in Stanislaus County. There is evidence that the name, "Diablo Grande," has become associated with the area by both the residents of California, and perhaps the nation, as a result of the development of the destination resort and residential community in existence since the early 1990s. As evidence that the area is known as "Diablo Grande," the petitioner submitted copies of 21 newspaper articles that discuss the development of the resort. With the exception of the Golf Course Report, Alexandria, Virginia, all of the articles are from local California newspapers. There is also evidence that the area occupied by the resort was historically known as the "Oak Flats Valley." A working ranch, known as the Oak Flats Valley Ranch once occupied this land. Many of the newspaper articles submitted by the petitioner refer to the area as the "Oak Flats Valley Ranch" or the "Oak Flats Valley." No evidence was provided that the area was tied to Mount Diablo prior to the development of the resort. Accordingly, ATF solicited comments in Notice No. 853 on whether the use of the name "Diablo Grande" was proper for this area. No comments were received on this issue. Consequently, based on the evidence submitted by the petitioner, ATF agreed the name "Diablo Grande" is associated with the area.

== Terroir ==
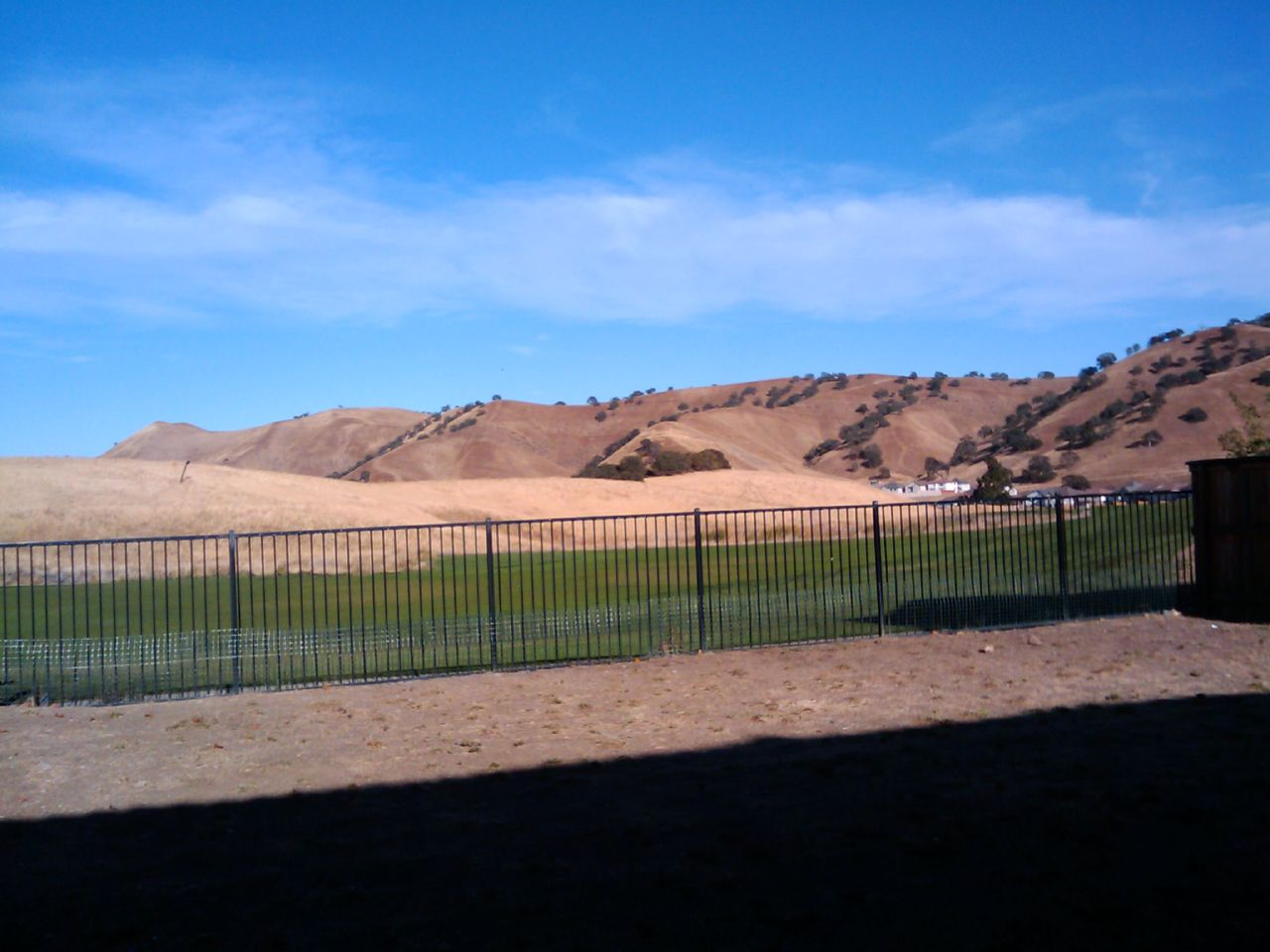
Diablo Grande

=== Topography ===
The geography of the viticultural area sets it apart from the surrounding areas in several respects. Three main water courses traverse the area: Salado Creek, Crow Creek, and Orestimba Creek. Salado and Crow Creek traverse the area from the vicinity of Mikes Peak along the western boundary of the viticultural area, northeast and east respectively, toward Interstate 5. Orestimba Creek traverses the southwestern and southern boundary line as it flows eastward. Current vineyard plantings are at elevations ranging from 1,000 feet (300 m) mean sea level (msl) near the vineyard located in the vicinity of the Oak Flat Ranch to 1,800 feet (550 m) msl at the Isom Ranch. These vineyard site elevations are the highest elevations where grapes are grown in Stanislaus County. This contrasts with other Stanislaus County vineyards outside the "Diablo Grande" viticultural area where grapes are grown at elevations ranging from 70 to 90 feet (21–27 m) at Modesto to 300 to 350 feet (91–107 m) at the base of the foothills near Patterson where a newly planted vineyard (1996) of 90 acres (36 ha) exists approximately 4.2 miles (6.8 km) east of the viticultural area boundary. The petitioner distinguishes this vineyard site from the "Diablo Grande" viticultural area by noting that the Patterson site is 340 feet (100 m) lower and has a soil type which is all Vernalis-Zacharias complex with 0% to 2% slopes.
The topographic features of the viticultural area include many "mini-valleys" as a result of its mountainous structure. This provides several attributes not found in the vineyards planted on the flat lands in the interior of Stanislaus County. Grapes grown on the terraced hillsides of the viticultural area are subject to a mesoclimate (or topoclimate or site climate) which can vary from the general macroclimate due to differences mainly in elevation and slope. Thus, site selection becomes an important feature when working with this type of topography as contrasted to the flat lands of 1% to 2% slopes. There is the opportunity to grow grapes on slopes (15%–30%) that have western, eastern, southern, or northern exposure or any combination of all four slope exposures. The petitioner provided a diagram purporting to show how mesoclimates are influenced by sloping contour topography. The southern and western slopes receive a greater exposure to sunshine and, therefore, accumulate more heat units than the northern or eastern slopes. It is this difference in sunshine and heat that makes the viticultural area's mesoclimate. According to the petitioner, grapes grown on all four slope exposures, when harvested together and crushed as one lot, make wines that differ considerably from grapes grown on the lower elevation flat lands. The petitioner claims that this is the key factor which makes the viticultural area wines distinct from those of the surrounding area. In support of this claim the petitioner provided several letters from staff members at the Viticulture and Enology Research Center, California State University, Fresno and winemakers. These letters indicate that wines made from grapes grown in the "Diablo Grande" viticultural area exhibit characteristics distinctive enough to deserve consideration for a specific appellation. ATF has concluded that there is sufficient evidence to establish the "Diablo Grande," as a distinct viticultural area.

=== Climate ===
The petitioner provided a table of heat summation in degree days illustrating the contrast in temperature between the viticultural area and areas immediately outside the viticultural area. The data was taken from four separate weather stations located in Newman, (10 miles (16 km) west), Westley (10 miles (16 km)) north), Tracy (25 miles (40 km) north) and Modesto (30 miles (48 km) northeast). The petitioner chose these areas because they were the closest areas with climate records. According to the table, the "Diablo Grande" viticultural area is 384 degree days warmer than Modesto, 191 degree days cooler than Newman, 243 degree days cooler that Tracy, and 1022 degree days cooler than Westley. The petitioner submitted a four-year record of rainfall spanning from 1992 to 1995 for the viticultural area. The petitioner also provided a table illustrating the contrast in monthly and annual rainfall in inches between the "Diablo Grande" viticultural area and areas immediately outside of the viticultural area. The rainfall data shows that the "Diablo Grande" viticultural area has an annual rainfall 13.8% to 22.6% higher that the other four areas (Newman, Westley, Modesto, and Tracy). The higher rainfall in the viticultural area is due to its higher elevation (800 to 2,600 feet (240 to 790 m)) as compared to the other four areas which range in elevation from 40 to 300 feet (12 to 91 m). Rainfall generally occurs during the winter in all five areas, with little or no rainfall during the summer months. Due to its elevation and the protective mountains, the viticultural area lies above the fog belt in contrast with areas immediately outside of the viticultural area. In the Newman, Patterson, and Westley areas, fog is a common occurrence throughout the rainy season in all but the foothill regions. The predominant wind directions are from northeast to northwest in the "Diablo Grande" viticultural area due to the orientation of the many mini-valleys encompassing the area and the wind deflection caused by the hills surrounding these mini-valleys. This is a unique feature of the viticultural area's micro-climate as contrasted with the Newman/Westley areas where the reverse is true with the predominant winds coming from the northwest, typical of the flat lands outside of the viticultural area's perimeter.

=== Soil ===
The soil characteristics of the "Diablo Grande" viticultural area are not only different and distinct from those of the lower foothills and Central Valley to the east and north, but they are also different from other areas of the Diablo Range to the south and west of the viticultural area. The petitioner provided a general description of the soils in the form of a report entitled, "Diablo Grande Specific Plan Draft Environmental Impact Report" prepared by LSA Associates, Inc., Point Richmond, California for the Stanislaus County Department of Planning and Community Development. The petitioner also submitted a report from the Soil Conservation Service which recently mapped soils within the viticultural area and identified 16 major soil types. Extensive soil sampling and detailed analysis (both physical and chemical) have been conducted at two different locations within the viticultural area. In December 1989, thirteen samples were taken at various sites in the vicinity of the Oak Flat Ranch. In May 1996, fourteen samples from Isom Ranch were collected and analyzed. A copy of this analysis was included with the petition. These reports show that a majority of the soils found in the "Diablo Grande" viticultural area are composed of the following series listed in approximate order of occurrence: Arburua loam, Wisflat sandy loam, Contra Costa clay loam, and San Timoteo sandy loam, with lesser amounts of Zacharias clay loam and gravelly clay loam. Most of the soils are complexes made up of two or more of these series as well as occasional rock outcrops of exposed sandstone and shale. In these complexes, the soil series are so intimately intermixed that it is not practical to separate them geographically. The reports show that the soils within the viticultural area typically have slopes ranging from 30% to 75% and elevations from 400 to 2,700 feet (120 to 820 m). An exception is the relatively minor Zacharias series which has slopes of 2% to 5% and elevations of 200 to 400 feet (61 to 122 m). The soils in the viticultural area are derived from sandstone and vary from shallow to very deep with most of the complexes showing moderate depth. The soils are well-drained to somewhat excessively-drained. Permeability varies from slow to moderately rapid, surface run-off rates are rapid and, according to the petitioner, the potential for water erosion can be severe. The petitioner provided a table giving a complete description of the characteristics for each soil type. In contrast to the soils of the viticultural area, the soils of the surrounding areas are largely composed of different soil series with different characteristics, including elevations and slopes. The petitioner provided an exhibit defining the various soil series and soil types, and an exhibit with aerial photographic maps showing soil type location by map numbers. While most of the soil series which are found within the "Diablo Grande" viticultural area can also be found in the nearby surrounding areas, these series represent very small portions of the total in those surrounding areas. Additionally, many of the soil series which make up the major soil types of the surrounding areas are not found at all within the viticultural area. These soil types include Capay clay, Vernalis clay loam, Stomar clay loam, Chaqua clay loam, Calla clay loam, Carbona clay, Alo clay, Vaquero clay, El Salado loam and fine sandy loam. These series are found to the east and north of the viticultural area. Most of these series have slopes of 0% to 2% and elevations of 25 to 400 feet with four of these series having slopes up to 8%, 15%, 30%, and 50% respectively and elevations from 300 to 1,600 feet (91 to 488 m). There is another major difference between the "Diablo Grande" viticultural area soils and most of those to the east and north. The "Diablo Grande" soils are residual soils formed from sedimentary deposits of sandstone and calcareous sandstone while most of the surrounding soils are from alluvial deposits of mixed rock parent material having lower slopes and elevations. The area surrounding the "Diablo Grande" viticultural area to the west and south includes the Orestimba Creek Canyon beyond which lies a more rugged portion of the Diablo Range. Much of the land directly west of the viticultural area is part of the Henry W. Coe State Park and although this area includes some of the same soil series as the "Diablo Grande" viticultural area, there are also many new series including Gonzaga clay, Honker clay, Franciscan clay loam, Vellecitos clay, Gaviota gravelly loam, Henneke clay, Hentine loam, and Hytop clay. These soils generally have slopes of 30% to 75% and elevations of 700 to 3,300 feet (210 to 1,010 m).
