= Moraga, California =

City in California, United States

- Town
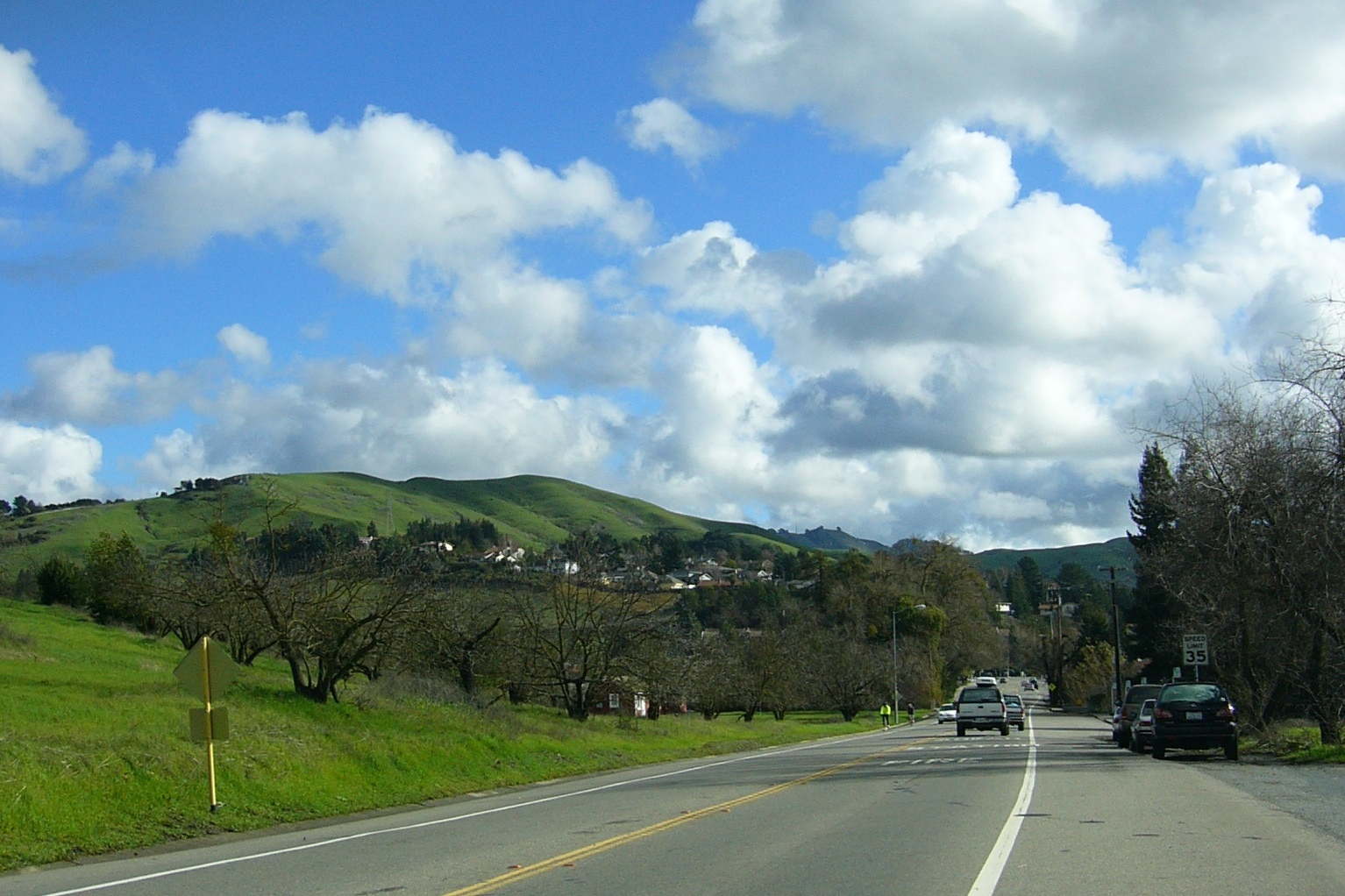
- Interactive map of Moraga, California
- Location in California Location in the United States
- Coordinates: 37°50′06″N 122°07′47″W
- Country: United States
- State: California
- County: Contra Costa
- Incorporated: November 13, 1974

Government
  - Mayor: Kerry Hillis
  - State Senator: Tim Grayson (D)
  - State Assembly: Rebecca Bauer-Kahan (D)
  - U. S. Congress: Mark DeSaulnier (D)

Area
  - Total: 9.47 sq mi (24.53 km^{2})
  - Land: 9.46 sq mi (24.50 km^{2})
  - Water: 0.0077 sq mi (0.02 km^{2}) 0.09%
- Elevation: 499 ft (152 m)

Population (2020)
  - Total: 16,870
  - Density: 1,783/sq mi (688.6/km^{2})
- Time zone: UTC-8 (PST)
  - Summer (DST): UTC-7 (PDT)
- ZIP codes: 94556, 94570, 94575
- Area code: 925
- FIPS code: 06-49187 (formerly 06-49194)
- GNIS feature IDs: 1659171, 2413013
- Website: www.moraga.ca.us

Moraga is a town in Contra Costa County, California, United States. Located in the San Francisco Bay Area, the town is named in honor of Joaquín Moraga, member of the famed Californio family. As of 2020, Moraga had a total population of 16,870 people. Moraga is the home of Saint Mary's College of California.

== History ==
The land now called Moraga was first inhabited by the Saklan people, who belonged to the Bay Miwok language group.

Joaquin Moraga was the grandson of José Joaquín Moraga, builder of the Presidio of San Francisco and founder of the pueblo that grew into the city of San Jose. Joaquin's father Gabriel Moraga was also a soldier, and an early explorer who named many of the state's rivers, including the Sacramento and San Joaquin.

Moraga is located on the 1835 Mexican Land Grant Rancho Laguna de los Palos Colorados given to Joaquin Moraga and his cousin, Juan Bernal. Part of that grant was the property today known as Moraga Ranch. The Moraga Adobe has been preserved and is located in neighboring Orinda. Joaquin Moraga Intermediate School, a middle school in Moraga, bears his name.

In the first half of the 20th century, the line of the Sacramento Northern Railroad ran through Moraga; much of the old right-of-way is now part of the Lafayette-Moraga Regional Trail.

Moraga's first post office opened in 1886, and was closed in 1887; it reopened in 1915. In 1955, Moraga built a new post office. Saint Mary's College of California moved to Moraga in 1928. Moraga incorporated in 1974, when the communities of Moraga Town, Rheem, and Rheem Valley, united into one town.

In June 2017, Moraga declared a fiscal emergency because a sinkhole in the downtown area and a failed bridge on Canyon Road were expected to cost $5 million to repair.

== Geography ==
Moraga is located adjacent to the cities of Lafayette and Orinda, as well as the unincorporated community of Canyon. Other nearby cities include Walnut Creek, Oakland, San Francisco, Concord and Berkeley.

According to the United States Census Bureau, the town has a total area of 9.5 square miles (24.5 km^{2}), of which 99.91% is land and 0.09% is water. Moraga is in a valley surrounded by rolling hills. Large sections of the Lafayette-Moraga Regional Trail pass through the town.

=== Climate ===
Moraga has a Mediterranean climate, with warm, dry summers and cool, wet winters. In the summer, morning fog is a common occurrence, but it usually burns off by the late morning or early afternoon, giving way to clear skies the rest of the day. Most of the annual rainfall comes during the winter; snow is very rare, but occasional light dustings have been seen. Over the course of a year, the town averages 26 days of 90 °F (32 °C) or higher, 40 nights of 32 °F (0 °C) or lower, and 59 days with rain. In 2014, the southwestern US was plagued by a serious drought. Moraga was badly burdened, with high fire warnings.

Moraga

Climate chart (precipitation, max. and min. temperature)
J	F	M	A	M	J	J	A	S	O	N	D
6.1 53 35	4.3 58 38	3.7 62 39	2 67 42	0.6 72 47	0.2 77 51	0.1 82 54	0.1 81 54	0.3 81 52	1.6 73 46	3.6 62 40	5 54 36
- █ Average max. and min. temperatures in °F
- █ Precipitation totals in inches
- Source: WRCC
Metric conversion
J	F	M	A	M	J	J	A	S	O	N	D
155 12 2	109 15 3	95 17 4	50 19 5	16 22 8	4.1 25 10	1.3 28 12	1.8 27 12	6.4 27 11	41 23 8	91 17 4	126 12 2
- █ Average max. and min. temperatures in °C
- █ Precipitation totals in mm

Climate data for Moraga, California (Saint Mary's College)
Month	Jan	Feb	Mar	Apr	May	Jun	Jul	Aug	Sep	Oct	Nov	Dec	Year
Record high °F (°C)	69 (21)	74 (23)	87 (31)	90 (32)	98 (37)	108 (42)	110 (43)	105 (41)	109 (43)	96 (36)	85 (29)	73 (23)	110 (43)
Mean daily maximum °F (°C)	53.1 (11.7)	58.1 (14.5)	61.7 (16.5)	66.8 (19.3)	71.5 (21.9)	77.3 (25.2)	81.9 (27.7)	81.0 (27.2)	80.5 (26.9)	72.7 (22.6)	61.9 (16.6)	54.0 (12.2)	68.4 (20.2)
Daily mean °F (°C)	44.1 (6.7)	48.0 (8.9)	50.4 (10.2)	54.3 (12.4)	59.0 (15.0)	64.1 (17.8)	67.7 (19.8)	67.5 (19.7)	66.3 (19.1)	59.4 (15.2)	50.8 (10.4)	45.0 (7.2)	56.4 (13.5)
Mean daily minimum °F (°C)	35.1 (1.7)	37.9 (3.3)	39.1 (3.9)	41.7 (5.4)	46.5 (8.1)	50.8 (10.4)	53.6 (12.0)	53.9 (12.2)	52.1 (11.2)	46.2 (7.9)	39.6 (4.2)	36.0 (2.2)	44.4 (6.9)
Record low °F (°C)	18 (−8)	19 (−7)	22 (−6)	28 (−2)	32 (0)	37 (3)	42 (6)	40 (4)	35 (2)	28 (−2)	19 (−7)	14 (−10)	14 (−10)
Average precipitation inches (mm)	6.12 (155)	4.28 (109)	3.74 (95)	1.98 (50)	0.62 (16)	0.16 (4.1)	0.05 (1.3)	0.07 (1.8)	0.25 (6.4)	1.63 (41)	3.59 (91)	4.98 (126)	27.47 (696.6)
Average precipitation days (≥ 0.01 in)	10	9	9	5	3	1	0	1	1	4	7	9	59
Source: Western Regional Climate Center

== Demographics ==
Historical population
Census	Pop.	Note	%±
1970	14,205		—
1980	15,014		5.7%
1990	15,852		5.6%
2000	16,290		2.8%
2010	16,016		−1.7%
2020	16,870		5.3%
U.S. Decennial Census

=== 2020 census ===
As of the 2020 census, Moraga had a population of 16,870. The population density was 1,783.1 inhabitants per square mile (688.5/km^{2}). The census reported that 91.2% of the population lived in households, 8.6% lived in non-institutionalized group quarters, and 0.3% were institutionalized. 99.8% of residents lived in urban areas, while 0.2% lived in rural areas.

The age distribution was 21.9% under the age of 18, 15.8% aged 18 to 24, 14.8% aged 25 to 44, 27.5% aged 45 to 64, and 20.1% who were 65 years of age or older. The median age was 42.9 years. For every 100 females, there were 92.5 males, and for every 100 females age 18 and over, there were 89.7 males age 18 and over.

There were 5,698 households, out of which 37.4% included children under the age of 18. Of all households, 67.0% were married-couple households, 2.8% were cohabiting couple households, 20.1% had a female householder with no spouse or partner present, and 10.2% had a male householder with no spouse or partner present. 17.6% of households were one person, and 11.3% were one person aged 65 or older. The average household size was 2.7. There were 4,477 families (78.6% of all households).

There were 5,932 housing units at an average density of 627.0 units per square mile (242.1 units/km^{2}). Of these, 5,698 (96.1%) were occupied; 81.2% of occupied units were owner-occupied and 18.8% were occupied by renters. 3.9% of housing units were vacant. The homeowner vacancy rate was 1.0%, and the rental vacancy rate was 4.7%.

Racial composition as of the 2020 census
Race	Number	Percent
White	10,877	64.5%
Black or African American	211	1.3%
American Indian and Alaska Native	42	0.2%
Asian	3,182	18.9%
Native Hawaiian and Other Pacific Islander	42	0.2%
Some other race	427	2.5%
Two or more races	2,089	12.4%
Hispanic or Latino (of any race)	1,652	9.8%

=== Income and poverty ===
In 2023, the US Census Bureau estimated that the median household income was $199,800, and the per capita income was $89,439. About 3.2% of families and 8.4% of the population were below the poverty line.

== Arts and culture ==
The Moraga Library of the Contra Costa County Library is located along Saint Marys Road in Moraga.

== Government ==
As of February 10, 2019, Moraga has 11,024 voters with 4,737 (43%) registered Democrats, 2,766 (25.1%) registered Republicans and 3,105 (28.2%) independent voters.

Moraga vote by party in presidential elections
Year	Democratic	Republican
2024	74.9% 7,049	21.6% 2,033
2020	75.5% 7,760	22.2% 2,287
2016	69.5% 6,071	23.7% 2,071
2012	58.7% 5,244	39.0% 3,487
2008	62.9% 5,932	35.3% 3,324
2004	56.3% 5,062	42.6% 3,835
2000	47.5% 4,129	48.1% 4,184
1996	44.8% 3,831	48.2% 4,126
1992	40.4% 3,839	41.3% 3,926
1988	34.9% 3,226	64.3% 5,953
1984	27.0% 2,253	72.2% 6,021
1980	20.1% 1,490	67.0% 4,972
1976	26.4% 1,877	72.7% 5,177

== Education ==
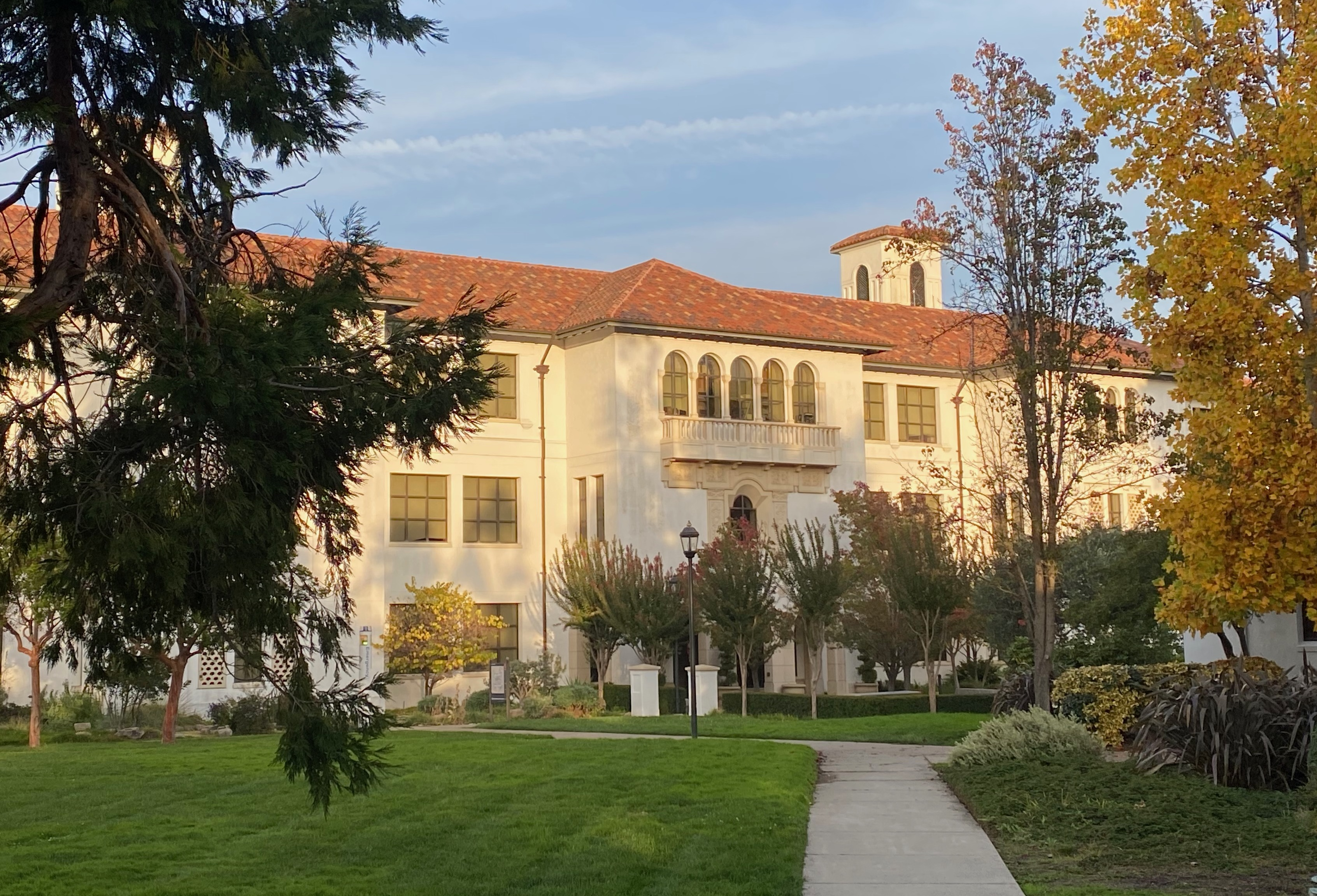
Saint Mary's College of California

Moraga is home to the grade schools of Los Perales Elementary, Donald L. Rheem School, Camino Pablo School, and Joaquin Moraga Intermediate School; Campolindo High School; and Saint Mary's College of California, a private college. In 2011, Moraga was named a top city to live and learn in.

=== Primary and secondary schools ===
The majority of Moraga is in the Moraga School District. That district includes:

- Camino Pablo Elementary School, grades K–5
- Los Perales Elementary School, grades K–5
- Donald L. Rheem Elementary School, grades K–5
- Joaquin Moraga Intermediate School, grades 6–8

A small section of Moraga is in Orinda Union Elementary School District.

All of Moraga is in the Acalanes Union High School District. That district includes:

- Campolindo High School, grades 9–12

The Saklan School (formerly known as Saklan Valley School and The Carden School of Moraga), a private elementary school founded in 1954, is also located in Moraga. It is a co-educational school with around 155 students from preschool to 8th grade. The school is accredited by the California Association of Independent Schools (a member of the National Association of Independent Schools), and the Western Association of Schools and Colleges. It has a maximum class size of 16.

Moraga's only public high school is Campolindo High School, although some Moraga students choose to attend Miramonte High School, located just across the town border in Orinda. Both schools are part of the Acalanes Union High School District, which encompasses Moraga, Lafayette, Orinda, and parts of Walnut Creek.

Moraga was home to Orion Academy, a private secondary school for students with conditions such as autism, attention deficit-hyperactivity disorder (ADHD), and nonverbal learning disorder until it relocated to Concord in 2022.

=== Colleges and universities ===
Saint Mary's College of California is located just northeast of downtown Moraga; it is a Catholic university with 3,962 undergraduate and postgraduate students in the 2007–2008 school year. The college was originally located in San Francisco and then Oakland, but moved to Moraga in 1928.

== Notable people ==
- Conrad Bassett-Bouchard, North American Scrabble champion
- Matt Biondi, Olympic gold medalist (swimming)
- Corbin Burnes, Major League Baseball pitcher; attended St. Mary's College
- Rajiv Chandrasekaran, journalist, author; was raised in Moraga
- Hans Florine, speed climber
- Will Forte, actor, comedian and writer
- Still Woozy, singer and songwriter
- George Harrison, 1960 Olympic gold medalist and world record holder (swimming)
- Erika Henningsen, lead performer in Tony Award nominated musical, Mean Girls; voice of Charlie Morningstar in Hazbin Hotel on Amazon Prime Video
- Cary and Michael Huang, creators of the animated web series Battle for Dream Island and the interactive visualization tool The Scale of the Universe.
- Daniel Levitin, best-selling author, cognitive neuroscientist, and musician
- Andrew Mayne, best-selling author, artificial intelligence researcher, television personality
- Patty Mills, NBA player, San Antonio Spurs, attended St. Mary's College
- Aaron Poreda, Major League Baseball pitcher
- Stephen Robinson, astronaut and professor
- J.R. Rotem, Canadian Israeli-American record producer
- Kim Vandenberg, Olympic silver medalist (swimming)
- Peter Varellas, Olympic silver medalist (water polo)
- Matt Vasgersian, sportscaster for MLB Network; was raised in Moraga
