= Westley, California =

Westley
- Unincorporated Community; Census Designated Place
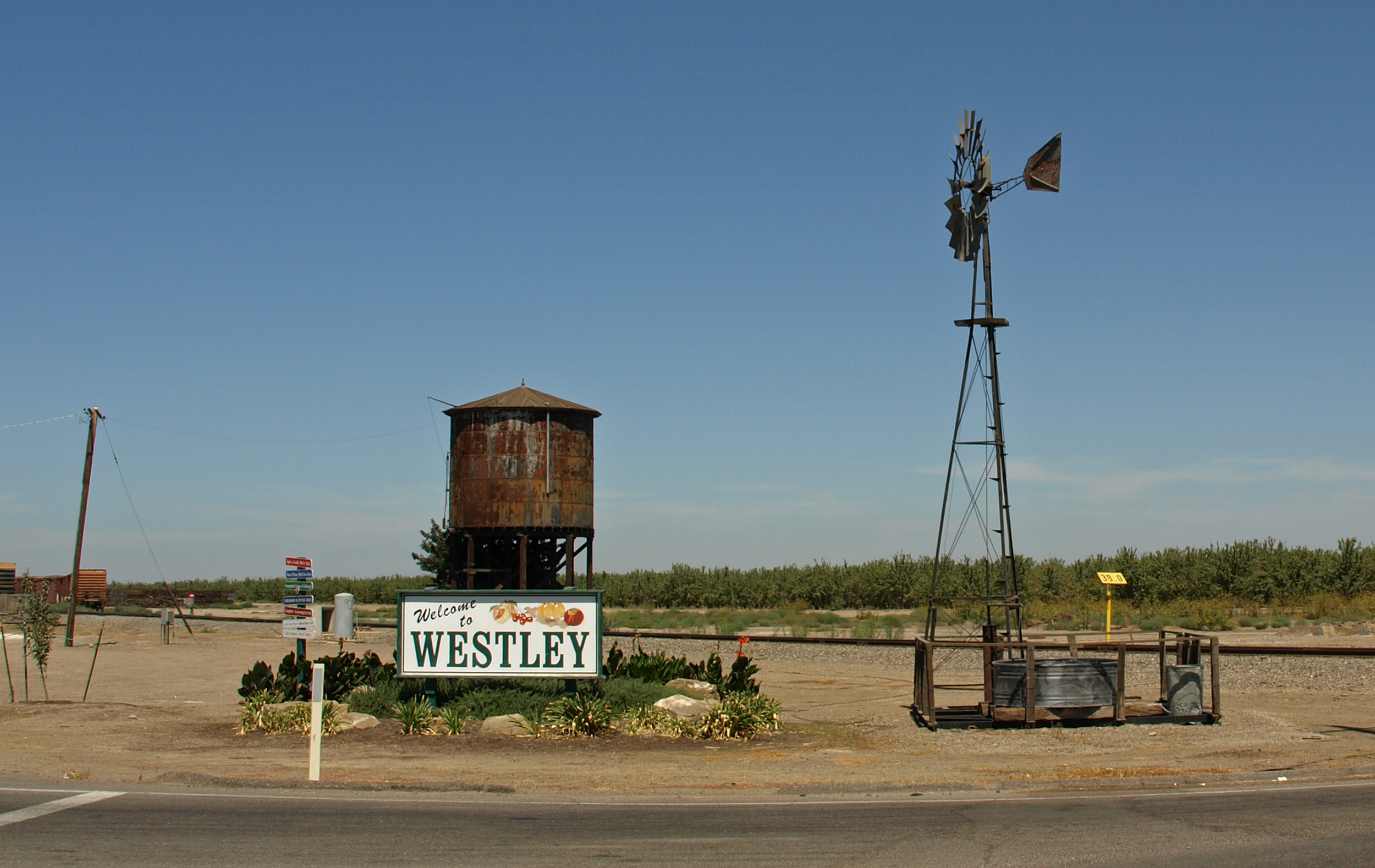
- Historic RR water tank in Westley, CA

- Location in Stanislaus County and the state of California
- Coordinates: 37°32′54″N 121°12′5″W
- Country: United States
- State: California
- County: Stanislaus

Area
  - Total: 0.340 sq mi (0.880 km^{2})
  - Land: 0.340 sq mi (0.880 km^{2})
  - Water: 0 sq mi (0 km^{2}) 0%
- Elevation: 89 ft (27 m)

Population (2020)
  - Total: 575
  - Density: 1,690/sq mi (653/km^{2})
- Time zone: UTC-8 (Pacific (PST))
  - Summer (DST): UTC-7 (PDT)
- ZIP code: 95387
- Area code: 209
- FIPS code: 06-84480
- GNIS feature ID: 0237554

Westley is a census-designated place (CDP) in Stanislaus County, California, United States. The population was 575 at the 2020 census. It is part of the Modesto Metropolitan Statistical Area.

== History ==
=== The Oxford Tire Pile ===
Oxford Energy had a major stake in a large local scrap tire pile operation. When it mostly burnt down in 1997, it was the largest single collection of waste tires on the west coast.

Filbin had begun trucking used tires into Ed's Tire Disposal even before the construction of I-5 between 1956 and 1979. Oxford Energy had been dumping near Westley in various piles since the 1950s.

Oxford Energy officials heard about it causing an eyesore and environmental blight and in 1984 approached both Filbin and the county, proposing the tire-to-energy project. However, it was turned down on environmental grounds.

About 10,000-20,000 tires were being dumped there each day in 1957. It was under a 24-hour security guard.

Some 40 years later the dump had grown to about 6,000,000 tires. In 1997, the state stepped in under a special local legislative mandate to dispose of them.

Shortly after a local photographer, Mr Burtynsky, had photographed Oxford Pile #8, a lightning strike in the facility started a fire that took weeks to extinguish.

== Geography ==
Westley is located at 37°32′54″N 121°12′5″W (37.548255, -121.201264). According to the United States Census Bureau, the CDP has an area of 0.34 square miles (0.88 km^{2}), all land. At the 2010 census, the CDP had a total area of 1.7 square miles (4.4 km^{2}), all land.

Westley lies at the base of the Diablo Range, in the vicinity of Ingram Creek. Somewhat nearby is the San Joaquin Fault. East of the San Joaquin Fault there is a flow pattern of alluvium reported as a mud flow. This flow pattern was deposited in the early Holocene period or the late Pleistocene.

== Demographics ==
Historical population
Census	Pop.	Note	%±
2000	747		—
2010	603		−19.3%
2020	575		−4.6%
U.S. Decennial Census; 1860–1870 1880-1890; 1900 1910 1920; 1930 1940 1950; 1960 1970 1980; 1990 2000 2010

Westley first appeared as a census designated place in the 2000 U.S. census.

=== Historic population ===
- 2010-2014: 853, +14.19% since 2000
- 2010: 603, -19.3% since 2000

=== 2010 ===
At the 2010 census Westley had a population of 603. The population density was 346 inhabitants per square mile (134/km^{2}). The racial makeup of Westley was 212 (35.2%) White, 0 (0.0%) African American, 5 (0.8%) Native American, 1 (0.2%) Asian, 0 (0.0%) Pacific Islander, 368 (61.0%) from other races, and 17 (2.8%) from two or more races. Hispanic or Latino of any race were 579 people (96.0%).

The census reported that 601 people (99.7% of the population) lived in households, 2 (0.3%) lived in non-institutionalized group quarters, and no one was institutionalized.

There were 149 households, 99 (66.4%) had children under the age of 18 living in them, 96 (64.4%) were opposite-sex married couples living together, 25 (16.8%) had a female householder with no husband present, 12 (8.1%) had a male householder with no wife present. There were 8 (5.4%) unmarried opposite-sex partnerships, and 1 (0.7%) same-sex married couples or partnerships. 14 households (9.4%) were one person and 7 (4.7%) had someone living alone who was 65 or older. The average household size was 4.03. There were 133 families (89.3% of households); the average family size was 4.32.

The age distribution was 242 people (40.1%) under the age of 18, 51 people (8.5%) aged 18 to 24, 159 people (26.4%) aged 25 to 44, 111 people (18.4%) aged 45 to 64, and 40 people (6.6%) who were 65 or older. The median age was 25.9 years. For every 100 females, there were 102.3 males. For every 100 females age 18 and over, there were 97.3 males.

There were 157 housing units at an average density of 90.1 per square mile, of the occupied units 32 (21.5%) were owner-occupied and 117 (78.5%) were rented. The homeowner vacancy rate was 0%; the rental vacancy rate was 4.9%. 102 people (16.9% of the population) lived in owner-occupied housing units and 499 people (82.8%) lived in rental housing units.

=== 2000 ===
At the 2000 census there were 747 people, 139 households, and 128 families in the CDP. The population density was 445 inhabitants per square mile (172/km^{2}). There were 151 housing units at an average density of 90.0 per square mile (34.7/km^{2}). The racial makeup of the CDP was 39.36% White, 1.07% African American, 2.41% Native American, 0.54% Asian, 0.27% Pacific Islander, 53.82% from other races, and 2.54% from two or more races. Hispanic or Latino of any race were 83.94%.

Of the 139 households 67.6% had children under the age of 18 living with them, 76.3% were married couples living together, 11.5% had a female householder with no husband present, and 7.2% were non-families. 7.2% of households were one person and 3.6% were one person aged 65 or older. The average household size was 4.38 and the average family size was 4.54.

The age distribution was 36.8% under the age of 18, 12.4% from 18 to 24, 30.1% from 25 to 44, 17.1% from 45 to 64, and 3.5% 65 or older. The median age was 26 years. For every 100 females, there were 126.4 males. For every 100 females age 18 and over, there were 137.2 males.

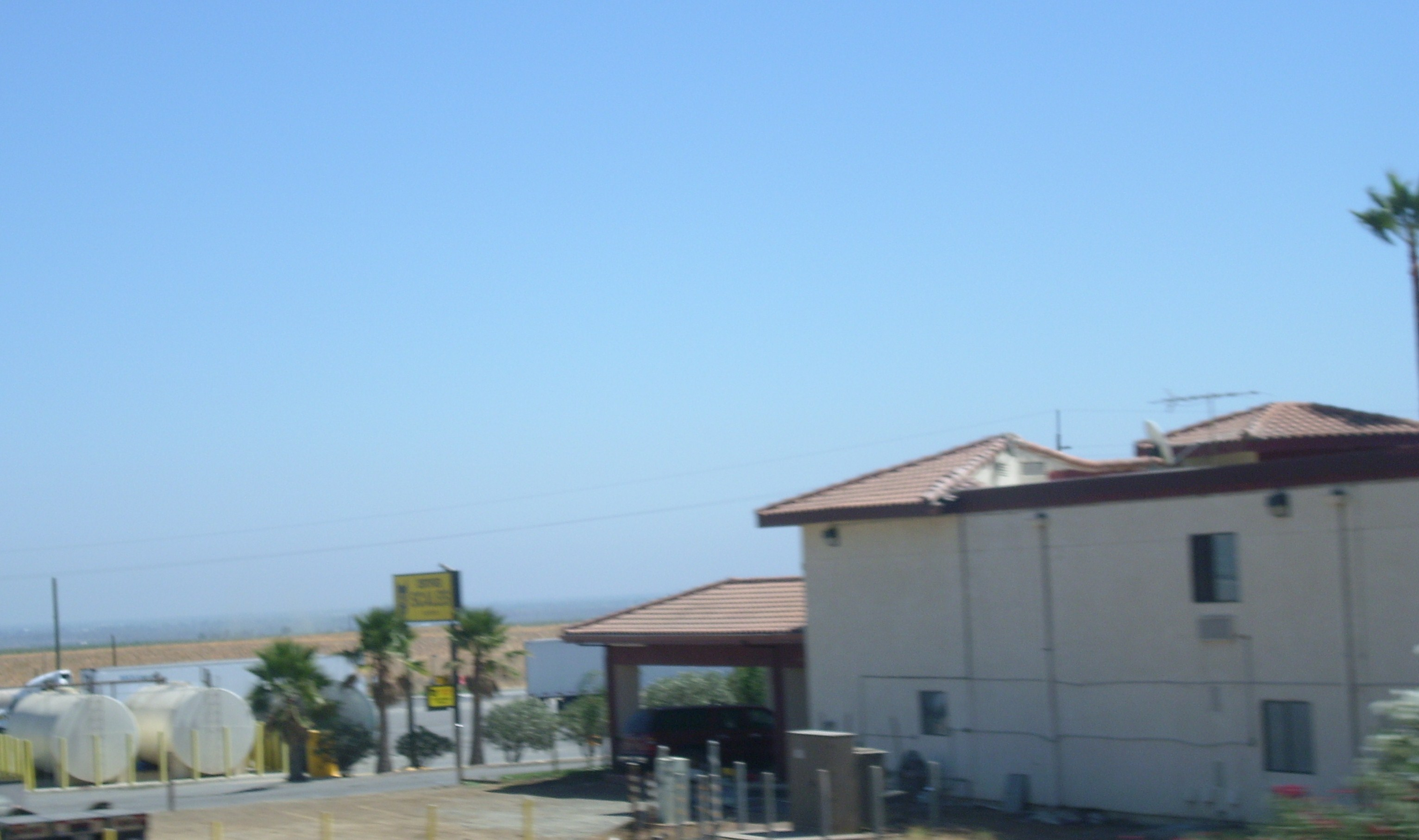
Westley, California

The median household income was $20,417 and the median family income was $21,458. Males had a median income of $16,691 versus $23,750 for females. The per capita income for the CDP was $6,137. About 42.6% of families and 64.9% of the population were below the poverty line, including 68.3% of those under age 18 and 27.8% of those age 65 or over.

== Government ==
In the California State Legislature, Westley is in the 4th senatorial district, represented by Republican Marie Alvarado-Gil, and the 22nd Assembly district, represented by Republican Juan Alanis.

In the United States House of Representatives, Westley is in California's 13th congressional district and is represented by Democrat Adam Gray.

== See also ==
- Kesterson Reservoir
- Hospital Creek
