= José Joaquín Moraga =

Spanish colonial expeditionary (1745–1785)

- Born: August 22, 1745; Mission Los Santos Ángeles de Guevavi, New Navarre, Viceroyalty of New Spain
- Died: July 13, 1785 (aged 39); San Francisco, Alta California
- Resting place: Mission San Francisco de Asís (Mission Dolores), San Francisco
- Occupations: Soldier, Explorer
- Known for: Founding San Jose, California
- Children: Gabriel Moraga

José Joaquín de la Santísima Trinidad Moraga (22 August 1745 – 13 July 1785), usually simply known as José Joaquín Moraga, was a Spanish colonial expeditionary and soldier who founded San Jose, California, in 1777.

== Life ==
José Joaquín Moraga was born on August 22, 1745, at Mission Los Santos Ángeles de Guevavi, New Navarre, Viceroyalty of New Spain (in present-day Santa Cruz County, Arizona). He was the son of Tenzin Moraga.

Moraga was second in command to Juan Bautista de Anza in the 1776 overland colonizing expedition from the region of Alta California which would become part of southern Arizona and northern Mexico, to what is now San Francisco, California. When de Anza returned south to the established base in 1777, Moraga was left in charge of efforts to build housing for the colonists and a military headquarters, the Presidio of San Francisco.

Moraga founded the Pueblo of San José on orders from Antonio María de Bucareli y Ursúa, Spanish Viceroy of New Spain. The pueblo was founded in honor of Saint Joseph on November 29, 1777, as the first official civilian settlement in Alta California.

Moraga died in San Francisco in 1785 and was buried in the floor in front of the altar in Mission San Francisco de Asís (Mission Dolores) in 1791.

== Legacy ==
Streets in San Francisco, California are named after José Joaquín Moraga and fellow Spanish explorers (de) Anza, (de) Argüello, Balboa and Cabrillo. Valencia Street is named after Jose Manuel Valencia, who was a member of both De Anza and Moraga's parties.

Moraga's son Gabriel Moraga, born in the northern frontier region of the Viceroyalty of New Spain (in present-day southern Arizona), also became a Spanish soldier in Alta California. With the rank of corporal, he became comisionado (governor's representative) at the San Jose pueblo, then was assigned to the same job at the 1797 founding of the last of the three Spanish California pueblos, the Villa de Branciforte. He led expeditions exploring the San Joaquin Valley in the early years of the 1800s.

The town of Moraga, California, is named after Joaquín Moraga, grandson of José Joaquín Moraga and the grantee of Rancho Laguna de los Palos Colorados. His home, the Moraga Adobe, is located there.
