= Julie Rubio =

American film director

- Born: August 9, 1969 (age 57); Burbank, California, United States
- Education: Los Angeles Pierce College Lee Strasberg Theater and Film Institute
- Occupations: Film producer, director, screenwriter, actor
- Notable work: East Side Sushi, The True Story of Tamara de Lempicka and The Art of Survival

Julie Colleen Rubio (born August 9, 1969) is an American film director, producer, screenwriter, and actor based in the San Francisco Bay Area. As the founder of East Meets West Productions, Rubio is best known for producing the award-winning independent film East Side Sushi.

== Early life ==
The youngest of seven siblings and half-siblings, Rubio was born in Burbank, CA, and grew up in the Los Angeles area. After studying at Los Angeles Pierce College, she was trained in acting, producing and directing at the Lee Strasberg Theater and Film Institute in both London and New York City. She lived intermittently in California, Hawaii, London and New York. During this period, Rubio acted in commercials and plays (including productions at the Old Ohio Theater), and modeled for magazines.

== Career ==
=== Film ===
==== 2000s–2010s: Early work ====
In 2003, Rubio directed, produced, and starred in an exercise video, Yoga Can Balance Your Life. That same year, she wrote and directed her first short film, "Impression", based on a feature-length screenplay written earlier by Rubio. "Impression" was followed by other short films (“Concerned Lady for America”, “Del Cielo”, and “Soledad is Gone Forever”) in which her involvement ranged from acting to writing, directing, and producing. In 2006, she directed, produced, and wrote her first feature-length film, Six Sex Scenes and a Murder, a murder-mystery noir. After Six Sex Scenes and a Murder, Rubio worked on several short films, including "Oakland B Mine". In 2011, Rubio served as executive producer, director, and writer, as well as portraying “Elijah’s Mom” for her debut feature, Too Perfect, a bittersweet coming-of-age tale following several middle-schoolers as they confront big changes in their lives. On her involvement in Too Perfect, Doniphan Blair of CineSource Magazine described Rubio as a “sharp stylist and outspoken activist, politically and cinematically”.

==== 2014: East Side Sushi ====
Rubio produced her best-known film, East Side Sushi, in 2014. A story about a Mexican immigrant in Oakland, California who dreams of becoming a sushi chef, East Side Sushi touched on many issues that were personally important to Rubio. She said of the production process, “We were able to mix cultures together and have them be respectful of each other…East Side Sushi is such a feminist piece, a very beautiful story about going after your dreams and not giving up. It’s about empowering women. I love that, through this film, we can help little girls grow up with positive role models. I truly believe we can change the world through film.” East Side Sushi was Rubio’s first major critical success, with wins at fourteen film festivals and two more nominations. The film was named one of "the 20 best Bay Area movies of the decade" by the Mercury News.

==== 2017–2023: Further projects ====
Since East Side Sushi, Rubio has produced, written and directed several other short films. She has helped to manage her son Elijah “Kahleo” Stavena’s growing rap career, including producing some of his music videos. Rubio continues to explore themes of cultural sensitivity, gender inequality, and human connection in her upcoming project, a feature-length film called One. One will focus on a Napa Valley wine field worker who follows in her mother’s footsteps to attend Harvard University, where she discovers disturbing revelations about her biological father and works to uncover a solution to sexual assault and gender inequality on campus. The film’s focus on big-picture issues is something that Rubio is committed to maintaining in her filmmaking: "Movies can change people, and I want to be part of that change in a positive way." One is currently in pre-production. In 2022, Rubio became the Vice President of Women In Film SF Bay Area and in 2023 became the President of Women In Film SF Bay Area. Rubio is currently in post-production for her upcoming documentary feature, The True Story of Tamara de Lempicka and the Art of Survival, which explores the life of Polish Art Deco artist Tamara de Lempicka. The trailer for this film screen at the National Museum in Krakow as part of a major exhibition of Tamara de Lempicka's works from museums and private collections in Europe and the USA entitled Łempicka.

2024: The True Story of Tamara de Lempicka & The Art of Survival

The True Story of Tamara de Lempicka and The Art of Survival is a feature documentary about the painter through her artwork. The film covers her rise in 1920s Paris, her move to the United States, and her revival in the current art market. The documentary includes newly found archival evidence regarding Lempicka’s birthdate and the Hurwitz family’s conversion from Judaism to Calvinism.

=== Fashion ===
Rubio owned and operated J. Colleen Boutique in Lafayette, California from August 2013 to August 2016.

J. Colleen Boutique partnered with Wine Women and Film Benefiting Hospice of The East Bay, and Julie Rubio choreographed the fashion show for the charity event, "Wine, Women, and Shoes."

== Personal life ==
Rubio gave birth to her only child in 1996, Elijah “Kahleo” Stavena. Rubio moved to Orinda, CA in the early 2000s, where she continued the career in independent film which she had begun in New York. Rubio married Blake Wellen in 2009.

== Filmography ==
Year	Title	Credited as	Awards and nominations	Notes	Ref
2003	Yoga Can Balance Your Life	Yoga Instructor, director, producer		Made for DVD	
2003	"Impression"	Director, writer		Short film	
2006	“Concerned Lady for America”	Actor		Short film	
2006	“Del Cielo”	Director, producer, writer		Short film	
2006	"Soledad Is Gone Forever"	Producer		Short film	
2008	Six Sex Scenes and a Murder	Producer, writer		Feature film	
2008	Medicine for Melancholy	Special thanks		Feature film	
2010	"Oakland B Mine"	Producer		Short film	
2011	Too Perfect	Director, executive producer, producer, writer, actor (as Elijah's Mom)		Feature film	
2013	"Life's About Your Individuality"	Director, producer		Music video	
2013	"Everything is Temporary"	Director, executive producer	Premiered at Mill Valley Film Festival 2013	Short film	
2014	East Side Sushi	Producer	San Francisco Bay Area International Latino Film Festival Audience Award for Narrative Feature Napa Valley Film Festival Award for Best Screenplay Cinequest Film Festival Audience Favorite Choice Award for Narrative Feature CAAMFest Audience Award for Best Narrative Nominated - CAAMFest Jury Award for Best Narrative San Francisco IndieFest Audience Award for Best Narrative Feature Prescott Film Festival Audience Choice Award for Best Narrative Feature Black Hills Film Festival, US Best Feature Film Beloit International Film Festival BIFFY Award for Best Feature Film Arizona International Film Festival Special Jury Award for Bridging Cultures Cinema Tropical Award for Best U.S. Latino Film	Feature film	
2016	"Crazy Love"	Director, executive producer, producer, writer, actor (as Self)		Short film	
2017	"Dance It Off"	Executive producer, producer		Music video	
2017	"Hawaii"	Executive producer, producer		Music video	
TBD	One	Director, producer, writer		Feature film	
2024	The True Story of Tamara de Lempicka and The Art of Survival	Director, producer, writer		Feature film	
