= Paulsell Valley AVA =

American Viticultural Area in Stanislaus County, California

Coordinates: 37°55′17″N 120°22′38″W

Paulsell Valley
- Wine region
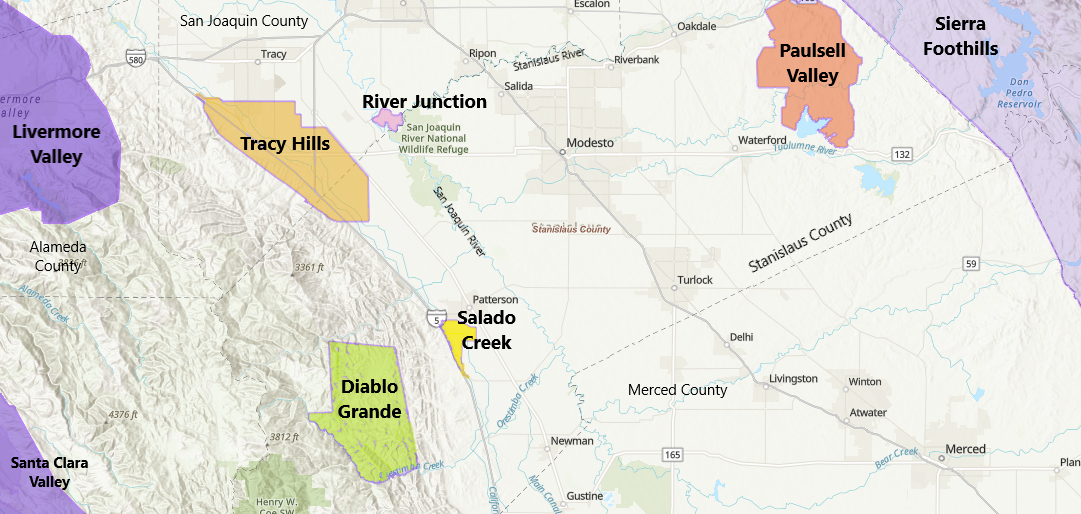
- Stanislaus County AVAs
- Type: American Viticultural Area
- Year established: 2022
- Years of wine industry: 146
- Country: United States
- Part of: California, Stanislaus County
- Other regions in California, Stanislaus County: Diablo Grande AVA, Salado Creek AVA, Tracy Hills AVA
- Climate region: Region V
- Heat units: 4201 to 5204 GDD units
- Precipitation (annual average): 7.6 to 26.4 in (193.0–670.6 mm)
- Soil conditions: Pentz, Peters, Keyes, Raynor, and Paulsell series and the Peters-Pentz complex; primarily formed from volcanic tuff and alluvial fans
- Total area: 34,155 acres (53.367 sq mi)
- Size of planted vineyards: 826 acres (334 ha)
- No. of vineyards: 4
- Grapes produced: Cabernet Sauvignon, Petite Sirah, Petit Verdot, Teroldego

Paulsell Valley is an American Viticultural Area (AVA) located within the Paulsell Valley landform, in Stanislaus County, California. The Paulsell Valley occupies some of the first rises out of the San Joaquin Valley floor, and, as such, is described as part of the foothills of the Sierra Nevada. It was established as the nation's 264^{th}, the state's 145^{th} and county's fourth wine appellation on June 3, 2022 by the Alcohol and Tobacco Tax and Trade Bureau (TTB), Treasury after reviewing the petition submitted by Patrick L. Shabram on behalf of Rock Ridge Ranch proposing the establishment of a viticultural area named "Paulsell Valley."
The viticultural area encompasses approximately 34,155 acres (53 sq mi) and home to three vineyards cultivating about 864 acres (350 ha) with a fourth vineyard of approximately 700 acres (280 ha) currently planned. The Paulsell Valley is not currently within or adjacent to any existing AVA. The closest existing AVA is Sierra Foothills located approximately one mile (1.6 km) to the northeast at its closest location.

== Name Evidence ==
The Paulsell Valley viticultural area is located in a valley carved by Dry Creek in and around the unincorporated community of Paulsell, California. The petition notes that, although the name "Paulsell Valley" is not currently identified by the US Board on Geographic Names or on USGS topographic maps, the name is nonetheless used to describe the region of the AVA. For example, the 1957 Soil Survey of Eastern Stanislaus County, created by the U.S. Department of Agriculture Soil Conservation Service, describes the Paulsell series soil as being found "along Dry Creek in the Paulsell Valley." A 1961 soil association map from the same Federal agency further describes the Paulsell soil series as "deep, clay soils on lacustrine deposits in Paulsell Valley."

== History ==
Viticulture within the Paulsell Valley may have existed as early as the late 19th century. An 1888 directory of grape growers showed ten growers served by the Knights Ferry post office ("Knight's Ferry" in the directory). Knights Ferry is an adjacent community to the north of the Paulsell Valley viticultural area. The location of at least two of those growers, Abraham Schell and H.R. Schell of Red Mountain Vineyard, was about one mile (1.6 km) north of Knights Ferry, hence outside the Paulsell Valley viticultural area. The location of the other growers is not immediately clear, and it is possible that grapes were grown within the northern reaches of the AVA. Additional census and references show viticulture acreage in the Knights Ferry area as early as 1870, as well as in 1891. While the Red Mountain Vineyard and its winery was known to have reestablished after Prohibition, eventually closing in 1943, the hlstories of other vineyards are not immediately known. The Annual Report of the Board of State Viticultural Commissioners in 1881 notes, "The grapes grown compare favorably with those in other localities, the largest vineyards being in and around Knight's Ferry. H.B. Peutland, of Knight's Ferry, report 25 to 30 acres (10–12 ha) in vines, and large quantities of suitable land in that vicinity."

== Terroir ==
=== Topography ===
The landscape of the Paulsell Valley is dominated by rolling hills marked by cut arroyos, but also interspersed with steep, isolated hills. This topography is referred to as "mound-intermound relief." Because of the mound-intermound topography, the petition states that the fluvial valley known as "Paulsell Valley" can be difficult to define in areas, as the isolated hills do not form the typical drainage divides common to many other fluvial valleys. Elevations within the AVA are between 140 and 612 ft (43 and 187 m), with most of the AVA in the 180–400 ft (55–122 m) range. The topography of the Paulsell Valley AVA affects viticulture. According to the petition, the gentle slopes within the AVA ensure good drainage for vineyards. The isolated nature of higher mounds within the AVA decreases shadows on the valley floor, allowing most vineyards to receive long hours of [[solar radiation]]. Furthermore, soils eroding off the higher slopes to the east settle in the lower elevations of the AVA and help ensure that the soils are not leached of nutrients. To the north of the Paulsell Valley AVA is the floodplain of the Stanislaus River, which is described as a "more traditional" valley carved by the Stanislaus River. Along the floodplain are alluvial terraces and fans that differ from the mound-intermound topography of the AVA.
Elevations to the north of the AVA are generally below 300 feet (91 m). To the east of the AVA, the landscape transitions to the Sierra Nevada Mountains, which can rise to several thousand feet. South of the AVA is the Modesto Reservoir. To the southwest and southeast of the AVA, mound-intermound relief similar to that of the AVA is also present, but it becomes less pronounced because the upper depositional layers have been weathered and eroded away. Although the hills in these regions are lower than those within the AVA, the petition states that they occur in greater frequency. West of the AVA, the terrain transitions to the San Joaquin Valley floor, which has significantly flatter topography and elevations that are typically below 200 feet (61 m).

=== Climate ===
The petition also describes the climate of the Paulsell Valley AVA. From 2012 to 2017, annual growing degree day (GDD) 1 accumulations within the proposed AVA ranged from 4,201 to 5,204. Average growing season low temperatures during the same time period were between 55.4 and 57.9 °F (13.0 and 14.4 °C). Annual precipitation amounts during the same time period ranged from 7.6 to 26.4 in (190–670 mm). The petition states that the temperatures within the AVA impact the timing of bud break, grape development and sugar accumulations, and harvest dates. The annual precipitation amounts provide adequate soil moisture and reduce the need for irrigation. West of the Paulsell Valley AVA, in the San Joaquin Valley, GDD accumulations were lower during the 2012–2017 period and ranged from 3,780 to 4,308. Precipitation amounts during the same period were also generally lower in the San Joaquin Valley than in the proposed AVA, as was the average growing season low temperature. In the region to the southwest of the AVA, GDD accumulations were also generally lower than within the AVA, ranging from 3,949 to 4,437.
Precipitation amounts in this region were also lower than within the AVA, ranging from 6.6 to 19.6 inches (170–500 mm). East of the AVA, GDD accumulations were similar to slightly lower than those within the AVA, ranging from 4,586 to 4,711. Precipitation amounts were higher in the region to the east, ranging from 30.5 to 37.6 inches (770–960 mm). Climate data was not available for the regions due north and south of the AVA. The USDA plant hardiness zone is 9b.

=== Soil ===
Layers of volcanic tuff, which is rock created from the deposition of volcanic ash instead of from direct lava flow, form the parent material for the most common soil types in the Paulsell Valley AVA. The most common soils are the Pentz series soils, which comprise 23 percent of the soil within the AVA. Soils in this series include Pentz cobbly loam and Pentz sandy loam. Soils from the Peters series account for 11 percent of the soils within the AVA, while the Peters–Pentz complex make up a little more than 22 percent of the soils. The petition describes a "complex" as similar soil types mixed at such a scale that they are not defined as one type or the other. Soils within the AVA are well-drained, which helps prevent soil-borne pathogens that can harm vines. The petition states that the soils have a different mineral content and holding capacity than the soils of surrounding regions. Holding capacity impacts how much moisture from rainfall can be utilized by grape vines. The mineral content of a soil is often credited with creating subtle distinctions in the flavors of grapes. The petition notes that Peters and Pentz soils are found in the regions to the west and southeast of the Paulsell Valley AVA. However, the petition states that sharp contrasts in soils exist to the north, northeast, and south of the AVA. To the north of the AVA, along the floodplain of the Stanislaus River, alluvial sandy soils are abundant, including soils of the Honcut, Hanford, and Columbia series. To the northeast of the AVA, the Amador and Auburn soils are more common. These soils derive from tuffaceous sediments, similar to the Pentz and Peters soils, although the Auburn soil has metamorphic parent material. Other soils in the region to the northeast of the AVA include soils derived from metamorphosed igneous rocks, such as the Exchequer soils, and soils derived from sedimentary rock, such as the Hornitos soils. South of the AVA, Hopeton clays, Montpellier coarse sandy loam, and Whitney sandy loams are more common. These soils are formed from deposited sediments usually of granitic origin, or weakly consolidated sandstone of igneous material, and lack volcanic tuff material.

== Viticulture ==
The first modern vineyard was planted by Bill Jackson in the early 2000s. The Jackson vineyard was planted south of Dry Creek. Almost directly north of Dry Creek, Rock Ridge Ranch first planted vines in 2010, while Rock Creek Vineyards was planted in 2013. No wineries exist within the area, but French Bar wlnes was created with the 2015 vintage to produce wines specific to the region, sourcing fruit mostly from Rock Ridge Ranch.
