= Tracy Hills AVA =

American Viticultural Area in Stanislaus County and San Joaquin County, California

Coordinates: 37°42′04″N 121°24′39″W

Tracy Hills
- Wine region
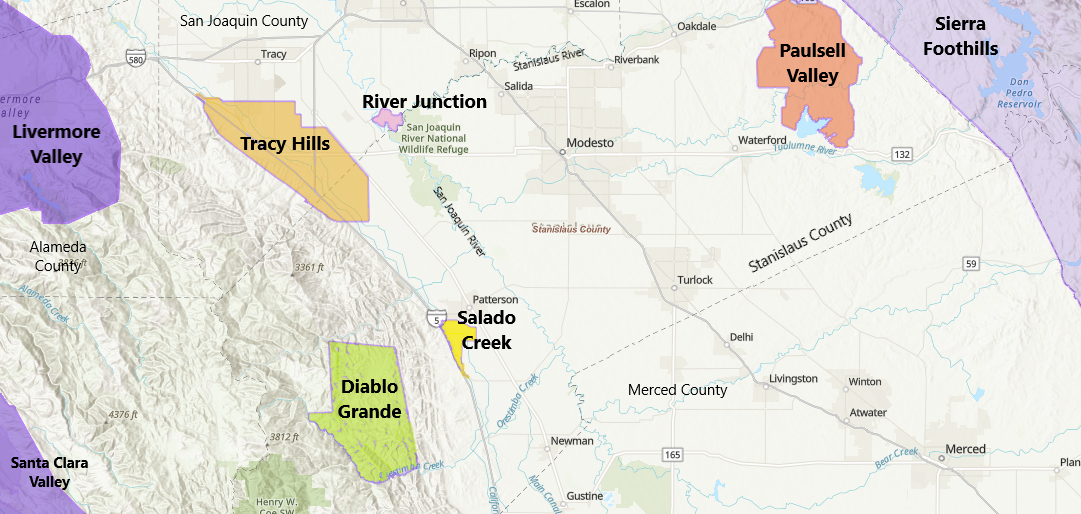
- Stanislaus County AVAs
- Type: American Viticultural Area
- Year established: 2006
- Country: United States
- Part of: California, San Joaquin County, Stanislaus County
- Growing season: 255 days
- Climate region: Region V
- Heat units: 4,033 GDD
- Precipitation (annual average): 8–9 inches (200–230 mm)
- Soil conditions: Uplifted, dissected terraces on bedrock, alluvial fans, low stream terraces
- Total area: 39,200 acres (61.3 sq mi)
- No. of vineyards: 5
- Grapes produced: Cabernet Sauvignon, Chardonnay, Montepulciano, Nero d'Avola, Sagrantino, Syrah
- No. of wineries: 4

Tracy Hills is an American Viticultural Area (AVA) is located primarily in southern San Joaquin and straddling northwestern Stanislaus Counties, California approximately 55 miles (89 km) east-southeast from San Francisco on the western edge of the Central Valley south and southwest of the city of Tracy, California. The wine appellation was established as the nation's 183^{rd}, the state's 106^{th} and San Joaquin County's seventh AVA on November 8, 2006 by the Alcohol and Tobacco Tax and Trade Bureau (TTB), Treasury after reviewing the petition submitted by Sara Schorske of Compliance Service of America, Inc., on behalf of the Brown family, owners of a vineyard near Tracy, proposing the viticultural area named "Tracy Hills."
The name "Tracy," is used to identify the neighboring city of Tracy, California, and its surrounding agricultural land, together with the geographical modifier "Hills," to accurately describe the viticultural area. The 32,900-acre (51.4 sq mi) region was designated based on the petition by the Brown family, owners of Tulip Hill Winery in Lake County and their Mount Oso vineyard in the Tracy Hills appellation. The five original vineyards in the appellation are planted between 100 and 500 feet (30–152 m) above sea level among the low, rolling Altamont Hills surrounding Tracy. The best known vintages are a range of Italian varietals, Nero d'Avola, Montepulciano and Sagrantino, produced by Jacuzzi Family Vineyards who are based in Sonoma Valley. The sloping hillside topography includes streams and alluvial fans and plains. The distinguishing climatic features of the proposed area include limited rainfall and persistent winds, along with sparse fog, frost, and dew.

Originally, the petitioner submitted the name "Mt. Oso" for the proposed viticultural area. However, after an initial review of the petition, TTB concluded and advised the petitioner that the submitted evidence did not demonstrate, as required by § 9.3(b)(1) of the TTB regulations, that the proposed viticultural area is locally or nationally known as "Mt. Oso." In response, the petitioner amended the petition to propose use of the name "Tracy Hills" for the proposed viticultural area. The petitioner also revised the proposed viticultural area's western boundary and submitted additional evidence to support the amended petition.

== Terroir ==
=== Topography ===
The western portion of the Tracy Hills viticultural area lies in the eastern foothills of the Diablo Range, while the remainder of the area slopes to the east towards the lower elevations of the San Joaquin River valley, according to the provided USGS maps. This transitional terrain, between 500 and 100 feet (152 and 30 m) in elevation, creates a 400-foot (120 m) drop within a 3 to 3.7 miles (4.8 to 6.0 km) west-to-east span, giving the area a 2 percent to 2.5 percent slope, as noted in the petition. Three intermittent streams, Corral Hollow, Lonetree and Hospital Creeks, flow east through the Tracy Hills viticultural area, to the San Joaquin Valley flood plain, the petitioner explains. Flowing down from the higher Diablo Range elevations, these streams created the alluvial fans and deposits found within the Tracy Hills viticultural area.

=== Climate ===
The unique climate of the Tracy Hills viticultural area is its most distinctive characteristic. The sheltering effect of Mt. Oso and the Diablo Range, the marine winds coming through the Altamont Pass, and the cold air drainage from the higher mountain elevations, create a microclimate in the Tracy Hills area with the lowest annual rainfall in the Tracy region. These climatic elements combine to produce a microclimate with less rain, fog, dew, and frost than the surrounding areas. The USDA plant hardiness zone is 9b.

==== Rainfall ====
Tracy Hills viticultural area is located on the west side of the San Joaquin Valley area and, therefore, is in the rain shadow of Mt. Oso in the Diablo Range. This rain shadow creates an environment with less precipitation than the surrounding areas. Based on its proximity to the 3,347-foot (1,020 m) sheltering Mt. Oso peak, the Tracy Hills viticultural area has 8 to 9 in (200 to 230 mm) of annual rain which is the lowest in the region.
According to the provided San Joaquin County Soil Survey map, the average annual precipitation, in inches, in the surrounding regions of San Joaquin County is at least 10 in (250 mm). Also, at the higher mountain elevations, about 9 miles (14 km) west of the boundary line, the rainfall map shows about 18 inches (460 mm), or twice the rainfall of the Tracy Hills viticultural area. To the north, along the San Joaquin Valley floor, the precipitation increases correspond to the longer distances from the rain shadow, with Stockton at about 13 inches (330 mm) of rain and Lodi at 16 inches (410 mm) of rain annually, according to the provided rainfall map.

==== Temperature ====
The temperatures found in the Tracy Hills viticultural area vary from the surrounding areas. A statistical table, compiled by Stan Grant of Progressive Viticulture, shows the average annual heat accumulation at various weather stations in the greater Tracy region during the 1990s as measured in degree days. Each degree that a day's mean temperature is above 50 degrees F, which is the minimum temperature required for grapevine growth, is counted as one degree day. These 10-year averages reflect lower and upper threshold temperatures of 50 to 115 degrees F, respectively. Brentwood is closer to the cooling maritime influences of San Francisco Bay and the Carquinez Strait, according to the petitioner, while Manteca is directly in the path of the cooling marine winds blowing through the Altamont Pass. The Tracy Hills viticultural area is located a short distance south of Altamont Pass, while Modesto is about 25 miles (40 km) south of the pass. Newman the warmest region, is 40 miles (64 km) south of the pass and its cooling marine winds.

==== Wind ====
The degree day measurement of heat accumulation referred to above does not indicate seasonal vine growth and development as accurately when fog, clouds, and a prevailing wind affect the viticultural area. The significance of wind is noted in a 1943 USDA Soil Survey of the Tracy area: Aside from the soil and moisture conditions, which have the most important bearing on crops that can be grown in this area, another factor that has a definite influence is wind. The wind during certain seasons is very strong, blowing from the northwest along the western side of the San Joaquin Valley. The constant wind of the Altamont Pass has a cooling effect on vineyards within the Tracy Hills viticultural area through evaporation of moisture on grapevine leaves. The earth-warmed marine air and winds of the Livermore Valley blow west-to-east through the Pass, into the San Joaquin Valley, and then south, passing directly over the viticultural area. Also, the down-slope winds from the Diablo Range have a cooling climatic influence on the area's agriculture.

==== Frost and Fog ====
The petitioner states that residents and workers in the Tracy Hills viticultural area have observed certain distinctive climatic characteristics within the area. Frost is "unknown," the petitioner explains, although it occurs beyond the viticultural area boundary. Ground fog forms to the south of the Tracy Hills viticultural area and gradually extends north. If the fog does invade the area at all, the petitioner notes that it is usually short-lived.

=== Soils ===
The soils in the Tracy Hills viticultural area are recent alluvial deposits from the intermittent streams flowing down from the upper elevations of the Diablo Range to the San Joaquin Valley floor. The geologic fans and fan terraces found along the Corral Hollow, Hospital and Lonetree Creeks meld into one vast alluvial plain, according to the San Joaquin County Soil Survey. The soils found on this alluvial plain are very deep, well-drained to moderately well-drained, and have water tables deeper than six feet (1.8 m). Silty and clay soils are found at the lower elevations of this alluvial plain, while at its higher elevations, soils are generally gravelly and the alluvial deposits are eroded with deep drainage cuts. Beyond the boundary of the Tracy Hills viticultural area, the soils and their origins differ, according to the petitioner. To the north are the low-elevation organic peat soils of the Sacramento-San Joaquin Delta region. To the east, and generally below the 100-foot (30 m) elevation, are heavy clay soils with higher water tables created by irrigation and proximity to the San Joaquin River. To the south, the soils and terrain are similar to the Tracy Hills viticultural area, with the boundary line primarily defining the border between the alluvial fans of Hospital Creek, which is within the viticultural area, and Ingram Creek, which is further to the south. To the west, and above the 500-foot (150 m) elevation in the upper foothills of the Diablo Range, the soils are primarily gravelly, older alluvial deposits. Also to the west, the soils are rolling to very steep and situated on terrain of uplifted, dissected terraces and mountains, developed on bedrock.
