= Rancho Laguna de los Palos Colorados =

Mexican land grant in California

Coordinates: 37.930°N 122.170°W

Rancho Laguna de Los Palos Colorados was a 13,316-acre (53.89 km^{2}) Mexican land grant in the Berkeley Hills (then called the Sierra de la Contra Costa, "Contra Costa Range") within present-day Contra Costa County, California.

It was given in 1841 by Governor Juan Alvarado to Joaquín Moraga and his cousin, Juan Bernal. The name means "Ranch of the Lake of the Redwoods" in Spanish.

The rancho included the present-day Orinda, Lafayette and Moraga, as well as the communities of Canyon and Rheem.

== History ==
In 1835, Joaquín Moraga (1792–1855) and his cousin, Juan Bernal (1802–1847), successfully petitioned and were granted their request for Rancho Laguna de Los Palos Colorados. Joaquín Moraga was the grandson of José Joaquín Moraga, who was a Spanish soldier on the Anza Expedition. Juan Bernal was the grandson of Juan Francisco Bernal, also a Spanish soldier on the Anza Expedition.

With the cession of California to the United States following the Mexican-American War, the 1848 Treaty of Guadalupe Hidalgo provided that the land grants would be honored. As required by the Land Act of 1851, a claim for Rancho Laguna de los Palos Colorados was filed with the Public Land Commission in 1853, and the grant was patented to Joaquín Moraga in 1878.

Juan Bernal died in 1847, and Joaquín Moraga died in 1855. By 1859, through a series of complex and often questionable transactions, most of the Rancho Laguna de los Palos Colorados had been acquired by lawyer Horace Carpentier. Carpentier sold the land in 1889 to two railroad men, Angus A. Grant (1843–1901) and James A. Williamson (1829–1902). They formed the Moraga Land Association and planned to build a railroad and to subdivide the property into town sites and small ranches, but the plan never materialized and Carpentier foreclosed on the property.

In 1912, Charles A. Hooper (1843–1914) and James Irvine II were interested in purchasing the property. The Oakland & Antioch Railroad, which had been granted a right of way through the Rancho, had been completed in 1913. Hooper purchased the property and just a week later he made the first of a number of sales to his rival, Irvine. By 1923, Irvine's Moraga Company had acquired most of the rancho.

Irvine died in 1947 and in 1953 his heirs sold his remaining 5,000 acres (20 km^{2}) of the original rancho to the Utah Construction Company. The company was met with organized opposition from the community. During the thirteen years that Utah Construction owned the land, they never built a single home although this was the period of the great growth in the valley. They did, however, develop the subdivisions that were sold to numerous building contractors. Among those building contractors emerged the Rheem brothers, Donald and Richard, who in 1961 formed the Rheem Land Company.

== Historic sites of the Rancho ==
- Moraga Adobe — the Joaquin Moraga Adobe is estimated to have been constructed about 1841. Listed on the National Register of Historic Places. In 1941 this property was acquired and restored by Katharine Brown White Irvine of Oakland.

== See also ==
- Ranchos of Contra Costa County, California
