= Orinda Union School District =

School district in California

Address
- 8 Altarinda Road Orinda, California, 94563; United States

District information
- Type: Public
- Grades: K–8
- NCES District ID: 0628860

Students and staff
- Students: 2,478
- Teachers: 122.62 (FTE)
- Staff: 89.32 (FTE)
- Student–teacher ratio: 20.21:1

Other information
- Website: www.orindaschools.org

Orinda Union School District (OUSD) is a school district in Orinda, California, United States, that serves students in Transitional Kindergarten (TK) through 8th grade. It consists of four elementary schools and one middle school. It is the highest ranked TK–8 school district in California, ranked by API score. Orinda Union School District’s Del Rey Elementary, Glorietta Elementary, and Wagner Ranch Elementary were also selected as California Distinguished Schools for 2018. On completion of middle school, students generally enroll in nearby Acalanes Union High School District, usually to either Miramonte High School (Orinda) or Campolindo High School (Moraga).

The Superintendent is Dr. Aida Glimme.

Carol Brown was President of the School Board. Hillary Weiner was the Vice President. As of 2020, Cara Hoxie is President of the School Board. Liz Daoust is the Vice President.

The district includes the majority of Orinda and small portions of Lafayette and Moraga.

== Schools ==
- Del Rey Elementary (Principal: Maple Lai), TK–5
- Glorietta Elementary School (Principal: Tracey Lewis), TK–5
- Sleepy Hollow Elementary (Principal: Patsy Templeton), TK–5
- Wagner Ranch Elementary (Principal: Jim Manheimer), TK–5
- Orinda Intermediate School (OIS) (Principal: Andrea Powers), 6–8
