= Ingram Canyon =

Valley in Stanislaus County, California, United States

Ingram Canyon is a valley or canyon where the upper reach of Ingram Creek runs in Stanislaus County, California.

The mouth of Ingram Canyon is located at an elevation of 259 feet (79 meters). The head of Ingram Canyon is located at 37°31′27″N 121°20′31″W at an elevation of 880 feet (270 meters) in the Diablo Range. The upper reach of Ingram Creek runs through Ingram Canyon.

The mouth of Ingram Creek is located at 37°36′52″N 121°12′24″W at an elevation of 46 feet (14 meters) where it has its confluence with a slough of the San Joaquin River. The source of Ingram Creek is located at the confluence of Grummett Creek and Cedar Spring Gulch at 37°31′27″N 121°20′31″W at an elevation of 880 feet (270 meters).
