= Mount Oso =

Mountain in California, United States

- Mount Oso in the distance.

Highest point
- Elevation: 3,352 ft (1,022 m) NAVD 88
- Prominence: 960 ft (290 m)
- Coordinates: 37°30′30″N 121°22′30″W

Geography
- Location: Stanislaus County, California, U.S.
- Parent range: Diablo Range
- Topo map: USGS Solyo

Climbing
- Easiest route: None (gated private property)

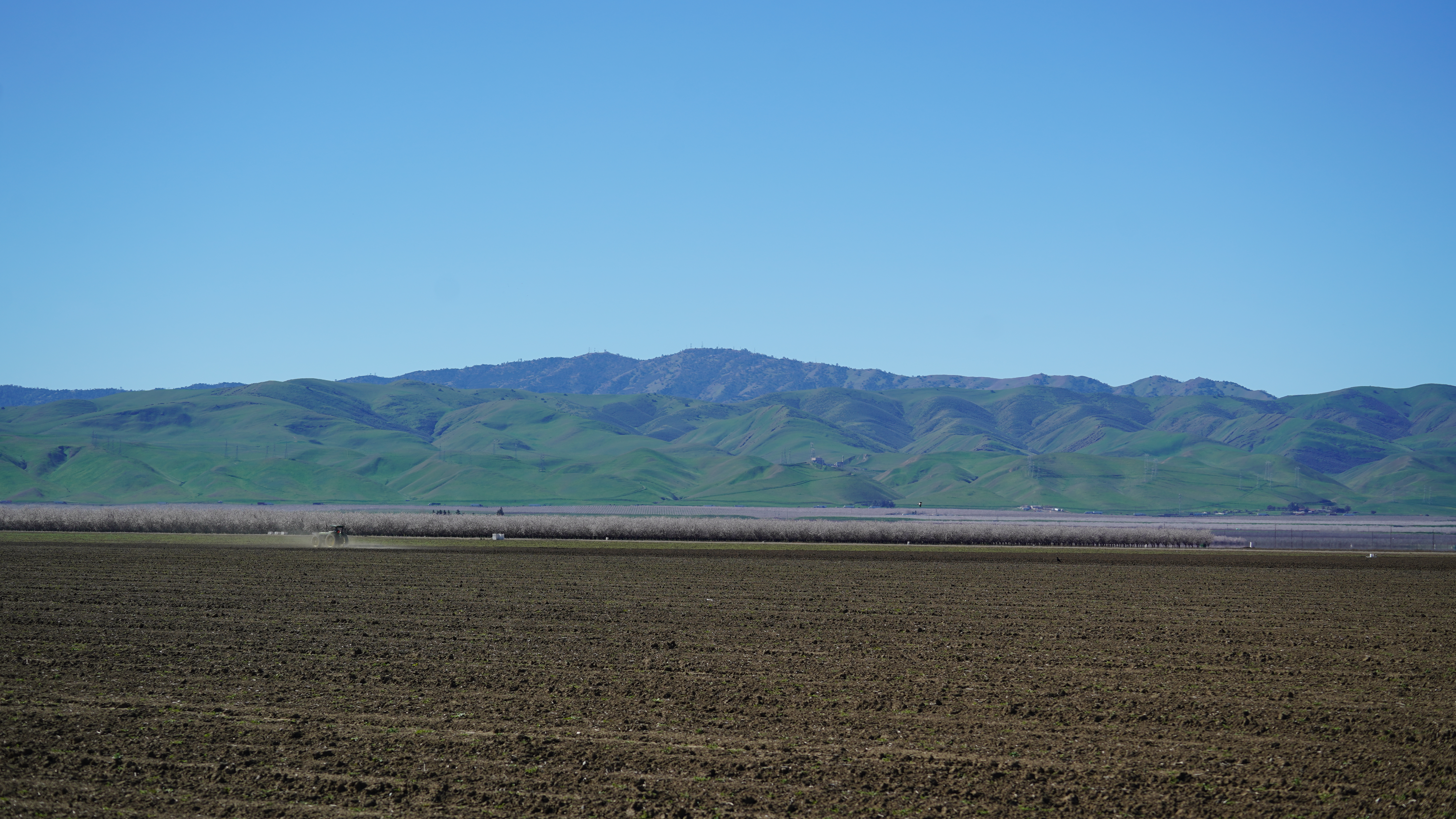
Mount Oso from California State Route 33 near Vernalis, California.

Mount Oso (Spanish: Cerro del Oso) is a mountain in Western Stanislaus County, California, and is located on the Diablo Range. At 3,352 feet (1,022 m) feet in elevation, it is the third highest point in Stanislaus County. There are many radio stations and an unused forest fire lookout tower on the mountain. It appears in the City of Modesto's logo due to its predominance in the area's skyline.

== History ==
Mount Oso, (oso - Spanish for bear), was probably discovered by Gabriel Moraga during his expeditions in the Central Valley. This mountain can clearly be seen in Modesto, California, and has a beautiful contrast with the almond orchards. There is no exact date of the first ascent of the mountain.

== Location ==
The mountain is in Western Stanislaus County, 10 miles west of Westley, California, and is not accessible to the public due to surrounding gated private property.
