= San Joaquin Fault =

The San Joaquin Fault is a seismically active geological structure in the California Central Valley. East of the San Joaquin fault there is a flow pattern of alluvium that has been reported to be a mud flow. This flow pattern was deposited in the early Holocene or the late Pleistocene age.

== See also ==
- Hospital Creek, a tributary of the San Joaquin River draining the eastern slopes of part of the Diablo Range.
- Ingram Creek, a tributary of the San Joaquin River.
