= Holden High School (California) =

Location
- 10 Irwin Way; Orinda, California 94563; United States
- Coordinates: 37.885595°N 122.189051°W

Information
- Type: Private
- Faculty: 15
- Enrollment: 40
- Website: http://www.holdenhigh.org

Holden High School is a private, non-profit school located in Orinda, Contra Costa County, California, United States.

Founded in 1969, it is accredited by the Western Association of Schools and Colleges and its diplomas are recognized by the State of California.

The students are from all over the San Francisco Bay Area, and reflect the area's diversity.
