= The True Story of Tamara de Lempicka and The Art of Survival =

Tamara de Lempicka documentary

The True Story of Tamara de Lempicka & The Art of Survival
- Directed by: Julie Rubio
- Written by: Julie Rubio
- Produced by: Julie Rubio
- Production company: East Meets West Productions
- Release date: October 11, 2024
- Running time: 96 minutes
- Country: United States
- Language: English

The True Story of Tamara de Lempicka & The Art of Survival is a documentary film directed, written, and produced by Julie Rubio. The film explores the life and artistic legacy of Polish Art Deco painter Tamara de Lempicka, utilizing previously unseen 8 mm home movies, paintings, and newly discovered birth and baptism certificates. It reveals her true name, heritage, and identity for the first time.

== Synopsis ==
The documentary examines Lempicka’s personal life, including her relationships with male and female models, her bisexuality, and her Jewish heritage. It features interviews with art historians, family members including her granddaughter and great-granddaughters, Broadway performer Eden Espinosa, collectors, and narration by Anjelica Huston. These elements are combined with archival materials to highlight themes of artistic survival, resilience, identity, and creative expression.

== Production ==
The film was produced by East Meets West Productions. It uses a visual narrative that interweaves archival footage with Lempicka’s paintings, animated motion graphics, and interviews to explore her resilience as a bisexual Jewish artist navigating early 20th-century Europe and America.

== Release ==
The True Story of Tamara de Lempicka & The Art of Survival had its world premiere on 11 October 2024 at the Mill Valley Film Festival, screening at the Sequoia Theatre and closing the festival at the Lark Theater.

It headlined the 2024–2025 Tamara de Lempicka retrospective at the Fine Arts Museums of San Francisco, and screened at venues including Lincoln Center (New York), the San Diego Jewish Film Festival, the Museum of Fine Arts in Houston and Boston, Coral Gables Art Cinema, River Oaks Theater, Balboa Theater, and the Lark Theater.

Diplomatic and international screenings included the Polish Embassy in Washington, D.C.; Consulate General of Poland in Montreal; Kraków Film Festival; VIFF Centre in Vancouver; and the Polish Institute in Budapest. Future screenings are scheduled at Laemmle’s Royal Theater in Los Angeles with expanded distribution through the Culture Vulture Series and A Shaded View on Fashion and Film Festival in Paris.

== See also ==
- Tamara de Lempicka
- Art Deco
- Women in art
