= Anthony Lucero =

American film director

- Born: Oakland, California, United States
- Education: B.A. in film, San Francisco State University
- Occupations: Director, cinematographer, producer, screenwriter, film editor
- Known for: East Side Sushi

Anthony Lucero is an American film director and visual effects editor. He is best known for the independent feature film East Side Sushi.

== Life and career ==
Lucero was born in Oakland, California, United States. He received his B.A. in film from San Francisco State University. After receiving his B.A. in film, Lucero worked as an editor and director of photography in both commercials and documentaries. He spent over a decade working in visual effects at Industrial Light & Magic, working on such films as Star Wars: Episodes I & II, Pirates of the Caribbean, Ironman, and Harry Potter and the Prisoner of Azkaban, and as a documentary filmmaker at Lucasfilm on Star Wars: The Force Awakens. His first feature film was East Side Sushi, a film that tackles both race and gender roles with the story of Juana, a Mexican immigrant who strives to become a sushi chef. Lucero wrote, directed, and produced the film, and also edited it. East Side Sushi won 10 awards during its festival run. In 2015, HBO picked up East Side Sushi and started offering it on its cable channel and streaming in September 2016.

In 2017, Lucero was nominated for 5 Diosa De Plata awards for Best Director, Best First, Best First Film, Best Screenplay and Best Editing. Also in 2017, Lucero served as a U.S. Envoy to Japan to screen East Side Sushi. Lucero was selected to be a director in the 2016–2018 Disney/ABC Directing Program and is now working in television.

== Filmography ==
Year	Title	Role	Notes
2014	East Side Sushi		Director, writer, producer, editor
