= Lone Tree Creek, San Joaquin County =

Lone Tree Creek formerly Dry Creek

Location
- Country: United States
- State: California
- Region: San Joaquin County, Stanislaus County

Physical characteristics
- Source
  - location: 3.4 miles north northwest of Oakdale, about 550 ft. west southwest of the end of Parson Ranch Road., Stanislaus County
  - coordinates: 37°48′31″N 120°52′48″W
  - elevation: 165 ft (50 m)
- Mouth: French Camp Slough
  - location: at the confluence with Little John Creek, San Joaquin County
  - coordinates: 37°52′36″N 121°14′12″W
  - elevation: 22 ft (6.7 m)

Lone Tree Creek, formerly Dry Creek, a stream and tributary to the San Joaquin River, flowing in San Joaquin County and Stanislaus County, central California.

It is named for the settlement of Lone Tree, about 2 1/4 miles northeast of present-day Escalon.

Its headwaters, in the Sierra Nevada foothills, are now 3.4 miles northwest of Oakdale, about 550 ft. southwest of the end of Parson Ranch Road, in Stanislaus County. Originally its source in the foothills was a few miles to the east, but its upper reaches were subsequently diverted for irrigation.

The creek flows westward into San Joaquin County where it joins with Little John Creek. Their confluence forms French Camp Slough, a primary tributary of the San Joaquin River.

== History ==
The settlement of Lone Tree was once the location of a crossing on Dry Creek, for the Stockton - Los Angeles Road on its route from Stockton to the ferries on the Stanislaus River in the vicinity of Oakdale.
