= East Side Sushi =

American film

- Theatrical release poster
- Directed by: Anthony Lucero
- Written by: Anthony Lucero
- Produced by: Anthony Lucero; Julie Rubio
- Starring: Diana Elizabeth Torres; Yutaka Takeuchi; Rodrigo Duarte Clark
- Cinematography: Martin Rosenberg
- Edited by: Anthony Lucero
- Music by: Alex Mandel
- Distributed by: Samuel Goldwyn Films (USA) (all media); Eagle Films (Non-US/Middle east) (all media); Sony Pictures Home Entertainment (USA) (DVD)
- Release dates: March 8, 2014 (Cinequest Film Festival); September 18, 2015
- Running time: 106 minutes
- Country: United States
- Languages: English; Spanish; Japanese

East Side Sushi is a 2014 film starring Diana Elizabeth Torres and directed by Anthony Lucero.

== Plot ==
Juana is a single Mexican-American mother who lives with her young daughter and widowed father in East Oakland, California. She tries a string of jobs ranging from tending her father's fruit cart to working at Mexican taquerias, and she can slice and dice with speed and precision.

After getting robbed while tending the fruit cart, she applies for and is hired as a sous chef at the Japanese restaurant Osaka. She starts off as a kitchen helper, but as her interest in sushi grows, she starts to develop signature sushi dishes on her own time through much trial and error. She also eyes entering a contest called "Champions of Sushi," which offers a first prize of $20,000. When a sushi chef quits, Juana is asked to help make sushi dishes. She improves and impresses the veteran chef Aki, to whom she starts to get close. But the Japanese owner, Mr. Yoshida, refuses to let her work as a sushi chef to "keep the authenticity of the restaurant." Juana, though keeping her head down at first, demands a chance to become a sushi chef, but Mr. Yoshida turns her down because she is a woman and not Japanese.

She angrily quits and starts working at a car wash, but is selected as one of four finalists in the "Champions of Sushi" contest, which is televised. She tells Aki the good news and they go on a date, eating mostly Mexican food from food trucks. With the staff at her former restaurant watching her on TV, she puts up a good fight in the contest, but ultimately places second. She cries backstage after her defeat. However, she has gained the respect of her fellow competitors that previously mocked her, and Mr. Yoshida.

The film ends with a scene of her father and daughter eating at Osaka Restaurant with Aki, and Juana working as a sushi chef. She and Mr. Yoshida drink a toast.

== Cast ==
- Diana Elizabeth Torres as Juana Martinez
- Yutaka Takeuchi as Aki
- Rodrigo Duarte Clark as Apa
- Kaya Jade Aguirre as Lydia
- Roji Oyama as Mr. Yoshida
- Miyoko Sakatani as Mrs. Yoshida
- James J. Der Jr. as Kyung
- Jesus Fuentes as Victor
- Tony Quintero as Jorge
- Lane Nishikawa as Jimmy Nishida
- David Blount-Porter as Studio Director
- Anastasia Pritchard as Brenda
- Melissa Locsin as Studio Coordinator

== Production ==
Director Anthony Lucero was primarily known for his documentaries and special effects work when he began writing a screenplay about a restaurant dishwasher, Juan, who yearned to be a French chef. In time, the central cuisine became Japanese, and after eight months of research, Lucero realized he had never seen a woman sushi chef. He tossed his 30 page script, Juan became Juana, and sexism, along with national origin, became thematic layers of the story. "What is authentic food?" Lucero asked rhetorically in an interview. "Is it where you’re from? Is it your sex? To make Thai food, do you need to be from Thailand, or is that something that’s learned?...Can you put your own spin on it. Can somebody from Poland make good Mexican food? Is it learned, or is it in their blood? I like people thinking about that."

Lucero shot the film, his feature debut, in Oakland, casting in Los Angeles and the San Francisco Bay Area. He first thought Torres might have been too young for the part, but her acting skills won out. She gained about 15 pounds for the role. Filming took place at Coach Sushi on Oakland's Grand Avenue, the kitchen at the former location of B-Dama on Piedmont Avenue, and the stockroom at Mijori Japanese Restaurant and Sushi Bar. To save production costs, Lucero first thought his actors might learn the craft of sushi making from either YouTube videos or local chefs. Ultimately, he persuaded Andy Matsuda of the Torrance-based Sushi Chef Institute to instruct the cast for free. They trained for two weeks then performed under the occasional supervision of the chefs whose restaurants were used for the filming locations.

== Reception ==
The movie won ten film festival awards and was nominated for two more. The movie ratings aggregator website Rotten Tomatoes has an average score of 6.7 out of 10, with 95% of reviews being positive.
