= Orinda, California =

City in California, United States

- City
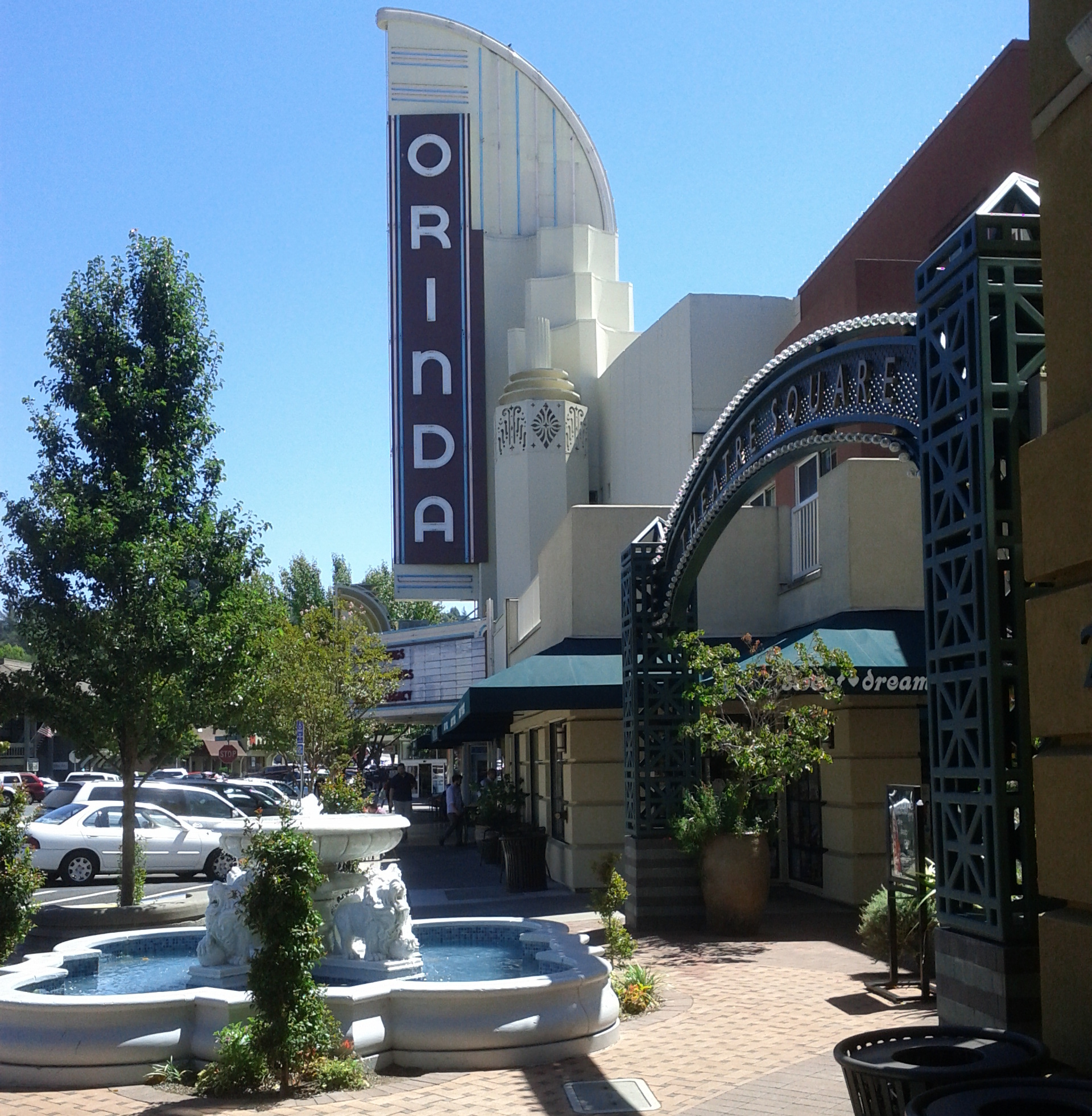
- Downtown Orinda
- Interactive map of Orinda, California
- Location in the United States
- Coordinates: 37°52′58″N 122°10′47″W
- Country: United States
- State: California
- County: Contra Costa
- Incorporated: July 1, 1985

Government
  - Mayor: Latika Malkani
  - State Senator: Tim Grayson (D)
  - State Assembly: Rebecca Bauer-Kahan (D)
  - U. S. Congress: Mark DeSaulnier (D)

Area
  - Total: 12.87 sq mi (33.33 km^{2})
  - Land: 12.85 sq mi (33.29 km^{2})
  - Water: 0.015 sq mi (0.04 km^{2}) 0.12%
- Elevation: 495 ft (151 m)

Population (2020)
  - Total: 19,514
  - Density: 1,518/sq mi (586.2/km^{2})
- Time zone: UTC−8 (PST)
  - Summer (DST): UTC−7 (PDT)
- ZIP Code: 94563
- Area code: 925
- FIPS code: 06-54232
- GNIS feature IDs: 1659313, 2411334
- Website: www.cityoforinda.gov

Orinda is a city in Contra Costa County, California, United States. The city's population as of the 2020 census is estimated at 19,514 residents.

== History ==
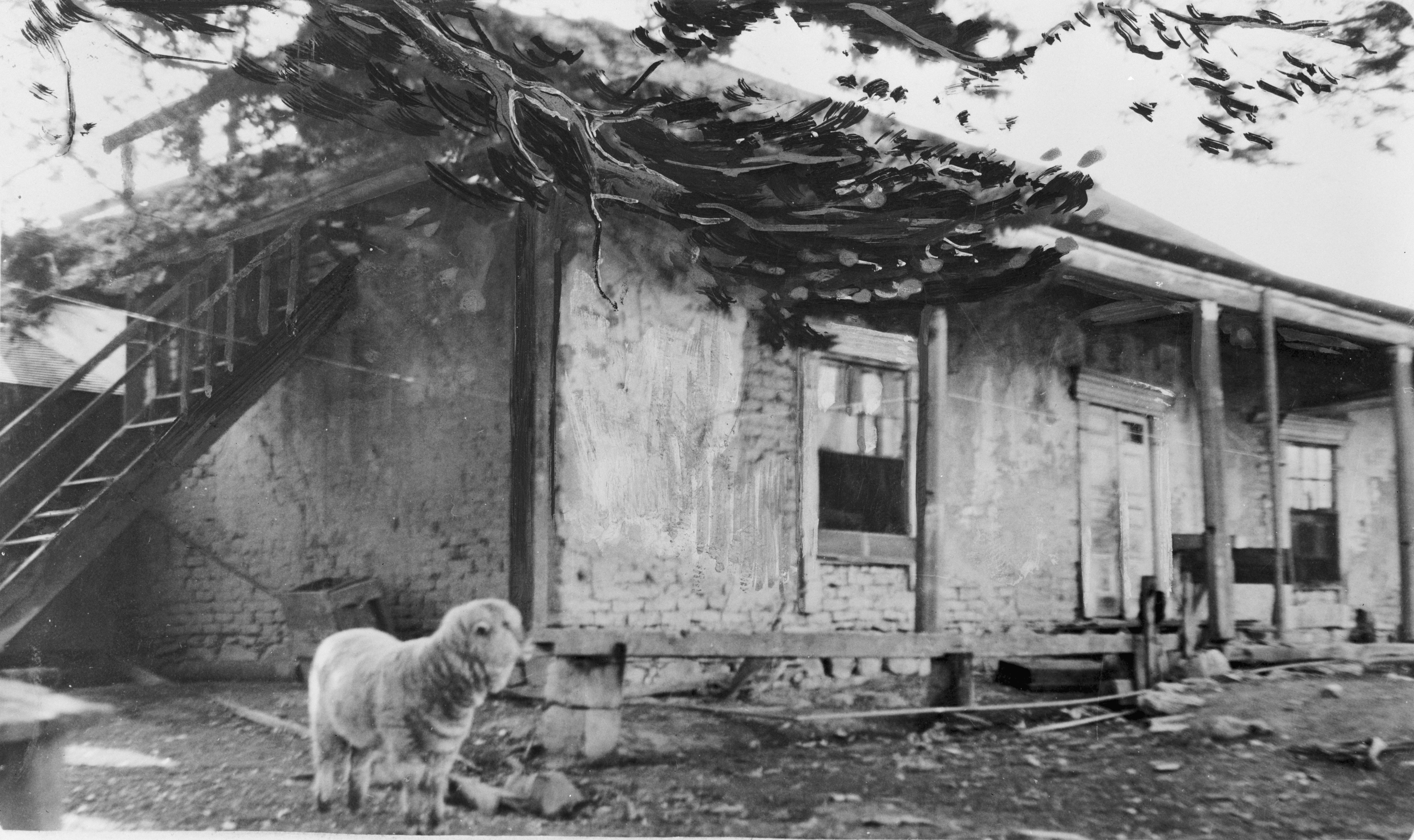
The Moraga Adobe, built in 1841 by Californio ranchero and soldier Joaquín Moraga on his Rancho Laguna de los Palos Colorados

Orinda is located within four Mexican land grants: Rancho Laguna de los Palos Colorados, Rancho Acalanes, Rancho El Sobrante and Rancho Boca de la Cañada del Pinole. The area was originally rural, mainly known for ranching and summer cabins. The Moraga Adobe was built in 1841, and is the oldest building in the East Bay. In 1876, County Sheriff William Walker Camron bought a tract of land east of the Berkeley Hills. His wife, Alice Marsh Camron, loved the poetry of Katherine Philips, who was known as the "Matchless Orinda". Camron named his new tract of land "Orinda Park".

In the 1880s, United States Surveyor General for California Theodore Wagner built an estate he named Orinda Park. The Orinda Park post office opened in 1888. The post office's name was changed to Orinda in 1895. Orinda was also the site of Bryant Station, a stop on the failed California and Nevada Railroad around the turn of the 20th century. Later, the area around Bryant Station was known as Orinda Crossroads.

Orinda's popularity as a year-round residence grew after the 1937 completion of the Caldecott Tunnel, which provided easier access to the west. Bisected by California State Route 24 and framed by its rolling oak-covered hills, the city of Orinda was incorporated on July 1, 1985. Its first mayor was Richard G. Heggie. The city is served by Orinda station on the Bay Area Rapid Transit (BART) Yellow Line and Routes 6 and 606 of the County Connection.

== Geography ==
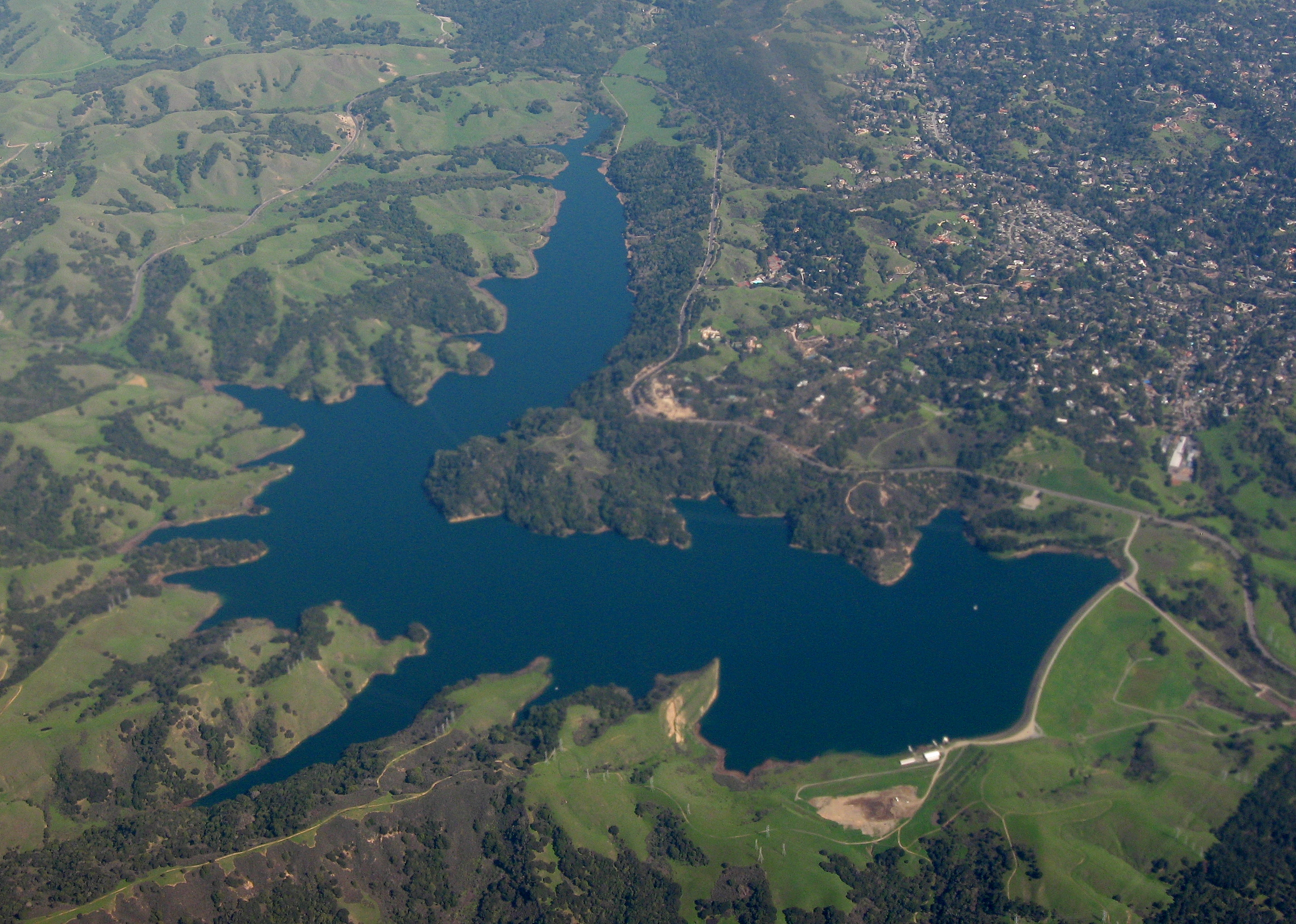
Aerial view of Briones Reservoir

According to the United States Census Bureau, the city has a total area of 12.9 sq mi (33 km^{2}), of which 12.9 sq mi (33 km^{2}) is land and 0.016 sq mi (0.041 km^{2}), or 0.12%, is water.

=== Climate ===
The area is characterized by a warm-summer Mediterranean climate (Köppen climate classification: Csb) with cool, rainy winters and warm, dry summers. Because Orinda is located in a hilly area, microclimates often dominate temperature differences in short distances. The Oakland Hills often block the cool foggy conditions that can be seen in Oakland and the inner Bay. In the summer, fog can spill over the Oakland hills, cooling off the area. Heatwaves from the inland areas can be felt much more in Orinda than in Oakland and the inner Bay during the summer. In the winter, Orinda often sees more precipitation than surrounding areas because of its higher elevation. Snowfall is rare but not unheard of. A dusting of snow may occur in any given year because of the elevation. During stable conditions in the winter, mornings can be cold and frosty in downtown and lower-lying areas, while the higher hills surrounding the area may be several degrees warmer.

Orinda, California

Climate chart (precipitation, max. and min. temperature)
J	F	M	A	M	J	J	A	S	O	N	D
6 54 34	4.9 59 37	4.3 61 38	2.2 68 42	1.2 71 46	0.2 77 49	0 82 52	0.1 81 51	0.4 83 50	1.9 75 44	3.2 65 38	6.2 56 36
- █ Average max. and min. temperatures in °F
- █ Precipitation totals in inches
Metric conversion
J	F	M	A	M	J	J	A	S	O	N	D
152 12 1	123 15 3	109 16 4	55 20 5	31 22 8	4.6 25 10	0.5 28 11	1.3 27 11	10 28 10	47 24 7	82 18 4	158 13 2
- █ Average max. and min. temperatures in °C
- █ Precipitation totals in mm

Climate data for Orinda, California
Month	Jan	Feb	Mar	Apr	May	Jun	Jul	Aug	Sep	Oct	Nov	Dec	Year
Record high °F (°C)	69 (21)	76 (24)	84 (29)	88 (31)	100 (38)	103 (39)	107 (42)	109 (43)	110 (43)	101 (38)	87 (31)	77 (25)	110 (43)
Mean daily maximum °F (°C)	53.8 (12.1)	58.6 (14.8)	61.4 (16.3)	67.5 (19.7)	70.9 (21.6)	77.2 (25.1)	82.8 (28.2)	81.2 (27.3)	82.5 (28.1)	74.6 (23.7)	64.5 (18.1)	56.2 (13.4)	69.3 (20.7)
Daily mean °F (°C)	44.0 (6.7)	47.5 (8.6)	49.9 (9.9)	54.5 (12.5)	58.2 (14.6)	63.3 (17.4)	66.7 (19.3)	66.3 (19.1)	66.3 (19.1)	59.6 (15.3)	51.4 (10.8)	46.0 (7.8)	56.1 (13.4)
Mean daily minimum °F (°C)	34.3 (1.3)	36.5 (2.5)	38.4 (3.6)	41.6 (5.3)	45.6 (7.6)	49.4 (9.7)	51.6 (10.9)	51.3 (10.7)	50.0 (10.0)	44.3 (6.8)	38.3 (3.5)	35.8 (2.1)	43.1 (6.2)
Record low °F (°C)	15 (−9)	18 (−8)	23 (−5)	28 (−2)	32 (0)	35 (2)	42 (6)	40 (4)	32 (0)	26 (−3)	22 (−6)	19 (−7)	15 (−9)
Average precipitation inches (mm)	5.99 (152)	4.86 (123)	4.31 (109)	2.16 (55)	1.22 (31)	0.18 (4.6)	0.02 (0.51)	0.05 (1.3)	0.41 (10)	1.85 (47)	3.24 (82)	6.24 (158)	30.53 (773.41)
Average precipitation days (≥ 0.01 in)	11	9	10	5	4	1	0	1	1	4	7	11	64
Source: Western Regional Climate Center

== Demographics ==
The historic Merrill House, built in a Monterey Revival style

Historical population
Census	Pop.	Note	%±
1960	5,568		—
1970	6,790		21.9%
1980	16,825		147.8%
1990	16,642		−1.1%
2000	17,599		5.8%
2010	17,643		0.3%
2020	19,514		10.6%
U.S. Decennial Census

=== 2020 census ===
As of the 2020 census, Orinda had a population of 19,514 and a population density of 1,518.4 inhabitants per square mile (586.3/km^{2}). The median age was 46.6 years. 24.9% of residents were under the age of 18, and 23.4% were 65 years of age or older. For every 100 females, there were 96.6 males, and for every 100 females age 18 and over, there were 94.3 males age 18 and over.

99.2% of residents lived in urban areas, while 0.8% lived in rural areas.

The census reported that 99.8% of the population lived in households, 0.0% lived in non-institutionalized group quarters, and 0.2% were institutionalized. There were 6,957 households, out of which 38.2% had children under the age of 18 living in them. Of all households, 72.6% were married-couple households, 2.8% were cohabiting-couple households, 8.6% had a male householder with no spouse or partner present, and 16.0% had a female householder with no spouse or partner present. About 16.1% of all households were made up of individuals, and 11.9% had someone living alone who was 65 years of age or older. The average household size was 2.8. There were 5,597 families (80.5% of all households).

There were 7,232 housing units at an average density of 562.7 units per square mile (217.3 units/km^{2}), of which 6,957 (96.2%) were occupied. Of occupied units, 88.1% were owner-occupied and 11.9% were renter-occupied. The homeowner vacancy rate was 0.7%, and the rental vacancy rate was 3.2%.

Racial composition as of the 2020 census
Race	Number	Percentage
White	13,423	68.8%
Black or African American	196	1.0%
American Indian and Alaska Native	31	0.2%
Asian	3,401	17.4%
Native Hawaiian and Other Pacific Islander	20	0.1%
Some other race	282	1.4%
Two or more races	2,161	11.1%
Hispanic or Latino (of any race)	1,285	6.6%

=== 2023 ACS estimates ===
In 2023, the US Census Bureau estimated that 19.9% of the population were foreign-born. Of all people aged 5 or older, 80.5% spoke only English at home, 3.1% spoke Spanish, 6.7% spoke other Indo-European languages, 9.2% spoke Asian or Pacific Islander languages, and 0.5% spoke other languages. Of those aged 25 or older, 98.1% were high school graduates and 85.4% had a bachelor's degree.

The median household income was over $250,000, and the per capita income was $139,503. About 0.4% of families and 2.0% of the population were below the poverty line.

== Government ==
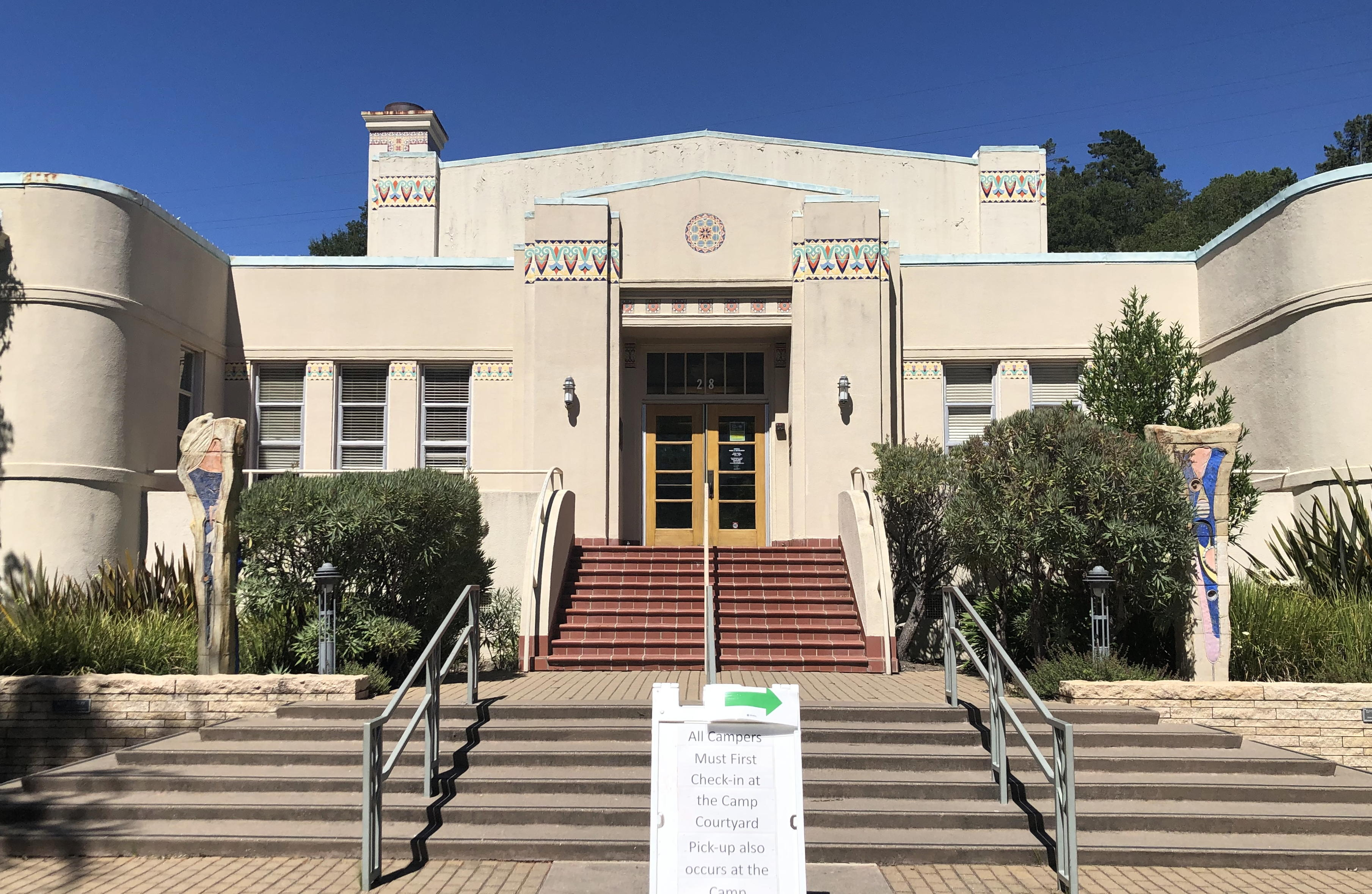
Orinda Community Center

As of February 10, 2019, Orinda has 14,020 registered voters, with 6,692 (47.7%) registered as Democrats, 3,176 (22.7%) registered as Republicans, and 3,662 (26.1%) decline to state voters.

Once a Republican stronghold, Orinda has trended Democratic since 1992.

Orinda vote by party in presidential elections
Year	Democratic	Republican
2024	77.4% 9,625	19.6% 2,442
2020	78.8% 10,435	19.3% 2,561
2016	74.2% 8,557	19.9% 2,295
2012	62.8% 7,158	34.7% 3,958
2008	67.5% 7,864	30.8% 3,594
2004	61.5% 7,025	37.2% 4,245
2000	51.5% 5,515	44.3% 4,746
1996	46.4% 4,778	45.1% 4,642
1992	42.6% 4,719	37.5% 4,163
1988	39.0% 4,163	59.9% 6,384

== Education ==
Orinda has four public elementary schools: Sleepy Hollow Elementary, Wagner Ranch Elementary, Glorietta Elementary and Del Rey Elementary. Orinda Intermediate School is the only middle school. Together, these five schools make up the Orinda Union School District. Orinda's high school, Miramonte High School, is a part of the Acalanes Union High School District.

Orinda is home to three private educational establishments: Orinda Academy, Holden High School, and Fountainhead Montessori School. Of these, two (OA & Holden) are private high schools, while Fountainhead Montessori School services kindergarten through fifth grade.

The Contra Costa County Library has a branch in Orinda.

== Notable people ==
- Poul Anderson, science fiction author
- Troy Auzenne, football star
- Bryan Barker, NFL football punter
- Jim Barnett, Golden State Warriors player and TV color commentator
- Chris Bauer, actor who was raised in Orinda
- Theodore Temple (Ted) Beckett, football star
- Drew Bennett, former NFL wide receiver; graduated from Miramonte High School in 1996
- Nicole Branagh, Olympic beach volleyball player
- Matt Cain, pitcher for San Francisco Giants
- Kirsten Costas, high school student murdered by her classmate, Bernadette Protti, in 1984
- Steph Curry, NBA player Golden State Warriors lived in Orinda 2013-2016
- Paul Dini, writer, cartoonist; lived in Orinda from 1963 to 1988
- Ken Dorsey, former quarterback for San Francisco 49ers and Cleveland Browns
- Patricia C. Dunn, former Chairwoman of the Board of Hewlett-Packard
- Sheila Escovedo, drummer and percussionist
- Adonal Foyle, NBA center for Golden State Warriors and Orlando Magic
- John Hammergren, CEO of McKesson; highest-paid CEO in US (2011–2013)
- John Hampton, co-founder of Toys for Tots
- Sabrina Ionescu, WNBA star with the New York Liberty
- Brett Jackson, MLB player
- Robert Karplus, physicist and educator
- Hans Kelsen, one of preeminent jurists of 20th Century
- Harry Arthur "Cookie" Lavagetto (1912–1990), MLB third baseman, manager and coach, and pinch-hitter
- Daniel Levitin, best-selling author, cognitive neuroscientist, musician
- David Marchick, Washington, D.C. lobbyist
- Vegas Matt, gambler and Internet personality
- Megan Reid, soccer player
- Wayne F. Miller, photographer
- Karen Moe, Olympic swimming gold medalist
- William Penn Mott Jr., director of National Park Service from 1985 to 1989
- Hans Niemann, chess grandmaster
- Heather Petri, Olympic water polo player
- Susan Polk, Orinda housewife sentenced to 16-to-life for murder of husband, Felix Polk
- Gary Radnich, news broadcaster
- Julie Rubio, filmmaker
- Sam Shankland, chess grandmaster and 2018 US Chess Champion
- Dana Sparks, actress and spokesperson, Falcon Crest, Passions, L.A. Law, L'Oréal, Mercedes-Benz
- Owsley Stanley, audio engineer and legendary psychedelic chemist
- Jeremy Stoppelman, Founder of Yelp.com
- Rawson Marshall Thurber, filmmaker and actor
- Nicolle Wallace, political commentator, former White House Communications Director and senior adviser to John McCain's presidential campaign
- Claudell Washington, former Major League Baseball player
- Will Wright, designer of computer games such as SimCity and The Sims
