= Hospital Creek =

Hospital Creek or Arroyo del Osnital
- Etymology: Spanish
- Native name: Arroyo de Ospital (Spanish)

Location
- Country: United States
- State: California
- Region: Stanislaus County, San Joaquin County

Physical characteristics
- Source
  - location: 2.25 miles southeast of Mount Oso, Stanislaus County
  - coordinates: 37°28′41″N 121°21′11″W
- Mouth: mouth
  - location: a former slough of the San Joaquin River, Stanislaus County
  - coordinates: 37°37′07″N 121°12′06″W
  - elevation: 33 ft (10 m)
- Length: 18 mi (29 km)

Basin features
- River system: San Joaquin River

Hospital Creek, originally Arroyo de Ospital, or Arroyo del Osnital is a tributary of the San Joaquin River draining eastern slopes of a part of the Diablo Range within San Joaquin County.

The creek is approximately 18 miles (29 km) long,

== Course ==
It has its source on the southeast flank of Mount Oso, in Stanislaus County. From there it flows northwest then north through Hospital Creek Canyon around Mount Oso into San Joaquin County. It then turns east to dip back briefly over the border into Stanislaus County before turning back north into San Joaquin County flowing then northeast to emerge from the Diablo Range foothills.

From the canyon mouth it flows east into the Central Valley of California, United States. Though its downstream end is uncertain as it disappears into a former slough of the San Joaquin River in the San Joaquin Valley in Stanislaus County.

== History ==
Originally called Arroyo de Ospital in the Diseño del Rancho Pescadero, this creek was a watering place on the El Camino Viejo. A map of routes to the southern gold mines in 1851 showed this creek as Arroyo del Osnital. By 1857 Britton & Rey's Map Of The State Of California referred to the creek as Arroyo de Osnita. However, by 1873, its name was changed to what it closely sounds like in English and was referred to as Hospital Creek on an official state of California Map.

== Geology ==
East of the San Joaquin Fault in the vicinity of Hospital Creek there is a flow pattern of alluvium that has been reported as a mud flow. This flow pattern was deposited in the early Holocene or the late Pleistocene.

== See also ==
- Ingram Creek
