= Gabriel Moraga =

Spanish explorer (1765–1823)

- Born: 1765; Fronteras, New Navarre
- Died: June 14, 1823 (aged 57–58); Santa Barbara, California
- Occupations: Explorer, officer
- Spouse: Ana Joaquina Alvarado

Gabriel Moraga (1765 – June 14, 1823) was a Sonoran-born Californio soldier, administrator, and explorer. As an explorer in Alta California, Gabriel Moraga found and gave names to a number of rivers in the Central Valley. Gabriel's son Joaquín was the namesake of the city of Moraga, California.

== De Anza expeditions ==
Gabriel Moraga was the son of the expeditionary José Joaquín Moraga, who helped to lead the de Anza Expedition to California in 1774. The expeditions of Juan Bautista de Anza aimed to explore and consolidate the north-western limits of Spain's colonial claims in Alta California. The first expedition in 1774 established a new overland route from Sonora, Mexico, to Mission San Gabriel. The second, in 1775–6, went as far north as San Francisco Bay.

The second expedition included a group of colonists for settlement at the newly established San Francisco Presidio, Mission San Francisco de Asís and Mission Santa Clara de Asís. The colonists included the Moraga family. José Moraga became commander of the garrison at San Francisco Presidio, and Gabriel became a soldier as well.

== Early career ==
As a corporal, Gabriel Moraga was appointed comisionado (military administrator) of the Pueblo of San Jose, some years after its establishment by his father in 1777. When another civilian town, the Villa de Branciforte, was established in 1797 (part of today's city of Santa Cruz), Corporal Moraga was transferred to the same position there and was replaced at San Jose by Corporal Ignacio Vallejo, father of Mariano Vallejo.

== Central Valley ==
Gabriel Moraga was one of the first Europeans to see the Central Valley of California. He led the first official Spanish expeditions to explore the valley in 1806–1808 and encountered numerous villages, including the village of Wá’peat. Many of the names which Moraga gave to places in the region (especially rivers) have survived, often in shortened and/or anglicized form:

- Sacramento River, after Moraga's Río del Sacramento (River of the Sacrament), later applied to the capital of California and its county (originally, Moraga had used the term Río del Sacramento to refer to Feather River only, while the lower Sacramento river was known as Río de San Francisco)
- San Joaquin River, later applied to the San Joaquin Valley and San Joaquin County
- Merced River, which Moraga named Río de Nuestra Señora de la Merced (River of Our Lady of Mercy), later applied to the city of Merced and Merced County
- Kings River, which he named Río de los Santos Reyes (River of the Holy Kings), later applied to Kings County
- Calaveras River or Río de las Calaveras (named after Native American skulls found there), later applied to Calaveras County
- Mariposa River and the old name of the Chowchilla River, Big Mariposa River, later applied to the town of Mariposa and Mariposa County which was named after the swarms of butterflies Moraga found in the region of Chowchilla.

Not all of Moraga's place names have survived. Today's Stanislaus River was named Rio de Nuestra Señora de Guadalupe by Moraga. Even at the early date of Moraga's expedition, the name was redundant. Today's Guadalupe River was named in 1776 by the de Anza expedition.

== Legacy ==
Many years after Gabriel Moraga's death, his widow Ana Joaquina Alvarado (1788–1863) was granted (in 1841) the Rancho Cañada Larga o Verde, not far from Mission San Buenaventura. Gabriel and Ana's son Joaquín was co-grantee of Rancho Laguna de los Palos Colorados in present-day Contra Costa County, part of which is now the city of Moraga.
