= Moraga Adobe =

Historic house in California, United States

- U.S. National Register of Historic Places
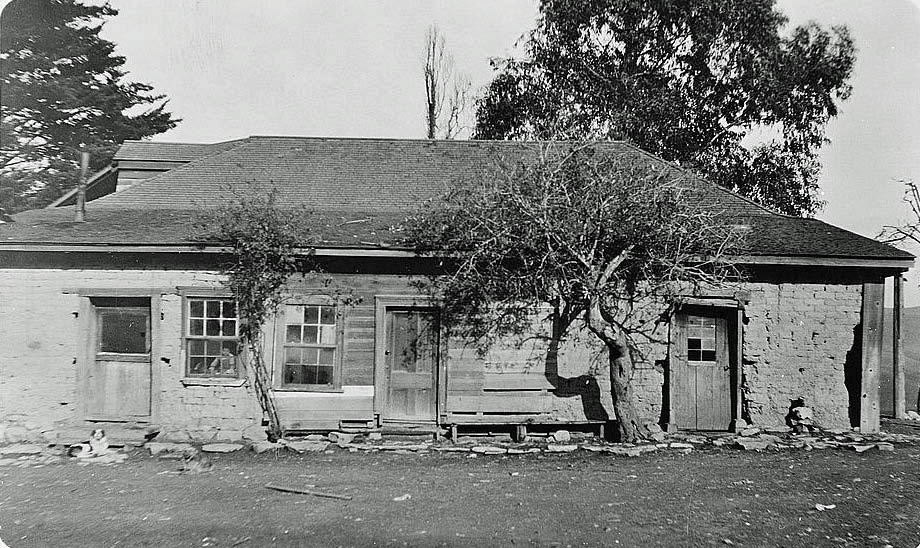

- Location within California Location within the United States
- Location: 60 Adobe Lane, Orinda, California
- Coordinates: 37°50′36″N 122°9′9″W
- Area: 0.1 acres (0.040 ha)
- Architect: Joaquin Moraga
- Architectural style: Mud Adobe
- NRHP reference No.: 72000223
- Added to NRHP: March 16, 1972

The Moraga Adobe is located at 60 Adobe Lane in Orinda, California. It was built by Don Joaquin Moraga who was the grandson of Jose Joaquin Moraga an early Spanish explorer in California who founded the city of San Jose, California. In 1835, Mexico granted 13,326 acres (5,393 ha), El Rancho Laguna de los Palos Colorados, to Joaquin Moraga and his cousin Juan Bernal. Six years later in 1841, Joaquin built this house, which is the oldest of the five surviving adobe houses in Contra Costa County. The adobe sits on a knoll at the center of the 20-acre (8.1 ha) property of what is left of the original land grant. The house has been restored and remodeled twice since it was photographed for HABS, first in 1941 when Katharine Brown White Irvine of Oakland, California purchased the old adobe, making additions such as adding three bedrooms and a veranda, and covering the adobe walls and again in 1964 when it was incorporated into a private home. The house is not accessible to the public and it is fenced off. However, it was photographed in 1922 for the Historical American Building Survey (HABS). Today, the Moraga Adobe is privately owned and unoccupied. The overall condition of the original adobe section and the more modern addition is neglected, but the building appears sound. The surrounding property was recently purchased, and the new owners have boarded up the windows to prevent vandalism and trespassing. The Moraga Adobe has been designated as a Historical Landmark by the City of Orinda and the State of California. A campaign has been started to purchase the property and restore the house to its 1848 configuration, to be used as a museum and educational site.

== See also ==
- National Register of Historic Places listings in Contra Costa County, California
