= Ingram Creek =

River in the United States of America

Ingram Creek, originally Arroyo de la Suerte, is a 14-mile-long (23 km) tributary of the San Joaquin River in Stanislaus County, in the San Joaquin Valley of California.

The mouth of Ingram Creek is located at 37°36′52″N 121°12′24″W at an elevation of 46 feet (14 m) where it has its confluence with a slough of the San Joaquin River. The upper reach of the creek runs through Ingram Canyon. The source of Ingram Creek is located at the head of Ingram Canyon at the confluence of the source of Ingram Creek is located at the confluence of Grummett Creek and Cedar Spring Gulch at 37°31′27″N 121°20′31″W at an elevation of 880 feet (270 m). Its headwaters are in the Diablo Range. It is a western tributary of the San Joaquin River.

== Geology ==
Ingram Creek eroded from the following formations; the Franciscan Assemblage, Mesozoic ultrabasic intrusive rocks, and marine sediments of Upper Cretaceous, Paleocene and Eocene age. Marine sediments have been leached by groundwater, causing an elevated concentration of brine in the groundwater at depths of approximately 600 feet.

== See also ==
- Hospital Creek
