= Qualls =

Qualls may refer to:

== Places in the United States ==
- Qualls, Oklahoma, a small community in Cherokee County, Oklahoma
- Fort Qualls, near Crawford, Texas

== People ==
- Ashley Qualls (born 1990), American entrepreneur
- Chad Qualls (born 1978), American baseball pitcher
- DJ Qualls (born 1978), American actor and comedian
- Elijah Qualls (born 1995), American football player
- Henry Qualls (1934–2003), American Texas and country blues guitarist and singer
- Jim Qualls (born 1946), American baseball outfielder
- Larry Qualls, American visual arts archival documentarian, editor, and art critic
- Lonnie Qualls (born 1932), American football and baseball coach
- Michael Qualls (born 1994), American basketball player for Hapoel Gilboa Galil of the Israeli Basketball Premier League
- Roxanne Qualls (born 1953), mayor of Cincinnati, Ohio, from 1993 to 1999
- Sasha Blackfox-Qualls, Cherokee Nation politician

== See also ==
- Dave Quall (1936–2020), American politician from the state of Washington
