= Leonard Michaels =

American writer

- Leonard Michaels
- Born: January 2, 1933; New York City, New York, United States
- Died: May 10, 2003 (aged 70); California, U.S.
- Education: University of Michigan
- Occupations: Essayist; screenwriter; novelist

Leonard Michaels (January 2, 1933 – May 10, 2003) was an American writer of short stories, novels, and essays, and a professor of English at the University of California, Berkeley.

== Early life and education ==
Michaels was born in New York City to Jewish parents; his father was born in Poland. He attended New York University and was awarded a BA degree, and then earned an MA and PhD in English literature from the University of Michigan. After receiving his PhD, Michaels moved to Berkeley, California, and become professor of English at the University of California.

== Literary career ==
In 1969, Michaels' first book was published – Going Places, a collection of sexually charged short stories.

His follow-up book, another collection of short stories titled I Would Have Saved Them If I Could, was published in 1975.

Michaels' first novel, released in 1981, was The Men's Club. It is a comedy that simultaneously attacks and celebrates the absurdities of men as they gather in an urban support group. In 1986, the novel was made into a film of the same name, directed by Peter Medak with the screenplay by Michaels and starring Roy Scheider, Harvey Keitel, Stockard Channing, Jennifer Jason Leigh, and Frank Langella.

Michaels' second and last novel was published in 1992. Titled Sylvia, it is a fictionalized memoir of his first wife, Sylvia Bloch, who died by suicide. Sylvia is described in the book as "abnormally bright" but prone to violent rages, "like a madwoman imitating a college student." Sylvia incorporates passages from Michaels' diary, selections of which were published under the title Time Out of Mind in 1999.

Michaels became a regular contributor to The New Yorker magazine in the 1990s.

He was a professor of English at the University of California, Berkeley.

== Personal life ==
Michaels took part in anti-Vietnam war protests in the San Francisco Bay Area.

He is interred at Oakmont Memorial Park, in Lafayette, California.

Michaels had a daughter with his third wife, the poet Brenda Hillman. His son Jesse Michaels (from his second marriage) was the vocalist and primary lyricist in the punk rock band Operation Ivy in the late 1980s.

== Selected publications ==
=== Short story collections ===
- Going Places (1969, ISBN 978-0-374-16496-6)
- I Would Have Saved Them If I Could (1975, ISBN 978-0-374-17411-8)
- Shuffle (1990, ISBN 978-0-374-26349-2)
- A Girl With a Monkey: New and Selected Stories (2000, ISBN 978-1-56279-120-9)
- The Collected Stories (2007, ISBN 978-0-374-12654-4)
- The Nachman Stories (2017, ISBN 978-1-911-54707-5)

=== Novels ===
- The Men's Club (1981, ISBN 978-0-374-20782-3)
- Sylvia: A Fictional Memoir (1992, ISBN 978-1-56279-029-5)

=== Essay collections ===
- To Feel These Things (1993, ISBN 978-1-56279-040-0)
- The Essays of Leonard Michaels (2009, ISBN 978-0-374-14880-5)

=== Other books ===
- A Cat (1995, ISBN 978-1-57322-013-2)
- Time Out of Mind: The Diaries of Leonard Michaels, 1961-1995 (1999, ISBN 978-1-57322-819-0)
