= Alan Chin (artist) =

American artist (born 1987)

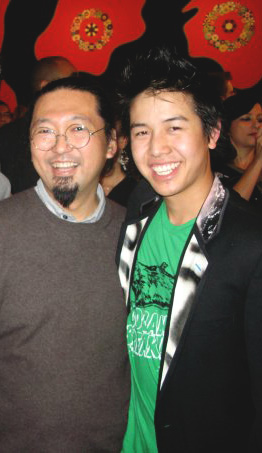
- Alan Chin on the right of Artist Takashi Murakami in 2007
- Born: Alan Christopher Chin; October 15, 1987 (age 38); Berkeley, California, United States
- Education: California College of the Arts, Academie Minerva, and Hanze University Groningen
- Known for: Painting, Sculpture, Photography, Film, Performance, Ceramics
- Notable work: Wired to be United Hearts of San Francisco (2004), "Elegy to Steffen Eric Ryge" 2006, "Connected" 2018 Representing the United States of America, at the East Lake International Ecological Sculpture Biennale in Wuhan, China.
- Movement: Contemporary

Alan Christopher Chin (born in Berkeley, California October 15, 1987) is a contemporary American artist. He lives and maintains a studio in Hawthorne, California, working in variety of traditional mediums including, ceramics, film, painting, photography, sculpture, and performance.

== Education ==
He graduated from Acalanes High School in Lafayette, California in 2005, receiving the Brad Chinn Leadership Award, Citizen of the Year, and United States Congressional recognition for Art. He attended Academie Minerva in Groningen, Netherlands and received his BFA in Ceramics and Painting (2011) at the California College of the Arts in Oakland, California

== Early life ==
Greatly inspired by his creative family, surroundings, and nature; he studied traditional Japanese landscape, bonsai, and horticulture under Japanese Bonsai Masters, John Naka, Kunatoshi Akabane, and Yutaka Kimura. At age 11, he was chosen to have one of his bonsai trees included in the prestigious National Cherry Blossom Festival Bonsai Show in San Francisco. By the age of 15 he was the youngest artist to be selected to paint one of the Hearts in San Francisco, benefiting the San Francisco General Hospital Foundation. Chin was assistant to American Painter Raymond Saunders from 2006 till 2013.

== Work ==
His work has been shown in cities around the world and at institutions such as Berkeley Art Museum, California College of the Arts, Richmond Art Center, and the Tokyo Metropolitan Art Museum. Chin taught Painting Atelier at California College of the Arts and was invited back as a visiting lecturer in Ceramics. He has helped to expand the Oakland Art Murmur (Oakland's First Friday Event) through increased awareness of art and bringing in the work of both established, emerging, local and international artists. In 2017, Chin was selected to represent the United States at the first East Lake International Ecological Sculpture Biennale in Wuhan, China.

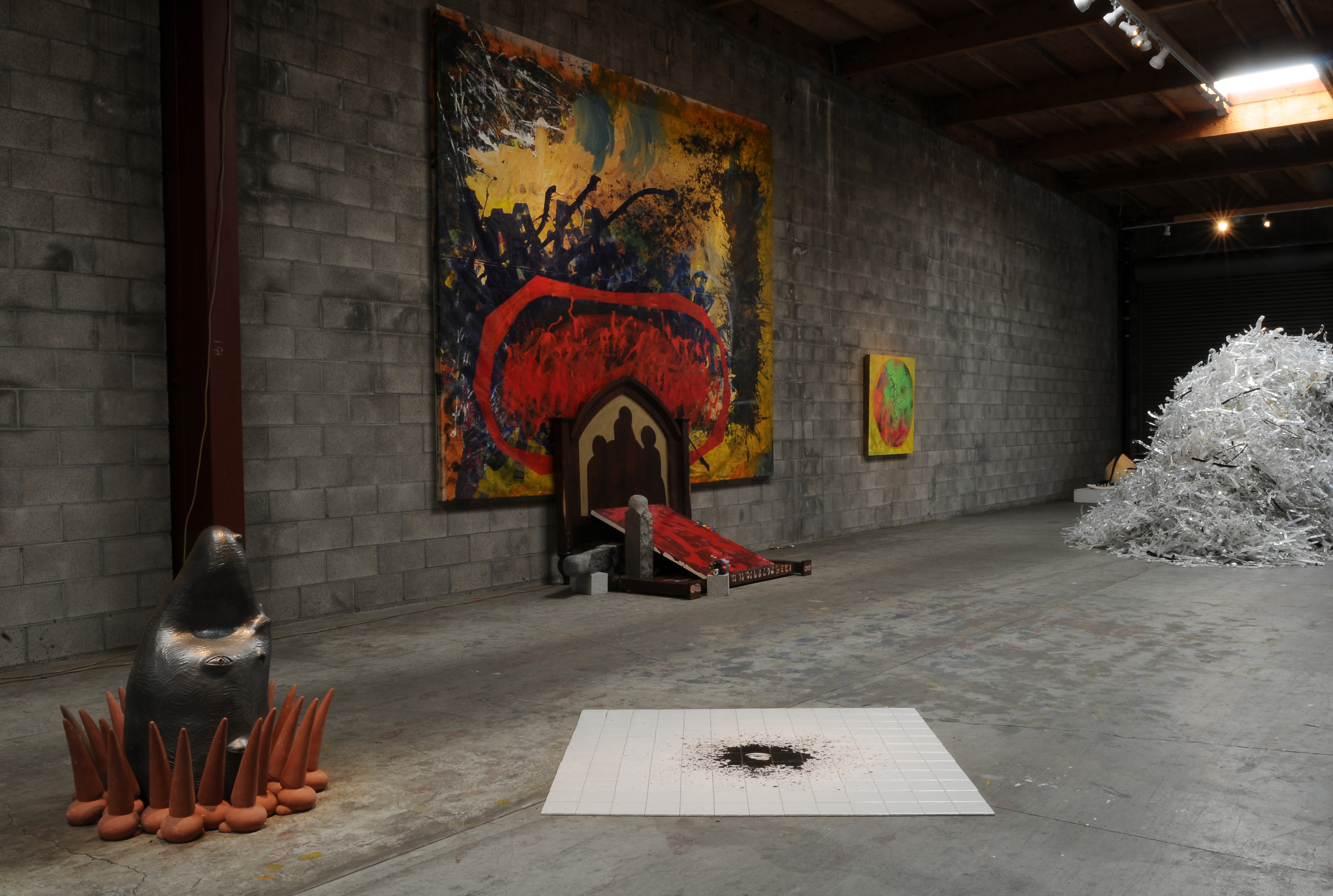
Photograph of Alan Chin's solo show "Time Travel: Journey Through A Dream," at Firehouse South Gallery in Oakland, Ca. (2009)
