= The Bad Girl's Guide =

- Genre: Sitcom
- Created by: Jennifer Heath; Michele J. Wolff; Cameron Tuttle
- Based on: The Bad Girls Guide by Cameron Tuttle
- Developed by: Robin Schiff
- Starring: Jenny McCarthy; Christina Moore; Marcelle Larice; Stephanie Childers; Johnathan McClain
- Country of origin: United States
- Original language: English
- No. of seasons: 1
- No. of episodes: 6

Production
- Executive producers: Tony Krantz; Robin Schiff
- Production companies: Palm Tree Productions; Flame Television; Paramount Network Television

Original release
- Network: UPN
- Release: May 24 – July 5, 2005

The Bad Girl's Guide is an American sitcom starring Jenny McCarthy, Marcelle Larice, Christina Moore, Stephanie Childers, and Johnathan McClain. The series aired on UPN from May 24 to July 5, 2005.

The TV show was based on the best-selling The Bad Girls Guide by Cameron Tuttle, who was the show's co-creator and co-executive producer.

== Cast ==
- Jenny McCarthy as JJ
- Christina Moore as Sarah
- Marcelle Larice as Holly
- Stephanie Childers as Irene
- Johnathan McClain as Patric

== Episodes ==
No.	Title	Directed by	Written by	Original release date
1	"The Guide to Procrastination"	Ellen Gittelsohn	Robin Schiff	May 24, 2005
2	"The Guide to Switching Partners"	Lee Shallat Chemel	Wendy Goldman	May 31, 2005
3	"The Guide to Being in the Mood"	Lee Shallat Chemel	Robin Schiff	June 7, 2005
4	"The Guide to Doing It Now"	Arlene Sanford	Darin Henry	June 21, 2005
5	"The Guide to Baby Talk"	Barnet Kellman	Wendy Goldman & Cameron Tuttle	June 28, 2005
6	"The Guide to In and Out"	Katy Garretson	Rob Lotterstein & Robin Schiff	July 5, 2005
