= Stephen Joseph Wampler =

Biography of Stephen Wampler

Stephen Joseph Wampler is an American documentary producer and mountaineer who was born with cerebral palsy that affects the entire left side of his body. Wampler uses an electric wheelchair.

In 2002, Wampler and his wife Elizabeth founded The Stephen J. Wampler Foundation and “Camp Wamp”, a sleep-away camp for disabled children, that was opened in 2004.

Wampler's documentary, Wampler’s Ascent, is about his accomplishment of being the first person with cerebral palsy to climb El Capitan Mountain.

== Education ==
Wampler graduated from Acalanes High School and attended University of California at Davis until 1992 and graduated with a BS in Environmental Engineering.
