= Larry Northern =

American realtor (born 1946)

Larry Chad Northern (born circa 1946) is a Former President of the Waco Realtors, and owner of a Century 21 franchise, realtor and president of a local rifle and pistol range from Waco, Texas. In August 2005 Northern was arrested and charged with criminal mischief after he drove his pickup truck through the Arlington West display of memorial crosses (each bearing the name of an American soldier killed in Iraq) that had been set up at Camp Casey, the protest site organized by peace activist Cindy Sheehan near the ranch of President George W. Bush near Crawford, Texas. Northern replied in the Waco Tribune-Herald, "I have been to Arlington Cemetery in Washington D.C. It is a beautifully manicured and stately place for our honored soldiers who have given their lives for our country and freedom. There laid to rest with dignity and respect ... I feel deep compassion for them and their families. The memories of these brave men deserve the honor, care and respect afforded them there. There is no honor or respect by demeaning their service to their country or their mission by placing sticks in a ditch with their names attached with rubber bands and typing paper. Their spirit called out for someone to help them. Someone did." Waco Tribune Herald, December 2, 2006,

Northern's truck, which was dragging a large pipe at the time of the vandalism, damaged several of the crosses, and no one was injured.

On January 17, 2001, the Baylor Lariat quoted Northern as saying, "There is a county ordinance that has recently been passed to keep traffic off the road near [the president's] ranch."

Arresting Officer Sheriff Lynch confirmed Tuesday that he and Northern both attend the Columbus Avenue Baptist Church in Waco.

"I am not going to talk about it," Lynch said. "I know his family".

Waco attorney Russ Hunt, who represented Northern, said Northern acted out of respect for the troops fighting in Iraq. "It was an unfortunate situation," Hunt said. "Larry couldn't stand the sight of those troops laying in the ditch. His act, at least in his mind, was an act of honor and respect to those troops. It wasn't something that was meant to dishonor the troops. He didn't think it was honorable for those troops to be symbolically buried in a ditch." Northern served 11 months and three days in the Army in Vietnam. He was wounded in the Mekong Delta in southeast Vietnam in 1969, suffering permanent nerve damage to his neck when shrapnel tore through his arm and severed the carotid artery in his neck. Waco Tribune Herald, December 2, 2006,

Precinct 4 McLennan County Commissioner Ray Meadows defeated Northern in the 1986 Republican primary but said Northern recently played at a golf tournament held to raise money for Meadows' latest re-election bid. He also said that as far as he was concerned, Larry was a Vietnam veteran. Waco Tribune Herald, December 2, 2006

== See also ==
- Cindy Sheehan
- Arlington West
- Larry Mattlage
