= Lafayette hillside memorial =

Veterans' memorial in California

Coordinates: 37.8951°N 122.1238°W

The Lafayette hillside memorial is a collection of religious symbols, accompanied by a large sign, in Lafayette, California. The memorial commemorates soldiers killed in the Iraq War and War in Afghanistan, with the sign containing a running total of the death count as recorded by the US Department of Defense. The monument began to raise controversy in November 2006.

The hillside, overlooking State Route 24 and Lafayette BART station, was owned by 81-year-old Louise Clark, widow of Johnson Clark, until she died. Johnson Clark was a local developer and World War II veteran. The monument was erected in late 2006 by Jeffrey Heaton, a long-time anti-war protester, and Louise Clark. Their first 19 crosses were quickly removed by vandals. In November 2006 Heaton and Clark re-added the crosses onto Clark's property, this time with 300 crosses and a large sign that read: "In Memory of 2839 U.S. Troops Killed In Iraq". By February 26, 2007, the number of crosses, mixed with Stars of David, Islamic crescents, and other religious symbols, had passed 2,500. Crosses have been added by volunteers and some paid for by the Lamorinda Peace Group and Grandmothers for Peace. Protests of the memorial have been led by Lafayette Flag Brigade which organizes a competing, remembrance flag display annually on September 11.

The city ordinance allowed a 32-square-foot (3.0 m^{2}) sign on the property and did not limit the number of crosses. The organizers initially had an approximately 64-square-foot (5.9 m^{2}) sign, but reduced it to 32 square feet (3.0 m^{2}) to comply with the city ordinance. The sign was updated every week to show the new official death toll for soldiers in Iraq and Afghanistan. In 2022, the sign was changed to simply read "Remember".

As of 2014, a permanent memorial has been proposed on the site although the original intent was for the display to come down when U.S. troops came home from Iraq and Afghanistan.

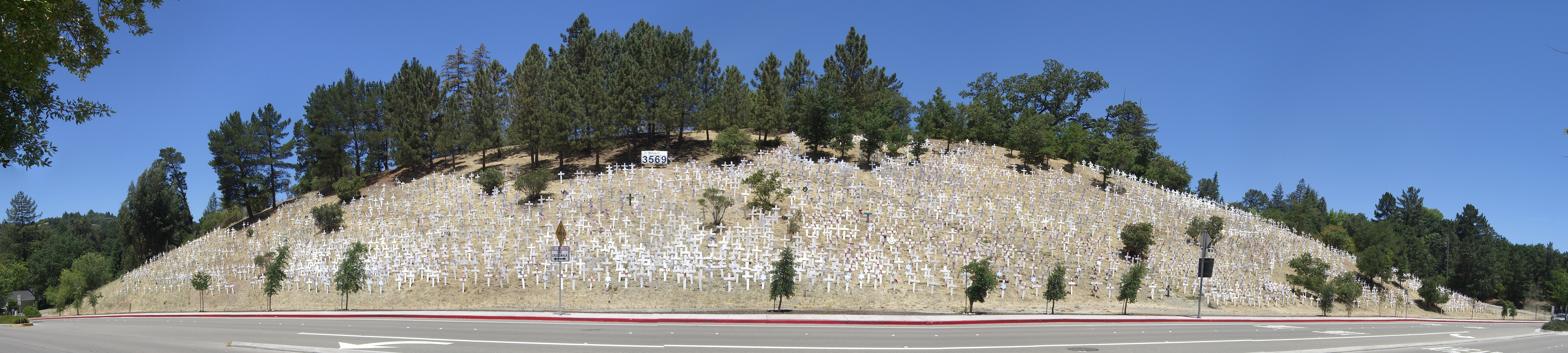
View of the memorial from the Lafayette BART station parking lot

== See also ==
- Arlington West, a similar display in Santa Monica, California
