= Jon-Erik Beckjord =

American paranormal investigator (1939–2008)

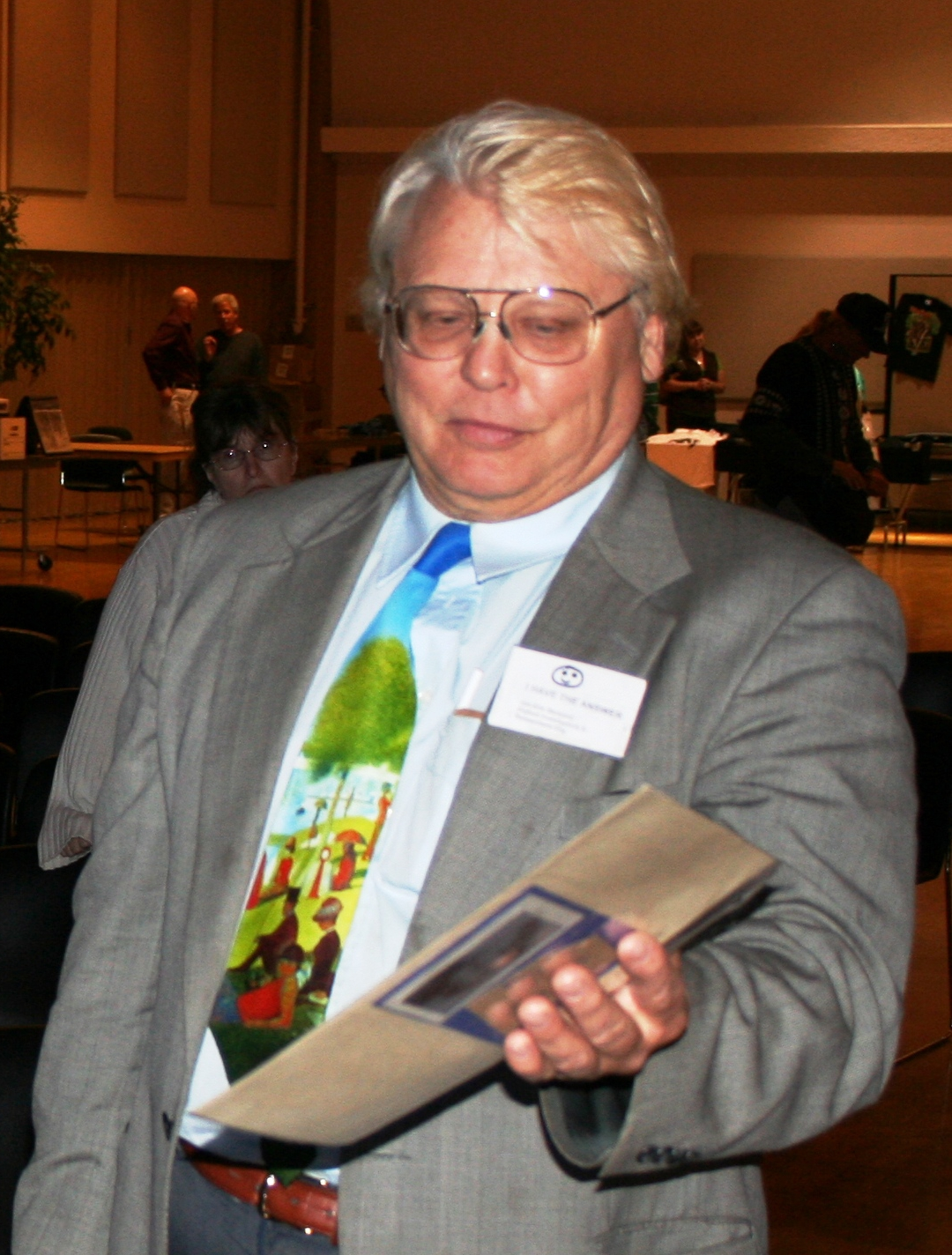
- Born: Cedric Jon Beckjord; April 26, 1939; Duluth, Minnesota, U.S.
- Died: June 22, 2008 (aged 69); Lafayette, California, U.S.
- Education: Tulane University (BS); University of California, Berkeley (MBA)
- Occupations: Paranormal investigator; photographer

Jon-Erik Beckjord (April 26, 1939 – June 22, 2008) was an American paranormal investigator, photographer, and cryptozoologist interested in UFOs, crop circles, the Loch Ness Monster, and Bigfoot. Throughout his life, he owned three separate, small-scale museums that featured displays, mostly photographs, of alleged UFO, Nessie, and Bigfoot sightings. He made guest appearances on national radio and television shows, but was criticized by skeptics and fellow cryptozoologists alike for not providing substantive evidence to back up his claims of the existence of paranormal beings.

== Personal life ==
Born Cedric Jon Beckjord in Duluth, Minnesota, he was the son of Col. Philip Beckjord, a World War II army physician, and Margaret (née McGilvry) Beckjord. He had three siblings: Ross, Peter, and Pam. His family came from Oslo, Norway.

== Education ==
Beckjord attended the United States Air Force Academy in Colorado Springs, Colorado for two years.

He studied sociology at Tulane University, where he graduated with a Bachelor of Science degree in 1961.

He studied law for one year at Boalt Hall at University of California, Berkeley. He later graduated with an MBA from U.C. Berkeley in 1966.

== Career ==
After graduation, Beckjord became a city planner in the Bay area, but wearied of a traditional job and decided to hunt for Bigfoot instead. "I don't do what most MBAs do," he said, "Most people in my class are bored to death or dead. The object in life is not simply to make money." Rather, he believed his most important task was to "find out why we're here (on Earth)"

Beckjord collected photographs, castings, and other memorabilia that, to him, represented evidence of the existence of UFOs and alien life, the Loch Ness Monster, as well as Bigfoot. He appeared on several nationwide radio and television shows, including Coast to Coast AM, The Tonight Show, and Late Night with David Letterman. In reference to his explorations, Beckjord compared himself to Galileo, Louis Pasteur, and the Wright brothers.

In 1983, Beckjord, then director of the Crypto Zoological Society, spent a week in Scotland videotaping what he believed were three monsters in Loch Ness.

In February, 1989, Beckjord opened the Crypto-Zoology Museum, housed in the corner of Trancas Restaurant in Malibu, California. The museum had its start on October 31, 1986, when he opened his home to visitors to see his collection. The display primarily consisted of photographs from Beckjord's research into the phenomena of the Loch Ness Monster, Bigfoot, and the Mokele M'Bembe of Africa. According to Beckjord, the museum focused on "creatures of fact or fancy" that "to the best of our knowledge appear to be verified, or haven't at least been debunked."

When Trancas Restaurant went out of business, Beckjord put the museum's contents in storage. Most of it was lost to fire in 1993.

On October 31, 1996, Halloween, Beckjord opened the Bigfoot, UFO and Loch Ness Monster Museum in San Francisco, California, which featured crop circles. He charged a nominal entrance fee ($3 for adults; $2 for children), but the museum's closing, reportedly, was "due to lack of any substantial evidence."

After this museum closed, Beckjord repaired electrical appliances for a company called Captain Neon.

In 1997, Beckjord opened a third museum in North Beach, California, which he called the Bigfoot and Loch Ness Monster Museum. It was billed as the city's "strangest museum" and consisted of photographs, drawings, and articles devoted to such topics as the Roswell Declaration, Bigfoot, and a sea serpent named "Sassie" which, allegedly, lived in the San Francisco Bay.

== Cryptozoology ==
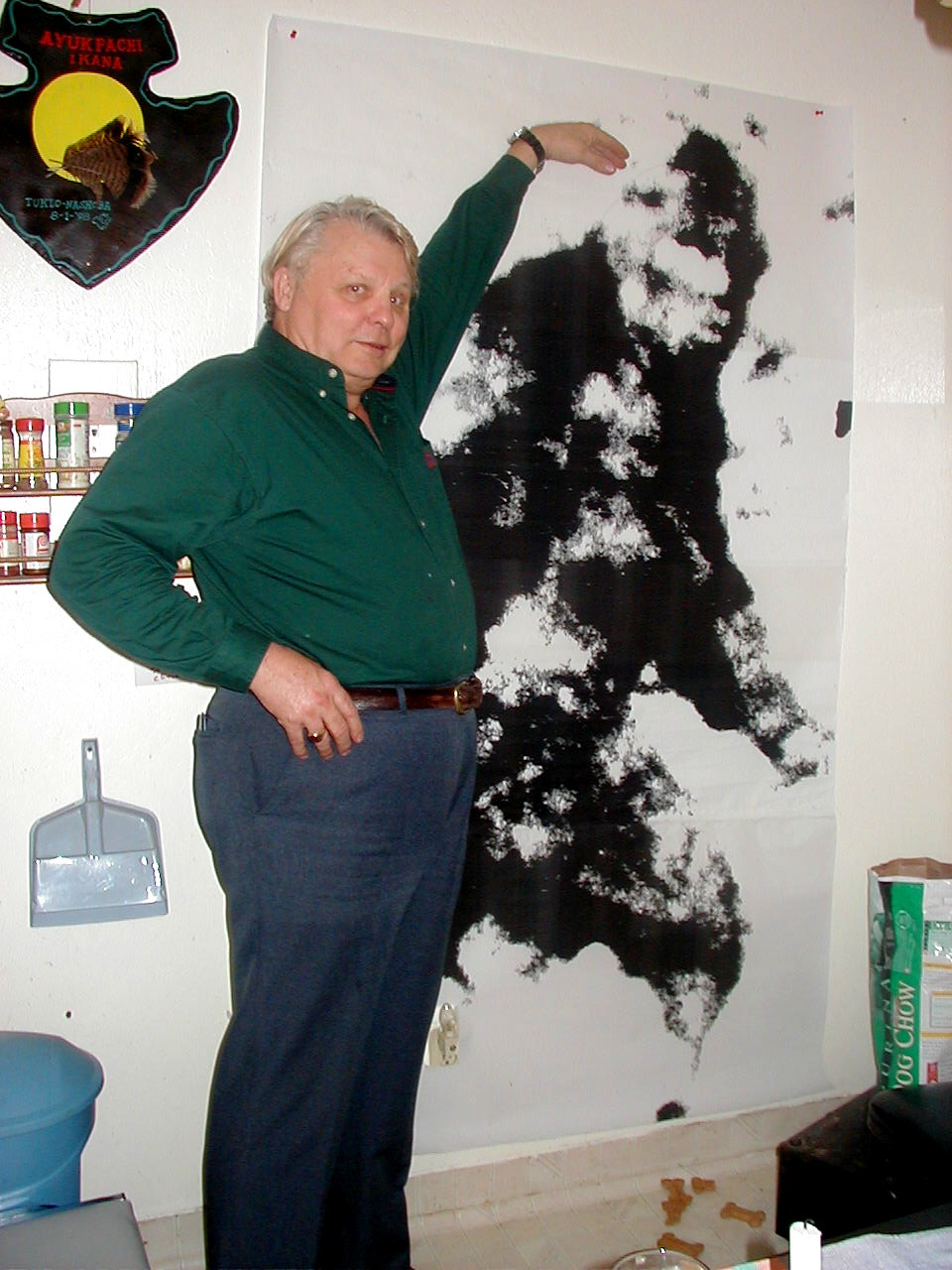
Jon-Erik Beckjord stands with a poster he made to demonstrate Bigfoot's size.

Beckjord defined cryptozoology as "the search for mysterious creatures." His searches included hidden "animals"—those that could, theoretically, exist in nature—and hidden "critters" or those that looked like animals, but resisted capture: the Loch Ness Monster, Sasquatch, and Quixacotal Big Bird.

=== Bigfoot or Sasquatch ===
Beckjord became intrigued with the idea of Bigfoot after seeing an article in the newspaper about alleged sightings of the creature. On an expedition to find evidence, he claimed he saw a Bigfoot cross the road in front of him from about 200 feet away. Beckjord was convinced of its existence, even as he failed to photograph Bigfoot. He also purportedly saw Bigfoot standing 6 feet tall and walking in a "loose, limbo-dance style", and, at another time, eating apricots in an orchard around Vacaville, California. He frequented a camp with other researchers, an alleged "window site" in the Bear River Reservoir area of Eldorado National Forest where he asserted that "evidence of Bigfoot is almost routinely seen." While he insisted that the exact location not be revealed to the public, Beckjord did agree to take skeptic Robert Sheaffer on a five-day expedition there in 1999. It was only after Sheaffer left the site, having seen nothing unusual, that Beckjord reported manifestations of Bigfoot.

Beckjord said he heard Bigfoot's voice telling him "We're not what you think we are, we're here, but we're not real, like what you think is real." Along with the photographs of leaves and shadows Beckjord believed showed images of Bigfoot, he also reported having seen Bigfoot footprints that turned into deer tracks, confirming for him that the creature had the ability to shift its shape. He theorized that Bigfoot creatures share a "space-time origin and connection with UFOs and come from an alternative universe by a wormhole."

Beckjord explained away the need for physical evidence, such as hair, blood and bones, to prove the existence of Bigfoot by arguing that the creature is an "inter-dimensional shape-shifter that can warp in and out of physical reality." He theorized that they may be "the product of tulpas or thought forms created by people or other entities." In an editorial for the journal Current Anthropology, Beckjord argued that the study of the "wild man", Sasquatch, was "the proper study of either parapsychologists or Search for Extraterrestrial Intelligence scientists, not anthropologists."

=== Loch Ness Monster ===
To Beckjord, the Loch Ness monster (Nessie) was a space alien pet left on Earth in a form of energy that could interact with human beings. He described Nessie as a cat-like faced creature, 15–30 feet long, 7–10 feet thick with a body that "looks like a cross between Halley's Comet and the Concorde jet." He claimed to have videotaped three, which he named Faith, Hope and Charity, on a visit to Drumnadrochit, Scotland in 1983. Beckjord admitted that the images might not be "exactly and positively" Nessie, but asserted that "90 percent of the people who have viewed the films believe the images are alive."

=== Loveland Frog ===
Beckjord speculated that the Loveland Frog might be the extinct 10-ft.-long bipedal dinosaur, Coelophysis.

=== Ri ===
In response to a Roy Wagner article, published in the ISC annual journal Cryptozoology (and later reprinted in Fate Magazine, August 1983), Beckjord traveled to Papua New Guinea to search for ri, or mermaids. Wagner's article described eyewitness accounts and sometimes daily sightings of "an air-breathing mammal, with the trunk, genitalia, and arms and head of a human being, and a legless lower trunk terminating in a pair of lateral fins or flippers." After his own investigation and determining that the locals were killing, butchering and eating dugongs—and not mermaids--, Beckjord concluded that no unknown animal was being seen in that area.

== UFOlogy ==
Beckjord believed in space alien visitations to Earth, crop circles and creative forces that sculpted rock, lava and sand on Mars to resemble people on Earth like Ted Kennedy, Tammy Faye Bakker and others. He tried to sell his Kennedy-on-Mars photos, which Beckjord discovered while analyzing NASA satellite photos of the planet, to raise money to investigate crop circles in England.

Beckjord took images of what he described as three "blobs-of-light" UFOs and witnessed two instances of unexplained light over Malibu and Sepulveda Pass, respectively. Beckjord believed in a government cover up of the existence of UFOs and extraterrestrial intelligence and advocated making that information available to the general public.

"A lot of this weirdness is right under our noses. We may belong to aliens. We may be experimental animals. But I can't prove it."

== Criticism ==
Beckjord's firm belief that Bigfoot and similar entities were inter-dimensional shape-shifters who could "manipulate the light spectrum so that people can't see them" brought him into conflict not only with skeptics, but other Bigfoot researchers as well, who argued for proof of physical remains. He had what is described as "well-publicized arguments" with writers of the Skeptical Inquirer and certain members of the International Society of Cryptozoology and was considered "a person non grata among more conventional Bigfoot researchers." He would, literally, fight for his beliefs with his fists and was banned from contributing to online forums because of postings that were allegedly abusive.

Robert Sheaffer, a founding member of the Committee for Scientific Investigation of Claims of the Paranormal, asserted that Beckjord "doesn't have one bit of proof. To allay Beckjord's proclamations that "all skeptics were too timid and closed-minded to actually go out into the woods and confront the Bigfoot evidence for themselves," Sheaffer accompanied Beckjord on a 5-day Bigfoot expedition in 1999. He was disappointed at Beckjord's continued lack of evidence and attributed Beckjord's interpretations of rock formations, leaves and shadows as Bigfoot faces or skulls to "the workings of an overzealous imagination."

CNN correspondent Rusty Dornin wrote in 1997 "Faces on Mars, the Loch Ness monster, or an alien with a name tag (Andy)--if it's far-fetched and unproved, Beckjord buys it. And it's all on display at his storefront 'museum'."

Beckjord maintained that "With the card-carrying skeptics, we will never win. There are more people who have seen UFOs than voted for President Clinton."

== Death ==
After battling prostate cancer, Beckjord died at the age of 69 on June 22, 2008, near his home in Lafayette, California, where he was a caretaker for the Crosses of Lafayette, a monument to casualties of the Iraq War before his death.

== Memberships ==
- Crypto Zoological Society
- Mensa
- National Cryptozoological Society
- Project Bigfoot

== Awards ==
- Esquire Magazine's 1991 'Dubious Achievement Award' for "the discovery of a volcanic formation on Mars that resembles Senator Edward Kennedy."
