= Camp Casey =

Camp Casey can refer to:

- Camp Casey, South Korea, a U.S. Army base in South Korea
- Camp Casey, Crawford, Texas, an encampment outside the George W. Bush ranch in Crawford, Texas during his five-week vacation there in August 2005
- Camp Casey, any of several Union Army training camps named for Major General Silas Casey including where "colored" troops trained
