= Hearts in San Francisco =

Hearts in San Francisco is an annual public art installation started in 2004 by the San Francisco General Hospital Foundation for the purpose of fundraising. The project is inspired by the international CowParade exhibit, in which cow sculptures are painted by various artists and installed in various cities throughout the world. The choice of hearts is inspired by the Tony Bennett song "I Left My Heart in San Francisco."

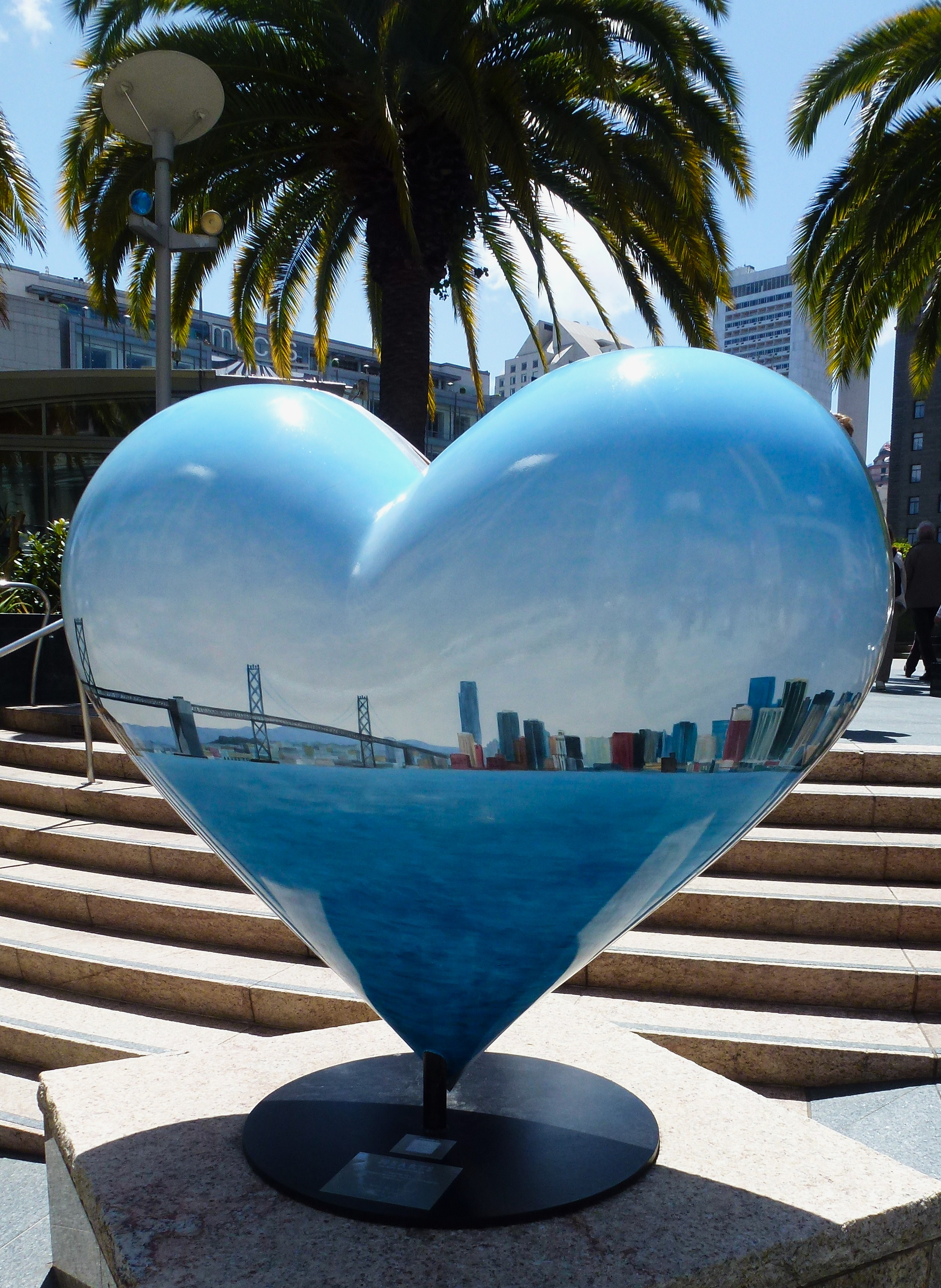
Heart sculpture at Union Square in San Francisco

== Background ==
Each year, uniform heart sculptures are painted by different artists and installed at locations throughout San Francisco, including Union Square. The heart sculptures are auctioned off at the end of each year's installation with the proceeds going to the foundation. Artists are chosen for the Hearts in San Francisco project through an annual open application process managed by the San Francisco General Hospital Foundation. The Hearts Sculpture Committee, composed of foundation staff, board members, and art experts, selects artists to design and create the iconic, one-of-a-kind heart sculptures. Artists submit applications with design renderings and are limited to four unique heart designs per application. Selected artists receive honorariums to help cover supply costs: $2,500 for large heart sculptures, $1,000 for tabletop hearts, and $500 for mini hearts, though artists may choose to donate this back to the Foundation.

Many of the previous years' sculptures are exhibited in various locations, including San Francisco City Hall, San Francisco General Hospital, San Francisco International Airport, AT&T Park (inside the Public House pub), Pier 39, the Lyon Street Steps, Moscone Center, and the Cartoon Art Museum.

Notable contributing artists have included Mark Adams, Don Asmussen, Tony Bennett, Squeak Carnwath, Alan Chin, Roy De Forest, Linda Fleming, Phil Frank, Tim Gaskin, Mildred Howard, Norman Korpi, Jon Langford, Hung Liu, Kara Maria, Silvia Poloto, Stan Dann, Precita Eyes Muralists, Rex Ray, Rigo 23, Bill Russell, Monika Steiner, Laurel True, and Eric Zener.

== Annual Gala ==
The annual Hearts in San Francisco gala, which features the auction of that year's heart sculptures, has been held since 2004 and serves as a major fundraising event for the San Francisco General Hospital.

=== Fundraising Impact ===
Since its launch, the Hearts in San Francisco program has grown into a significant fundraising initiative for San Francisco General Hospital. In its initial year in 2004, 131 heart sculptures measuring approximately five feet high and six feet wide were displayed throughout San Francisco and auctioned, raising nearly $3 million. The 2019 gala marked the program's fifteenth anniversary and raised a then-record $5.5 million for the newly established Transform Mental and Behavioral Health Fund, along with a major million-dollar donations from Bank of America and Kaiser Permanente. For the 20th anniversary in 2024, 28 new hearts were created, including eight large hearts, eleven special-edition tabletop hearts, and nine mini hearts.

As of 2024, about 500 hearts of different sizes have been made and have raised almost $38 million for Zuckerberg San Francisco General Hospital.

=== Recognition and Awards ===
The 2026 gala introduced the Hero & Heart Awards, recognizing healthcare workers from San Francisco General Hospital, and the Community Impact Award, presented to Dr. Patricia Hellman Gibbs and Dr. Richard D. Gibbs, founders of the San Francisco Free Clinic. The Community Impact Award honors partners who have demonstrated a commitment to serving San Francisco's most vulnerable populations through accessible healthcare. For over 20 years, the San Francisco Free Clinic has provided free medical care to uninsured and underserved residents, representing a model of equity and compassion that aligns with the mission of San Francisco General Hospital.

=== Program Leadership ===
The Hearts in San Francisco gala was co-founded by Pam Baer and Judy Guggenhime and the heart sculpture program was co-founded by Nancy Bechtle and Ellen Magnin Newman.
