= Lafayette Library and Learning Center =

Library in California

Coordinates: 37.892215°N 122.116097°W

The Lafayette Library and Learning Center (LLLC) is a library and learning center in Lafayette, California that opened in 2009. The Lafayette Library and Learning Center is also home to the Glenn Seaborg Learning Consortium, a partnership with the region’s leading arts, culture, and educational institutions. The Center includes classrooms which host programs from local learning institutions. It is a part of the Contra Costa County Library system.

The Glenn Seaborg Learning Consortium, named after chemist Glenn Seaborg, aims to provide materials, archives, workshops, exhibits, K-12 curricula, lectures, films, and discovery centers from many local institutions such as the UC System, Lawrence Hall of Science, Oakland Museum of California, Chabot Space and Science Center, Commonwealth Club of California, Oakland Zoo in Knowland Park, John Muir Health, Lindsay Wildlife Museum, California Shakespeare Theater, Greenbelt Alliance, John F. Kennedy University, St. Mary’s College, and the UC Institute of Governmental Studies.

The mission statement says that the center aims to be a cultural and learning center throughout the community, expanding upon the usual role of a library.

== History ==
The Lafayette Library and Learning Center was first proposed to the City of Lafayette at the end of 2003. The city voted to support the Library in January 2004. In 2004 the membership of the Glenn Seaborg Learning Consortium was finalized and funding was pursued. In November 2004 the project was awarded $11.9M by the State of California. In 2004–2005 City officials brokered a deal with the local veterans to build a new Veterans Memorial Building at the west end of Lafayette and to take over the former Veterans Memorial Building in the downtown area for use by the new Library. The new Veterans Memorial Building was completed late in 2005. Meanwhile, community donations were raised which matched the State grant of $11.9M. Construction bids were gathered and the ground breaking for the new Library occurred on April 20, 2007. During this period Seaborg Consortium programming began using the existing library space and the new Lafayette Veterans Memorial Building.

On November 14, 2009, the doors of the Lafayette Library and Learning Center opened for the first time. Since that day in November, the LLLC has hosted over 400 programs annually. Topics ranged from Story Times, to the life of a bug, to the historic 2008 Presidential campaign as related by New York Times bestselling author Mark Halperin.

Nearly 1,500 visitors pass through the front doors of the Library every day – a 300% increase from daily attendance at the old library.
