= Cameron Tuttle =

American author

Cameron Tuttle is an American author. Tuttle attended Acalanes High School in Lafayette, California and Brown University. She then began her career as a writer for an advertising agency before writing her first book, "The Paranoid's Pocket Guide," which landed her on Oprah. Inspired by the movie Thelma and Louise, Tuttle went on the lam in 1996, doing research for what would become the "Bad Girl's Guide to the Open Road."

She is also the author of the Paisley Hanover series (Penguin Books) for young adults.

== Bibliography ==
- The Bad Girl's Guide to the Open Road; Cameron Tuttle, illustrator: Susannah Bettag, 1999.
- The Bad Girl's Guide to Getting What You Want; Cameron Tuttle, illustrator: Susannah Bettag, 2000.
- The Bad Girl's Guide to the Party Life; Cameron Tuttle, illustrator: Susannah Bettag, 2002.
- The Bad Girl's Little Pink Book; Cameron Tuttle, illustrator: Susannah Bettag, 2002.
- Bad Girl's Guide to Getting Personal; Cameron Tuttle, illustrator: 2004.
- The Bad Girl's Rate-Your-Date Journal: Your Guide to Playing the Field - and Keeping Score! Cameron Tuttle, illustrator: Susannah Bettag, 2004.
- "The Paranoid's Pocket Guide"; Cameron Tuttle, 1997.
- "Paisley Hanover Acts Out"; Cameron Tuttle, illustrator: Ali Arnold, 2009.
- "Paisley Hanover Kisses and Tells"; Cameron Tuttle, illustrator: Ali Arnold, 2010.
