= Acalanes High School =

Location
- 1200 Pleasant Hill Road; Lafayette, California 94549; United States; 37°54′17″N 122°05′54″W

Information
- School type: Public high school
- Established: 1940
- School district: Acalanes Union High School District
- NCES School ID: 060165000032
- Principal: Eric Shawn
- Teaching staff: 63.19 (FTE)
- Grades: 9-12
- Enrollment: 1,250 (2023–2024)
- Student to teacher ratio: 19.78
- Colors: Royal blue and white
- Athletics conference: California Interscholastic Federation, North Coast Section; Diablo Foothill Athletic League
- Nickname: Dons
- Newspaper: Blueprint
- Yearbook: AKLAN
- Website: School website

Acalanes High School is a public secondary school located in Lafayette, California, United States, in the San Francisco Bay Area, within Contra Costa County. Acalanes was the first of four high schools established in the Acalanes Union High School District. It was built in 1940 on what was then a tomato field, using federal government funds with labor provided by the Works Project Administration, the largest and most ambitious New Deal agency introduced by the Roosevelt administration. Lafayette businessman M.H. Stanley suggested the name "Acalanes", the name of Rancho Acalanes, the Mexican grant from which all land title within the City of Lafayette derives. Rancho Acalanes itself seems to have been named by its Hispanic settlers after the local Native American Bay Miwok tribe called Saklan (Saclan), referred to by Spanish missionaries as Saclanes. The first graduating class of 1941 selected the school colors of blue and white. For the school sports mascot, they chose the Don (a Spanish honorary title).

== Academics ==
Acalanes offers a diverse course selection and a number of AP and honors courses. Among the electives offered are sports medicine, digital design, auto mechanics, studio arts from beginning to AP, video production, journalism, drama, photography, Mandarin (Chinese), Spanish, French, chorus, band (four groups), and orchestra.

Acalanes High won the regional competition of the National Science Bowl at Lawrence Berkeley National Laboratory.

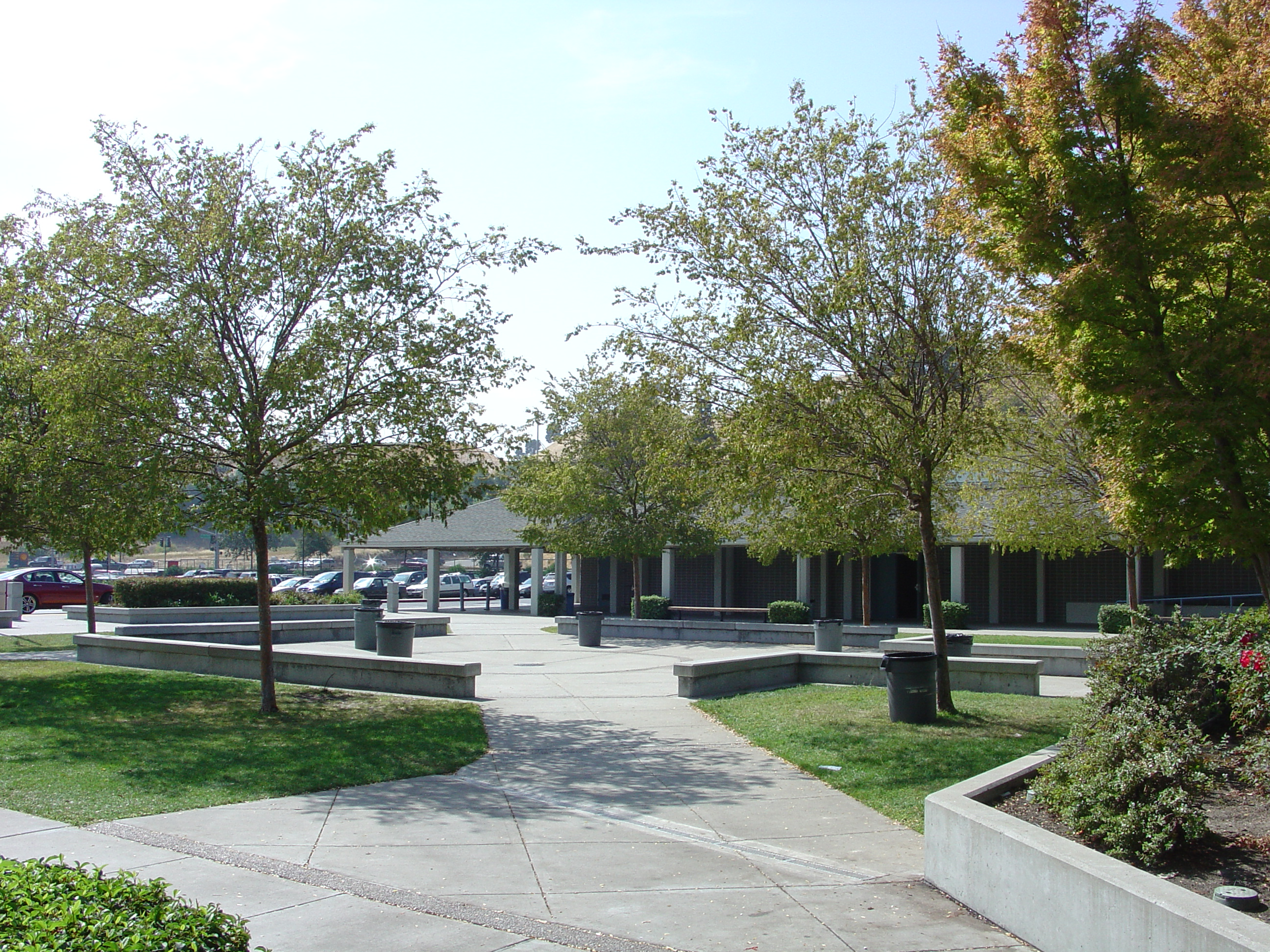
The front quad

== Facilities ==
In 1939, Acalanes was the first school designed by Ernest Kump and became the prototype for what came to be called the "California School", consisting of a complex of rectangular single-story modern buildings in parallel rows separated by gardens, with no hallways. Its openness to the outdoors and ease of expansion were revolutionary at the time, and the format was widely copied.

The campus includes a track, several fields (an astroturf field, a grass field, and a baseball field), a pool, tennis courts, two gyms, weight room, two quads, and a performing arts center. Measure E bonds passed in 2008 provided for the complete renovation of the aquatic facilities, which was completed in the summer of 2011.

== Notable alumni ==
- Espen Baardsen - professional soccer goalkeeper
- Nicki Bluhm - musician
- Alan Chin - artist
- Philip M. Condit - former chairman and CEO of the Boeing Company
- Donna de Varona - Olympian
- Gloria Duffy - former U.S. Deputy Assistant Secretary of Defense and Special Coordinator for Cooperative Threat Reduction
- Scott Dyleski - convicted of murdering his neighbor, Pamela Vitale, the wife of attorney Daniel Horowitz
- Craig Federighi - Sr. Vice President of Software Engineering at Apple
- Don Ferrarese- Former MLB player (Baltimore Orioles, Cleveland Indians, Chicago White Sox, Philadelphia Phillies, St. Louis Cardinals)
- Will Forte - cast member of Saturday Night Live
- Justin Fox (born 1964) - financial journalist, commentator, and writer
- George Prifold Harrison - gold medalist at the 1960 Olympic Games
- Peter Hayes and Robert Levon Been - members of the rock band Black Rebel Motorcycle Club
- Hans-Peter Martin - member of the European Parliament, foreign exchange student
- Joe Millette - former MLB player (Philadelphia Phillies)
- George Lewis Mount - member of the 1976 US Olympic cycling team
- Ann Nelson - American particle physicist
- Nelson Piquet - Brazilian driver, three-time winner of Formula One World Drivers' Championship
- Jewel Roemer - USA Water Polo Women's Senior National Team player
- Dave Stanton - motorcycle racer, former AFM, WERA National Endurance, AMA Pro, and Formula USA champion
- Bret Taylor - chairman of OpenAI, former co-CEO of Salesforce, former chairman of Twitter, Inc.
- Cameron Tuttle - bestselling author of the Bad Girl's Guide series
- Ross Valory - bassist for the rock band Journey
- Norm Van Brocklin - former NFL quarterback
- Evan Wallach - judge of the United States Court of Appeals for the Federal Circuit
- Kathryn Werdegar - California Supreme Court Justice
