= Oakmont Memorial Park =

Cemetery in Contra Costa County, California

Coordinates: 37°56′53″N 122°06′09″W

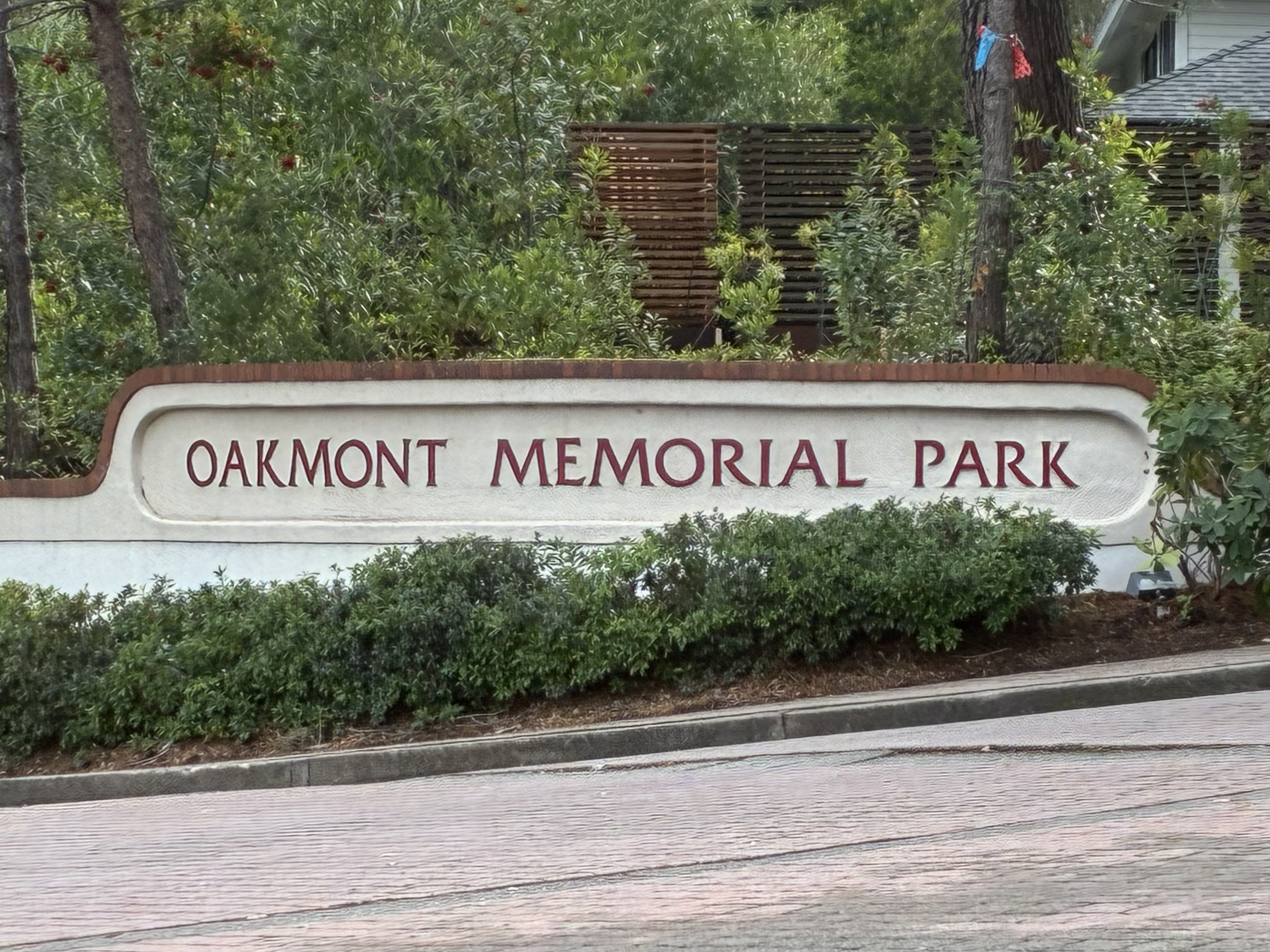
- Interactive map of Oakmont Memorial Park

Details
- Established: 1956
- Location: 2099 Reliez Valley Rd, Lafayette, California, United States
- Type: Private
- Size: 67 acres
- Website: Oakmont Memorial Park Website
- Find a Grave: Oakmont Memorial Park

Oakmont Memorial Park is a cemetery, crematorium and funeral home in Lafayette, California, United States.

== Notable interments ==
- John F. Baldwin Jr. (1915–1966), US Congressman
- Brent Mydland (1952–1990), musician, keyboardist for the Grateful Dead
- Eric Lynch aka Eric the Actor (1975–2014), actor, member of Howard Stern's Wack Pack
- Leonard Michaels (1933–2003), American writer of short stories, novels, and essays

== See also ==
- List of cemeteries in California
