= Lamorinda =

Area within Contra Costa County, California, U.S.

Coordinates: 37.8920°N 122.1544°W

Lamorinda is an area within Contra Costa County, California in the United States. The name is a portmanteau derived from the three cities that make up the region: Lafayette, Moraga and Orinda.

Lamorinda is located east of the Berkeley Hills, between the Caldecott Tunnel and Walnut Creek. It is often referred to as the "Highway 24" corridor, referring to the state highway that is the primary thoroughfare in the region. Many residents commute west through the tunnel to San Francisco and Oakland or east to Walnut Creek and Concord.

As of 2010, the three cities had a combined population of 57,552, with Lafayette having the largest population and Moraga the smallest.

== Differences among the three cities ==
Each city in Lamorinda is distinct, but they share many similarities, such as suburban bedroom communities with limited industry. The region has been described as "wealthy" by the San Francisco Chronicle. The public high schools in each of the cities are part of the Acalanes Union High School District, one of the highest-ranked high school districts in California.

With a cluster of restaurants and generally high-end shops in its downtown, Lafayette is considered the retail hub of the region. Orinda is home to the historic Orinda Theatre and the California Shakespeare Theater. Moraga is home to Saint Mary's College of California.

=== Transportation ===
Lafayette and Orinda are located along Highway 24, with the Bay Area Rapid Transit (BART) Yellow Line running in the highway medians and stations at both Lafayette and Orinda. Line 6 of the Contra Costa County Connection runs through the three cities. Moraga, located to the south, is more isolated with only a pair of two-lane roads connecting it to Orinda and Lafayette as well as to Highway 24 to the north. Additionally, internal roads link Moraga to downtown Walnut Creek, while another set of two-lane roads connects it to Oakland hills and Castro Valley.

== Central county ==
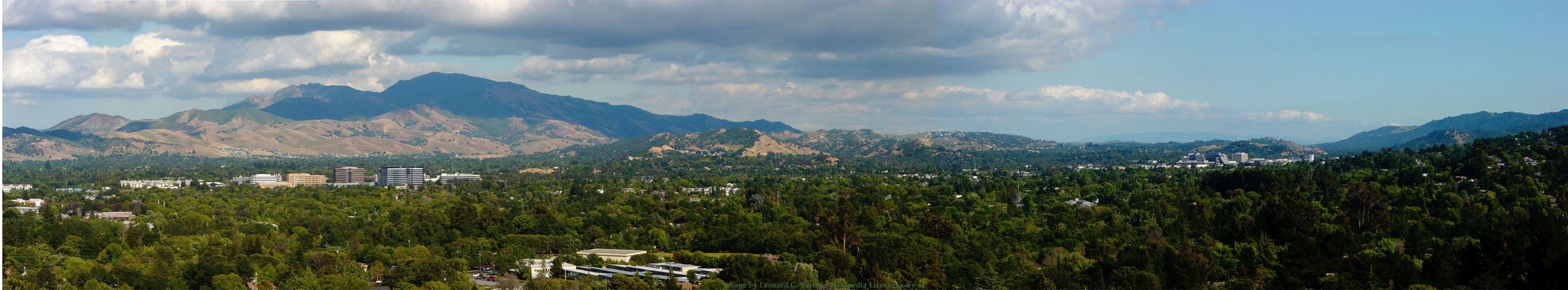
Central county scene — Mount Diablo and portions of Concord, Pleasant Hill, and Walnut Creek, with former grasslands now an urban forest in low density suburbs with extensive business centers and residential buildings near BART locations (at the tall building groups). A recent (2007-8) development near the BART stations is the creation of luxury apartments selling for a price equivalent to a well-maintained large-lot suburban house.>

Lamorinda is located in the western part of Contra Costa County, California. The central part of the county is a valley traversed by Interstate 680 and Highway 24. The towns to the east of the hills, situated on or near Highway 24 and their surrounding areas (Lafayette, Moraga and Orinda) are collectively known as Lamorinda. The major central county cities along Interstate 680 include Martinez, Concord, Pleasant Hill, Walnut Creek, Danville, San Ramon, and unincorporated Alamo.
