= Camp Casey, Crawford, Texas =

2005 anti–Iraq War protest in Texas

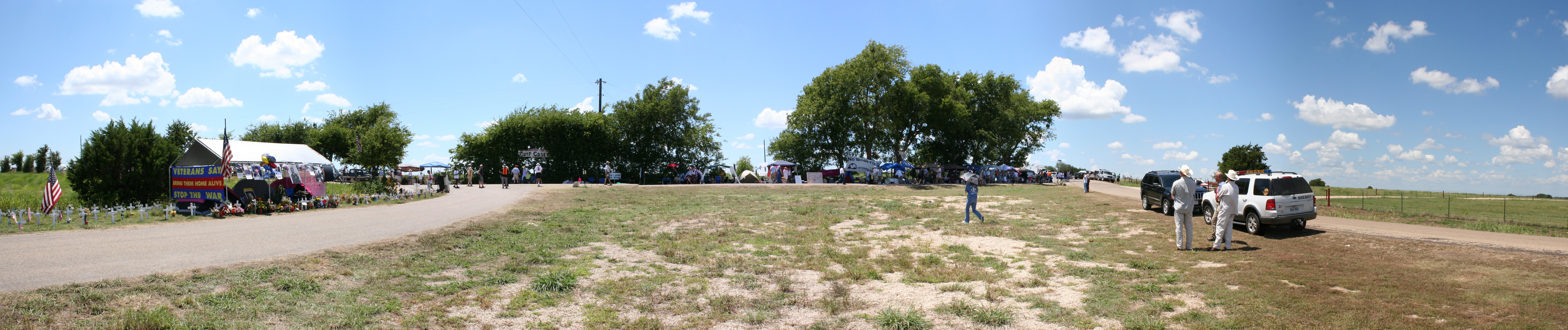
A panoramic photograph of Camp Casey on August 18, 2005

Camp Casey was the name given to the encampment of anti-war protesters outside the Prairie Chapel Ranch in Crawford, Texas, during U.S. President George W. Bush's five-week summer vacation there in 2005, named after Iraq War casualty U.S. Army Specialist Casey Sheehan.

Arriving on a bus that departed the Veterans for Peace National Convention, Cindy Sheehan walked with the support of Camilo Mejía and other veterans who helped Cindy gain passage when multiple officers of the law attempted to persuade her from advancing beyond the Crawford Texas Peace House Sheehan failed to get a second meeting with President Bush for an explanation of the cause for which her son, Casey, died. Having been turned away, she pitched a tent by the side of the road and announced her intention to stay, day and night, for the full five weeks or until such a meeting is granted. She also promised that, if she were not granted a second meeting, she would return to Crawford each time Bush visited.

Other members of Gold Star Families for Peace and other anti–Iraq War activists joined them, camped in public land, such as ditches by the road.

A local property owner provided them with a place to camp, which became known as "Camp Casey II."

Two weeks after the establishment of "Camp Casey," counter-protestors established their own camp nearby.

== Administration response ==
There had been reports that the police had threatened to arrest all protesters on site on Thursday, August 11, 2005, when Secretary of Defense Donald Rumsfeld and Secretary of State Condoleezza Rice would be at the president's nearby ranch. However, no arrests in connection with the protest were made. President George W. Bush did speak to reporters at his ranch, saying:

I sympathize with Mrs. Sheehan. She feels strongly about her position, and she has every right in the world to say what she believes. This is America. She has a right to her position, and I thought long and hard about her position. I've heard her position from others, which is: 'Get out of Iraq now.' And it would be a mistake for the security of this country and the ability to lay the foundations for peace in the long run if we were to do so.

Prior to going on a bicycle ride on his Texas ranch on August 13, 2005, Bush gave journalists and aides a defense of his not meeting with Sheehan stating, as reported by Ken Herman of Cox Enterprises:

I think it's important for me to be thoughtful and sensitive to those who have got something to say. But I think it's also important for me to go on with my life, to keep a balanced life ... I think the people want the president to be in a position to make good, crisp decisions and to stay healthy. And part of my being is to be outside exercising. So I'm mindful of what goes on around me. On the other hand, I'm also mindful that I've got a life to live and will do so.

Sheehan later issued a statement, which among other things outlined the purpose of the protest.

== Beyond Sheehan ==
When Sheehan had to go to Los Angeles on August 18, after her 74-year-old mother suffered a stroke, she said she would be back when she could and that she would follow Bush to Washington at the end of his vacation. "Camp Casey" remained active in her absence, with over 150 protesters sleeping in tents or cars, and hundreds more participating sporadically. During this time, Bush flew to another state to continue his vacation with a fishing trip. Less than two days later (still during the scheduled vacation), he and his administration began a new public relations campaign to rally support for the war in Iraq. The campaign was primarily set in Idaho and Utah.

== Support ==
During Sheehan's vigil, a number of organizations and individuals expressed and provided support to the activists at "Camp Casey." One of these was the national organization Veterans for Peace, at whose convention Sheehan spoke just prior to beginning her vigil in Crawford. Members of the organization like Desert storm Veteran Dennis Kyne assisted in the initiation of the "Camp Casey" site. Others were installing and maintaining the Arlington West display there.

The website MoveOn.org announced on August 10, 2005, that it was gathering comments via email to place in a two-page newspaper spread in a Sunday edition of the Waco Tribune newspaper in support of Sheehan and her efforts. MoveOn gathered more than 250,000 comments, many of which were included in the advertisement. Tom Matzzie of MoveOn said:

In her grief and bravery, Cindy has become a symbol for millions of Americans who demand better answers about the Iraq war. Though right-wing pundits have attacked her personally, her honesty is unimpeachable. Now more and more mothers (and fathers, brothers, sisters, wives, husbands, sons and daughters) are standing up with Cindy. Please join us, and together, we'll make sure that President Bush can't escape the reality of this war—even in Crawford, Texas.

Supporters pointed out that the Crawford protest highlighted the Bush administration's belief in selective violence and the claim that the President failed to take responsibility for the deaths of those he commanded.

On the week of August 8, 2005, several other groups were reported traveling to Texas to join the protest. Sherry Bohlen, field director of the Progressive Democrats of America (PDA), was one person traveling to Crawford, and said of the protest:

We'll be sleeping in a tent in the ditch along the roadside (the only place that the authorities will allow us to be). I spoke with Cindy by phone again yesterday. She said that local authorities have told her that if we're still there by Thursday we'll be arrested as "national security risks"... She could well be the Rosa Parks of the movement against the Iraq War. Just as Rosa refused to leave the bus, Cindy is refusing to leave the roadside. She's the spark that is igniting the anti-war movement.

On August 9, 2005, Sheehan began writing a blog concerning (among other things) her experience at Camp Casey, her thoughts on the Iraq War, and her response to right-wing criticism of her. It was featured on several websites, including The Huffington Post and Daily Kos

She spoke at the laissez-faire Ludwig von Mises Institute, whose founder and president, the free-market capitalist Lew Rockwell, regularly features Sheehan's columns on his website.

== Parents of other troops killed in Iraq ==
On August 17, 2005, Jane and Jim Bright, parents of slain Army Sgt. Evan Ashcroft, attended a vigil in support of Sheehan, saying "their son's memory would not be lost in the anti-war movement." They also said their son, like Sheehan's son, "was a hero who died for what he believed in." Jim Bright also said, "People are looking inside themselves and saying, is this war worth it?".

Celeste Zappala, mother of slain Sgt. Sherwood Baker, the first Pennsylvania National Guardsman to die in Iraq, arrived at Camp Casey on August 9 and met with Sheehan. Zappala would become a co-founder of Gold Star Families for Peace, acting as a voice for many of their campaigns and pledging to continue the protest at Camp Casey after Sheehan chose to leave.

Minnesota State Senator Becky Lourey, a vocal critic of the Iraq War and mother of fallen Army helicopter pilot Matthew Lourey, traveled to Crawford to protest Bush's refusal to meet with Sheehan. "There is an isolation here of President Bush from the people," said Lourey. "(and)it seems to me as I am looking around that it is wrong, that a person who makes life and death decisions is insulated from the people who suffer the consequences of those decisions". She also traveled to Crawford to grieve and support her fellow military parent, stating that she wanted to "put her arms around" Sheehan and offer her support.

Lynn Bradach, mother of Marine Cpl. Travis Bradach-Nall, who died from a land mine explosion in Iraq during the summer of 2004, travelled from Portland, Oregon to Crawford to join Sheehan in her vigil. "'I don't want to be a center of anything,' said Bradach. 'But when you strongly believe something, at some point you have to stand up for it."

Karen Meredith, whose son, Army Lt. Ken Ballard, was killed in Iraq in May 2004, defended Sheehan, saying, "Some people are trying to paint her as one crazy woman against the war, and she's not. A lot of people feel like her and want to know what the noble cause is."

Linda Ryan, mother of Corporal Marc T. Ryan, a Marine who was killed in Ramadi, says of Sheehan: "She's going about this not realizing how many people she's hurting. When she refers to anyone killed in Iraq, she's referring to my son. She doesn't have anything to say about what happened to my son."

On August 15, 2005, Matt and Toni Matula, parents of Matthew Matula, a Texas Marine killed in Iraq, requested that the white cross representing their dead son as a victim of the war in Iraq be removed, stating that they did not wish their son's name to be part of an anti-war demonstration. Mr. Matula said, "It's fine for people to grieve their own way. It aggravates me to see them using other people's names to further their cause."

Natalie Healy, mother of Dan Healy, a Navy SEAL who was killed in the line of duty in Afghanistan, organized a rally on August 20, 2005, in Portsmouth, New Hampshire, to counteract Sheehan's message, stating: "We just want to let the fellas know that we're supporting them and that we're not going to wimp out on them."

Gary Qualls whose son, Marine Corporal Louis Wayne Qualls died in Iraq, started what was dubbed "Fort Qualls" in Crawford, Texas, to counter the "Camp Casey" protests. Qualls stated that he had to keep taking down the white cross bearing his son's name from the Arlington West display set up by "Camp Casey."

== Other camps ==
That summer the "Camp Casey phenomenon" spread across America and camps were set up in hundreds of places to show sympathy for the Sheehan family. According to Cindy Sheehan, the first one erected was in Chico, California. These camps were sometimes called "peace camps" or named after a local who had died fighting overseas.

== Chronology ==
=== Week 1 ===
- August 6, 2005: Cindy Sheehan started her demonstration. She makes a makeshift camp in a ditch by the side of the road about 3 miles from George W. Bush's Prairie Chapel Ranch near Crawford, Texas and announces her intention to stay (sleeping in a pup tent at nights) until she is granted another face-to-face meeting with the President.
- August 6, 2005: National security adviser Stephen Hadley and deputy White House chief of staff Joe Hagin meet briefly with Cindy Sheehan. Sheehan later called the meeting "pointless."
- August 8, 2005: Cindy Sheehan states that she has been informed that beginning Thursday, August 10, 2005, she and her companions will be considered a threat to national security and will be arrested. Later there was a retraction of the story by the Daily Kos. Sheehan's camp is first referred to in the media as "Camp Casey."
- August 9, 2005: Democratic congressmen request that Bush meet with Sheehan and the other relatives of fallen soldiers. The congressmen call on Bush to ensure that no one will be arrested for having a peaceful demonstration.
- August 10, 2005: Bush holds a press conference, during which he mentions Sheehan's right to her view.
- August 11, 2005: Cindy Sheehan writes an open letter to President Bush in response to his press conference statement. In this open letter, she demands to know the "noble cause" behind the war in Iraq, as well as the reason why, if the cause is so noble, Bush's daughters are not volunteering in the war effort.
- August 12, 2005: Gold Star Families for Peace releases a TV commercial featuring Cindy Sheehan, broadcast on Crawford and Waco cable channels near Bush's ranch.
- August 12, 2005: Camp Casey protest draws hundreds of supporters (including actor Viggo Mortensen), with a constant presence of just over 100.
- August 12, 2005: Southern California members of Veterans for Peace install Arlington West, a memorial consisting of nearly 1,000 white crosses (as well as stars and crescents), each bearing the name of a fallen U.S. soldier in Iraq, along the side of the road near Sheehan's camp.
- August 12, 2005: Bush's motorcade passes within 100 feet of Sheehan's roadside encampment en route to a nearby ranch to attend a fundraising barbecue expected to raise US$2 million for the Republican National Committee; Sheehan holds a sign reading "Why do you make time for donors and not for me?"
- August 12, 2005: Patrick Sheehan files for divorce from Cindy Sheehan in a California court. Mr. Sheehan was the father of Casey Sheehan.

=== Week 2 ===
- August 13, 2005: A morning counter protest is reported to bring over 250 people, who shout pro-Bush slogans for several hours. Sherry Bohlen, National Field Director for PDA, estimates that 1000 to 1500 people gathered at a park in Crawford for a peace demonstration, and that 500 cars ferried these people to Camp Casey. (Source: Email from Bohlen to PDA members)
- August 14, 2005: Larry Mattlage, who owns a cattle ranch across where Sheehan has set up her protest site, fed up with traffic near his home, fires a shotgun several times into the air. He later claims to have been practicing for dove hunting season but also hints to reporters that the shots may also have been meant to drive off the protesters.
- August 14, 2005: U.S. Representative Maxine Waters, as well as a group of Iraqis living in Texas, visit Sheehan at Camp Casey.
- August 15, 2005: Late in the night, a pickup truck driven by Waco, Texas resident Larry Northern tears through the rows of white crosses stretching about two-tenths of a mile along the side of the road at the Crawford camp, each bearing the name of a U.S. soldier killed in Iraq. Several hundred of the crosses are damaged but no one is injured. Northern is later arrested and charged with criminal mischief by police.
- August 16, 2005: Sheehan announces plans to move her camp closer to the Bush ranch after being offered the use of a piece of land owned by a supporter, Fred Mattlage, a third cousin of Larry Mattlage, the rancher who had fired a shotgun on his property near the demonstration site several days earlier.
- August 16, 2005: Move America Forward announces a "You Don't Speak For Me, Cindy" caravan ending in Crawford, on August 27.
- August 17, 2005: More than 1,600 anti-war candlelight vigils in support of Sheehan are held around the United States, including one outside the White House.
- August 18, 2005: Sheehan announces she is leaving Crawford to see her elderly mother, who had suffered a stroke, but vows to return if possible and as soon as she can.
- August 18, 2005: A walk is made by the Gold Star Mothers for Peace towards President Bush's ranch in Crawford to deliver letters written by them to First Lady Laura Bush, appealing to her as a mother for support towards their movement.

=== Week 3 ===
- August 20, 2005: President George W. Bush embarks on a five-day campaign to defend the Iraq war, speaking to veterans' and military groups in Utah and Idaho.
- August 20, 2005: Supporters of the Iraq war, led by Crawford small business owner Bill Johnson, set up a small opposing camp, named "Fort Qualls," behind his "Yellow Rose" gift shop in Crawford, Texas.
- August 20, 2005: Texas singer-songwriter James McMurtry and country musician Steve Earle perform at Camp Casey II, followed by speeches by Rev. Peter Johnson, organizer and former staffer of the Southern Christian Leadership Conference, and Rev. Joseph Lowery, preacher and co-founder of the SCLC. They introduce three African American mothers whose sons were killed in Iraq.
- August 21, 2005: Folk singer Joan Baez visits and performs at Camp Casey.
- August 21, 2005: Bomb threat received at the "Yellow Rose" gift shop, owned by pro-Bush Crawford businessman Bill Johnson.
- August 22, 2005: Motorcycle rider clubs roll by in support of the pro-Bush camp.( minutes 24–25)
- August 22, 2005: U.S. Representative Sheila Jackson Lee (D-Texas) and actress Margot Kidder visit Camp Casey.
- August 22, 2005: The Pro-Bush "You Don't Speak for Me, Cindy" caravan, sponsored by the Sacramento-based group Move America Forward, leaves from San Francisco for Crawford, Texas.
- August 22, 2005: Opponents of Sheehan set up "Camp Reality," located in a ditch across the road from Camp Casey.
- August 23, 2005: In brief remarks to reporters in Donnelly, Idaho, President George W. Bush states his opposition to Sheehan's call for an immediate withdrawal of U.S. troops from Iraq.
- August 24, 2005: President George W. Bush addresses military families in Nampa, Idaho and explains his reasons for being in Iraq: "We will stay on the offense. We'll complete our work in Afghanistan and Iraq. An immediate withdrawal of our troops in Iraq, or the broader Middle East, as some have called for, would only embolden the terrorists and create a staging ground to launch more attacks against America and free nations. So long as I'm the President, we will stay, we will fight, and we will win the war on terror... We're spreading the hope of freedom across the broader Middle East."
- August 25, 2005: Sheehan states that she will continue her campaign against the Iraq war even if granted a second meeting with the President, and announces plans to lead a national bus tour to Washington, D.C., which will leave on September 1 and arrive in Washington on September 24 for three days of action against the war.

=== Week 4 ===
- August 27, 2005: Conflicting estimates of between 1000 and 4000 Pro-Bush supporters rally in Crawford as part of the "You Don't Speak for Me, Cindy" caravan.
- August 27, 2005: Native American activist Russell Means visits Camp Casey II.
- August 28, 2005: Actor and long-time peace activist Martin Sheen, who plays fictional Democratic President Josiah Bartlet on The West Wing, visits and speaks.
- August 28, 2005: Rev. Al Sharpton visits Camp Casey II.
- August 29, 2005: Hurricane Katrina, a Category 4 storm, makes landfall in southeastern Louisiana.
- August 29, 2005: Native American activist Dennis Banks visits Camp Casey II.
- August 30, 2005: President Bush decides to end his five-week vacation early to focus on relief efforts in the wake of Hurricane Katrina.

== See also ==
- American popular opinion of invasion of Iraq
- Capitol Hill Autonomous Zone
- Support and opposition for the 2003 invasion of Iraq
- Popular opposition to war on Iraq
- Protests against the 2003 Iraq war
- Post–September 11 anti-war movement
- Movement to impeach George W. Bush
