= Elam Brown =

California settler and politician (b. 1797, d. 1889)

The Honorable Elam Brown
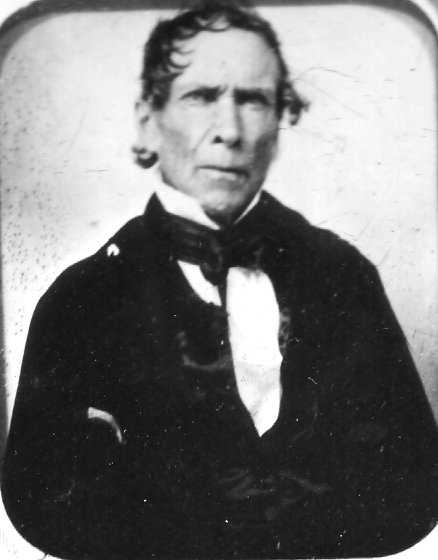
- Born: June 10th 1797; Herkimer, New York
- Died: August 10, 1889; Lafayette, Contra Costa, California
- Occupations: Politician, Rancher, Pioneer, Soldier
- Known for: Aiding in the settlement of California and its creation as a U.S State, founding the City of Lafayette
- Title: Alcalde, Constitutional Delegate, Legislative Assemblyman, Justice of the Peace
- Political party: Whig
- Spouse: Sarah Allen (married 9 Jan 1823)
- Children: 1 Daughter and 3 Sons
- Parent(s): Maj. Thomas Brown and Elizabeth Lynde

Elam Brown (June 10, 1797 - August 10, 1889) was an early pioneer, settler, and politician in California, founding the City of Lafayette, and serving as an Alcalde, Representative for the District of San Jose at the California Constitutional Convention, and as an assemblyman in the state legislature.

== Before California ==
Elam Brown was born on June 10, 1797, in Herkimer, New York, to parents Major Thomas Brown and Elizabeth "Betsy" Lynde, farmers. Thomas was a pioneer in his own right, bringing his family into the wilderness of Ohio, where they were some of the first settlers in what is today Delaware County, Thomas building the first brick house in the township of Berkshire, briefly serving as Major of the county's Militia, and later in the War of 1812 as a Sergeant. Elam moved with his parents first to Berkshire, Massachusetts as an infant, and then to the frontier of Ohio in 1804 at the age of six. From childhood, Elam displayed a love for learning, becoming interested in literature, history, and geography. His father, Thomas, died in 1815, leaving control of the estate in Elam's hands until 1818. Thereafter, now aged 21, Elam set out on a 500-mile journey, by foot, to the French trading post of St. Louis, from there rafting the Missouri River, before settling to farm in Illinois for about 4 years. It was during this time he met his first wife, Sarah Allen. Gradually farming further North, Elam helped to organize an area of wilderness into Morgan County, where he would spend most of the next 14 years (barring seasonal stints in lead mines of Wisconsin), serving for 12 years as Justice of the Peace. In the Fall of 1836, he moved again to the banks of the Missouri River, clearing himself a large farm and helping to organize Platte County. His wife, Sarah, died in 1843, and in 1846, he resolved to move West to the Pacific Coast.

== The Journey to California ==
Gathering a party of 14 pioneer families in Platte County, of which he was appointed Captain, Elam set out from St. Joseph on May 1, 1846, with 16 wagons, which grew to a train of 30 wagons with the convergence of other parties on the plains. Both great adversities and great amazements occurred along the journey. A stampede resulted in the loss of 120 cattle and oxen, causing a weeks delay. Near Fort Laramie, the party encountered a group of about 300 mounted Sioux warriors, apparently headed North to attack the Crows. Elam approached and hailed the great war-band, meeting with their Chief. The warriors briefly followed the party, Brown being informed by a French trader that they expected compensation in the form of a feast for the Pioneers having hunted out much of the local game on their journey. The feast was held the next morning a short distance from the camp, Elam speaking positively with the Chief and his men through an interpreter, before the warband disappeared beyond the river that afternoon. Passing through the Black Hills, they reached Independence Rock, forded rivers and climbed mountains to arrive at Fort Bridger. By this point, many members of the party had become gravely ill, including Elam's own son, Warren Brown, who was left behind at the fort. The party continued wearily along the Snake River, turning South into Humboldt, Nevada, where several of the party were buried, succumbing to "plains fever", likely caused from drinking the oxen and cattle's milk.

== In California ==
Their spirits lifted as they travelled up the Truckee River, finding themselves before the Sierras, as Winter drew near. With great effort, they drew their wagons through the mountains one by one, making it through the difficult pass just a few days before the ill-fated Donner Party, who had previously travelled with Brown's party in the plains before splitting up. Elam and his party entered California on October 10, 1846, arriving at Johnson's Ranch before camping in the area of present-day Sacramento. From Sutter's Fort, he made arrangements to travel to Santa Clara, participating in the defense of the American families in the area in the wake of the Mexican-American War. Elam Brown spent the Summer of 1847 whip-sawing San Antonio redwood lumber, ferrying it across the Bay to San Francisco.

== Rancho Acalanes and Politics ==
In the Fall, Elam Brown heard tell of a ranch for sale by William Leidesdorff, the Rancho Acalanes, which would later develop into the City of Lafayette, under his direction. Purchasing the Rancho along with 300 cattle, Elam built a large corral, and redwood-framed house, beginning to develop the land. During this time, Elam built first a horse-drawn grist mill, and then a steam-powered mill, causing a commercial center of trade and business to coalesce at the Rancho, with a blacksmith, bar, general store, and lodgings. Elam also began to parcel out the land to other settlers, including 372 acres to Nathaniel Jones, the first Sheriff of Contra Costa County, who later married one of Brown's step-daughters. The community that would become Lafayette was initially called Brown's Corner or Brown's Mill. In 1849, Elam Brown was elected to the Constitutional Convention of Monterey. As one of the 37 members of the convention, Brown helped to codify the State Constitution, and organize the new State of California's government and structure. He served in the first two State Legislatures, turning down offers to run for Senate in 1852 in favor of life on his Rancho. Before dying in 1889, aged 92, In 1882, he was biographed and interviewed by J.P Munro-Fraser, stating among other things;

Amid all the various surroundings and positions through life I have never struck or been struck; never run for or from man or boy. I have had but few lawsuits or contentions. I have never bet a cent on a race or cards, and never dealt in stocks. I was never intoxicated by liquor, although I was raised in a tavern; but I have never dealt in the article since. I have never cheated a man, knowingly, out of a dollar; but the reverse has occasionally occurred. I do not intend this as a boast, but as an acknowledgment of the blessing bestowed on me through a long life by my good and benevolent Creator. I was inquired of by kind friends in San Jose why I settled in that lonesome place; why I did not settle there in that pleasant valley among white people? The question was urgently asked by good neighbors in Missouri, when I was about to start across the plains. Again, back in Illinois, when about to leave a pleasant home for the wilds of the Platte Purchase. Again, back in Ohio, in 1846, when I went back to the place of my youthful days. I had four sisters, with families there. There, too, in the grave-yards, the white tombstones marked the resting place of father, mother and brother. There, too, with all those near and dear associations, I was urgently and earnestly entreated, as I had sold my farm in Missouri, to come and spend the remainder of my life with old friends and associates. All did not change me from my destined Western course. Again, in the most emphatic manner, was the question asked on that dreary night in the streets of Santa Clara. The answer, why, I have never found, and I believe the answer has not and never will be solved. I freely acknowledge my incapacity to solve it.

== Family and Descendants ==
Brown married twice, first to Sarah Allen, and secondly to Margaret B. Miller, a fellow widow and member of his pioneer party.

With Sarah, he had a daughter and three sons;

Margeline Brown (April 12, 1829 - March 12, 1893): Margeline was the mother of the first American child born in Contra Costa County. Her husband was Napoleon B. Smith (1818–1907) a pioneer, gold miner, first surveyor of Contra Costa County, and member of the Bear Flag Revolt, capturing Sonoma and declaring California's brief independence. He served in the Legislature at Vallejo in 1852, thereafter buying a 400-acre ranch in Alhambra Valley, where he grew fruit. Margeline and Napoleon had 8 children together.

Thomas Allen Brown (October 15, 1823 - August 5, 1889): Thomas was a Superior Court Judge, going first to Oregon in 1843, where he operated a local newspaper press, coming to be with the rest of the family in California in 1849, serving as an Alcalde, County Clerk, supervisor, county judge, and member of the legislature. He had 3 sons with his wife Caroline Camron.

Warren J. Brown (June 19, 1826 - May 14, 1899): Warren, being left severely ill at Fort Bridger, eventually recovered, joining his family in California. He worked as a lumberjack and gold miner, before opening a general store in partnership with his brother Thomas, and brother-in-law Napoleon B. Smith. He was the County Surveyor in 1850, and Sheriff in 1869, he had 550 acres of land near his father in Lafayette. He had 2 sons with his wife Laura Hastings.

Lawrence Myers Brown (January 14, 1833 - August 1, 1877): Lawrence had 2 sons with his wife Mary Yager. He died aged 44.
