= Justin Fox =

American journalist (born 1964)

- Born: January 28, 1964 (age 62); Morristown, New Jersey, U.S.
- Education: Princeton University; University of Leiden; Harvard Kennedy School
- Occupations: Financial journalist, commentator, and writer
- Employer: Bloomberg

Justin Fox (born January 28, 1964) is an American financial journalist, commentator, and writer. He is a Bloomberg Opinion columnist, writing about business and economics. Formerly, he was editorial director of the Harvard Business Review Group for five years, and business and economics columnist for Time magazine. Fox's book, The Myth of the Rational Market (2009), traces the rise of the efficient-market hypothesis, and was a New York Times Notable Book of 2009, and was named the best business book of the year by Amazon.com.

== Early life and education ==
Fox was born in Morristown, New Jersey, a son of Joseph M. Fox and Elizabeth L. Fox. He grew up in Lafayette, California, attending Acalanes High School.

Fox graduated from Princeton University (BA, international affairs, '87), and was a Rotary International Fellow at the University of Leiden. He has been a Senior Fellow at the Mossavar-Rahmani Center for Business and Government at Harvard Kennedy School.

== Career ==
He became a Bloomberg Opinion columnist, writing about business and economics. Formerly, he was editorial director of the Harvard Business Review Group for five years, and business and economics columnist for Time magazine. He has been published by Fortune magazine, The Birmingham News, and American Banker.

He was awarded the 2001 Business Journalist of the Year Award for writing about technology.

Fox's book, The Myth of the Rational Market (2009), traces the rise of the efficient-market hypothesis. It was a New York Times Notable Book of 2009, and was named the best business book of the year by Amazon.com.

He has worked as a commentator on PBS's Nightly Business Report. He is a Young Global Leader of the World Economic Forum.

== Bibliography ==
=== Books ===
- Fox, Justin (2009). The Myth of the Rational Market: A History of Risk, Reward, and Delusion on Wall Street. Harper Business. ISBN 978-0-06-059899-0.

=== Articles ===
- Fox, Justin (April 23, 2009). "Hooray for Boring Banks". Time. Archived from the original on April 27, 2009.

== See also ==
- New Yorkers in journalism
