= Rancho Acalanes =

Mexican land grant in California

Coordinates: 37.900°N 122.120°W

Rancho Acalanes was a 3,329-acre (13.47 km^{2}) Mexican land grant in present-day Contra Costa County, California.

It was given in 1834 by Governor José Figueroa to Candelario Valencia. The name Acalanes seems to have come from Ahala-n, the name of a Costanoan native village in the area, or from the Saklan tribe, sometimes known as the Sacalanes The rancho included present-day Lafayette and northern Orinda.

== History ==
Candelario Valencia was the son of Jose Manuel Valencia, one of Anza's soldiers. Candelario had himself been a soldier in the San Francisco company from 1823 to 1833, where he continued to serve in minor official posts until 1846. Candelario Valencia was married to Paula Sánchez who was the sister of Francisco Sanchez and José de la Cruz Sánchez. Candalario's sister, Maria Manuela Valencia, received Rancho Boca de la Canada del Pinole, a grant located between Martinez and Lafayette in 1842.

Valencia was involved in a boundary dispute with his Rancho Laguna de los Palos Colorados neighbor to the south, Joaquin Moraga. The conflict was temporarily resolved in 1844 by Governor Micheltorena, who set the boundary line by decree, but the dispute was not finally resolved until there had been a survey in 1860, and a re-survey in 1875. Valencia lived on Rancho Acalanes, near present-day Lafayette, for five years. Valencia returned to his other property near Mission Dolores in San Francisco, complaining of harassment by Indians (his sister Maria Manuela's husband, Felipé Briones, was killed by Indians in 1839). Most records indicate that Valencia Street in San Francisco was named either for him or for the family. Valencia sold Rancho Acalanes to William Leidesdorff, who may never have seen the rancho before he resold it to Elam Brown in late 1847, complete with 300 head of cattle.

Brown sold 327 acres (1.3 km^{2}) (an undivided tenth) of the rancho to Nathaniel Jones, a native of Tennessee. Nathaniel Jones would become Contra Costa County's first sheriff. Brown and Jones took up residence in early 1848 and began the growing of barley and wheat in addition to raising cattle. Brown was soon chosen alcalde of his area, and was a delegate to the 1849 California Constitutional Convention in Monterey. Brown also became a representative to his district in the first and second sessions of the California State Assembly, but he withdrew from politics after 1852 to devote his time to his rancho.

As a member of the State Assembly and a ranch-owner, Brown - together with John Bidwell, Mariano Vallejo, and David Douglas - was responsible for writing the 1850 "Act for the Government and Protection of Indians," which allowed any white male, with a judge's approval, to take on Indigenous Californian children as "apprentices" or involuntary servants, ostensibly for the purpose of "civilizing" them; "like the other authors" of this Act, Brown "made extensive use of servile Indian laborers" at the Rancho Acalanes.

With the cession of California to the United States following the Mexican-American War, the 1848 Treaty of Guadalupe Hidalgo provided that the land grants would be honored. As required by the Land Act of 1851, a claim for Rancho Acalanes was filed with the Public Land Commission in 1852, and the grant was patented to Elam Brown in 1858 (patent No. 124).

== See also ==
- Ranchos of Contra Costa County, California
