= Lafayette station (BART) =

Rapid transit station in the San Francisco Bay Area

Lafayette
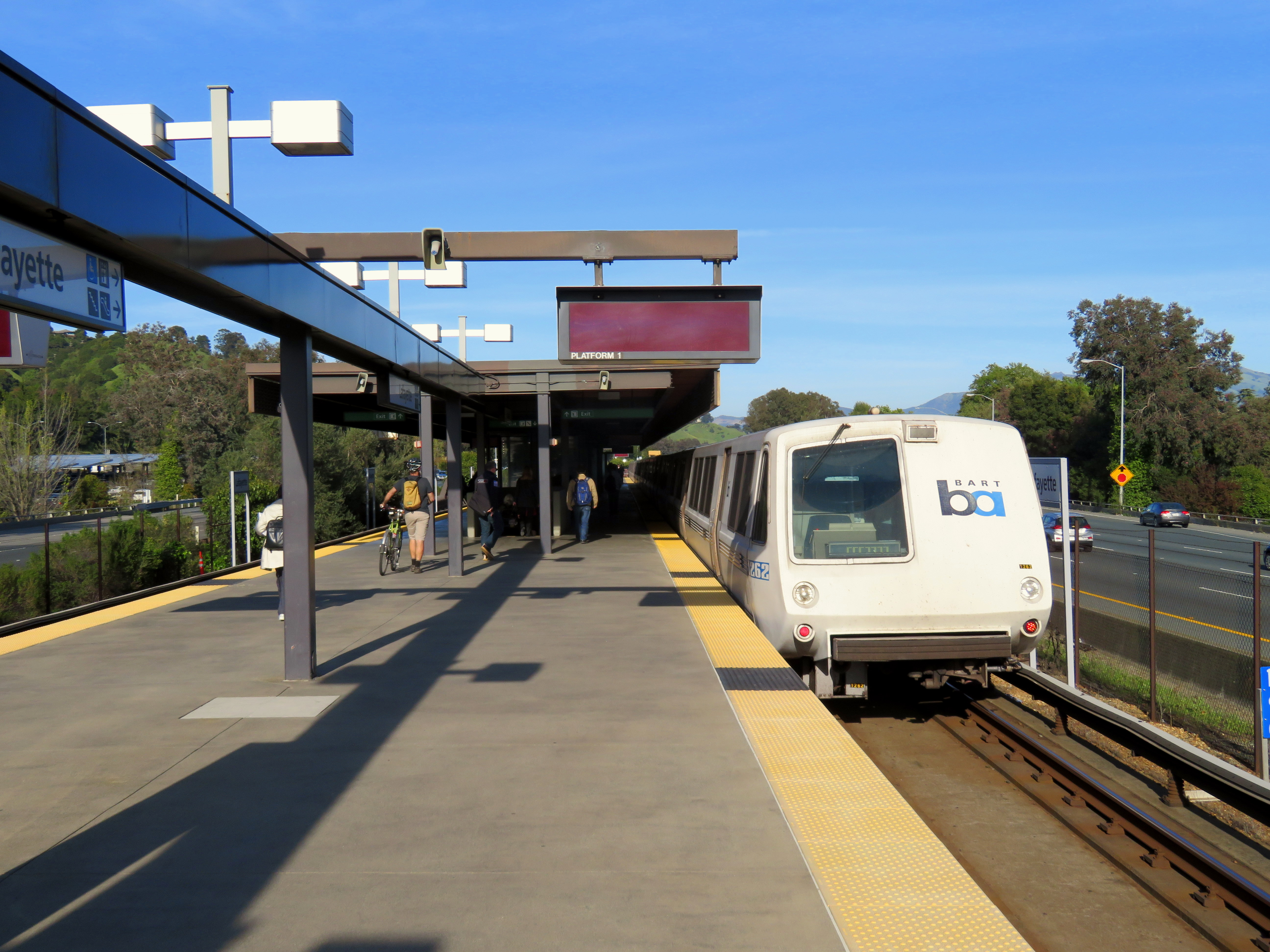
- An eastbound train at Lafayette station in 2018

General information
- Location: 3601 Deer Hill Road; Lafayette, California
- Coordinates: 37.893186°N 122.124614°W
- Line: BART C-Line
- Platforms: 1 island platform
- Tracks: 2
- Connections: County Connection: 6

Construction
- Structure type: Elevated
- Parking: 1,629 spaces
- Cycle facilities: 30 lockers
- Accessible: Yes
- Architect: Gwathmey, Sellier & Crosby; Joseph Esherick & Associates

Other information
- Station code: BART: LAFY

History
- Opened: May 21, 1973

Passengers
- 2025: 1,780 (weekday average)

Services
Preceding station	Bay Area Rapid Transit	Following station
Orinda toward SFO or Millbrae	Yellow Line	Walnut Creek toward Antioch via Pittsburg/Bay Point
Location

Lafayette station is a Bay Area Rapid Transit (BART) station in Lafayette, California. The station consists of one island platform in the center median of State Route 24 just south of the Lafayette Hillside Memorial. It is served by the Yellow Line.

== History ==
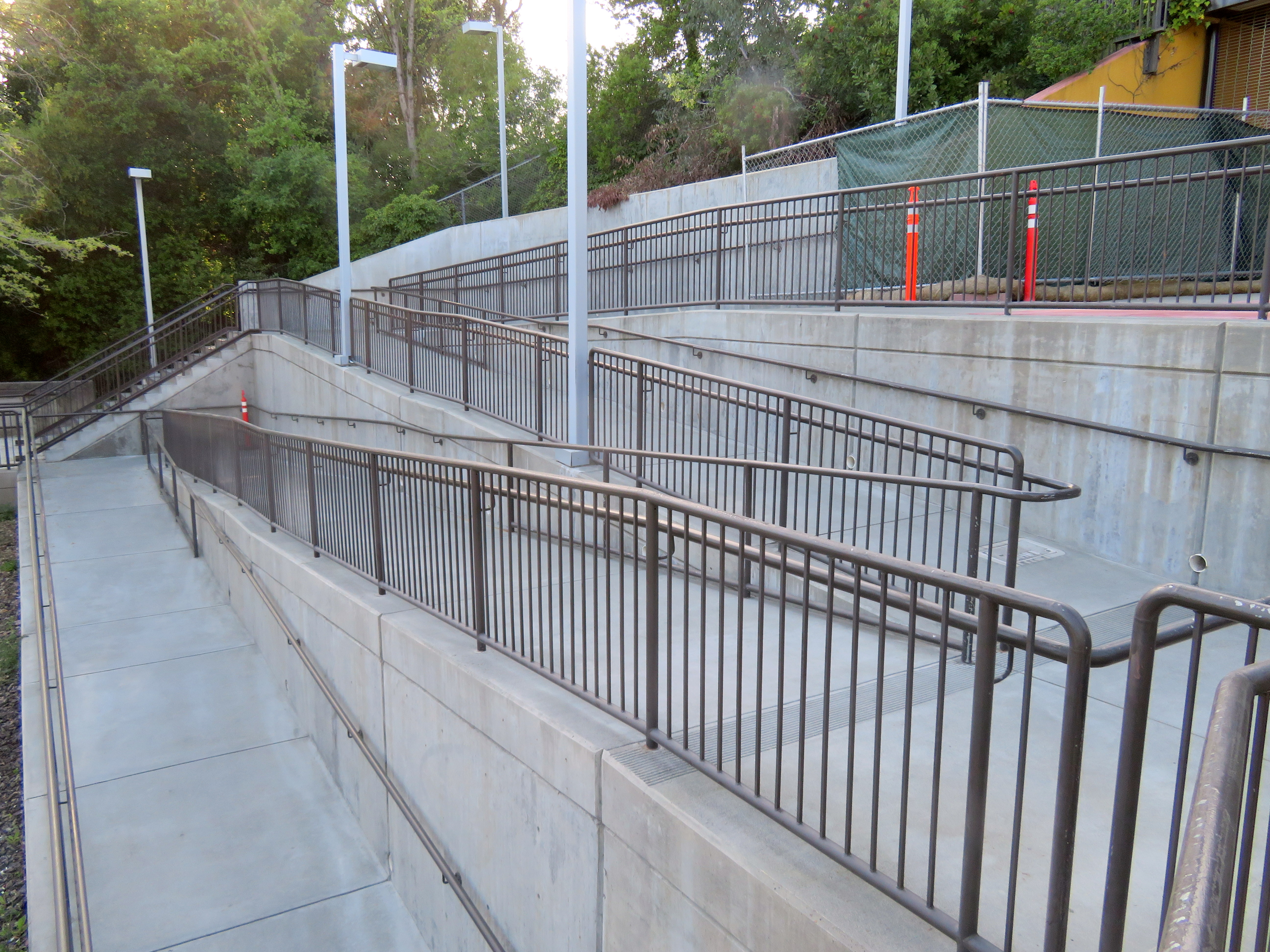
The ramp structure in 2018

The BART Board approved the name "Lafayette" in December 1965. Service at the station began on May 21, 1973. The fare lobby includes three columns covered in tile mosaics, which were designed by Helen Webber and constructed by Alfonso Pardiñas. Webber originally planned to use a purple background, but switched to blue due to local objections related to purple's association with the controversial People's Park.

AC Transit began operating local bus service under contract in central Contra Costa County in the 1970s after the coming of BART. Service funded by Moraga and Orinda, which also served Lafayette station, began on September 13, 1976. The service was transferred to County Connection on June 7, 1982.

In October 2011, BART was criticized for spending $2 million on a wheelchair ramp at the south entrance to the station without adding curb cuts or accessible parking there. However, the ramp was primarily built to connect to a path to the Lafayette business district to the south, and BART was already preparing to add curb cuts. The pathway was improved in 2018 as part of the construction of an adjacent condominium complex. Construction of a bike station and path connection at the station began in February 2026.

The station was not accessible from April to July 2021 due to replacement of the hydraulic cylinder in the platform elevator. As of 2024, BART anticipates soliciting a developer between 2029 and 2033 for transit-oriented development to replace surface parking lots at the station.
