= Lonnie Qualls =

American football and baseball coach

Biographical details
- Born: c. 1932

Playing career

Football
- 1951–1954: Ozarks

Basketball
- ?–1955: Ozarks

Baseball
- ?–1955: Ozarks
- Position: Fullback

Coaching career (HC unless noted)

Football
- c. 1960: Clarksville HS (AR)
- 1962–1965: Ozarks

Head coaching record
- Overall: 2–29–2 (football)

Lonnie R. Qualls (born c. 1932) is an American former football and baseball coach. He served as the head football coach at the College of the Ozarks—now known as the University of the Ozarks—in Clarksville, Arkansas from 1962 to 1965, compiling a record of 2–29–2. He was the final head football coach at Ozarks as the program was discontinued after the 1965 season.

A native of Clarksville, Qualls graduated from Clarksville High School, where he competed football, basketball, baseball, and track. He then attended the College of the Ozarks, where he played football, basketball, and baseball. Qualls played football as a fullback, rushing for 2,106 yards and scoring 182 points in his career at the school. He earned first-team all-Arkansas Intercollegiate Conference (AIC) honors in each of his four seasons and won the AIC's Back of the Year award as a senior in 1954.

Qualls began his coaching career at Clarksville High School before returning to the College of the Ozarks, where he taught and coached a number of sports—baseball, tennis, bowling, soccer, and cross country in addition to football. The baseball field at Ozarks was named in honor of Qualls in 2005.

== Head coaching record ==
=== College football ===
Year	Team	Overall	Conference	Standing	Bowl/playoffs
Ozarks Mountaineers (Arkansas Intercollegiate Conference) (1962–1965)
1962	Ozarks	1–7	0–7	8th	
1963	Ozarks	1–6–2	1–6	7th	
1964	Ozarks	0–8	0–7	8th	
1965	Ozarks	0–8	0–7	8th	
Ozarks:		2–29–2	1–27		
Total:		2–29–2			
