= Arlington West =

Project for public attention to Iraq

Coordinates: 34.41144°N 119.68930°W

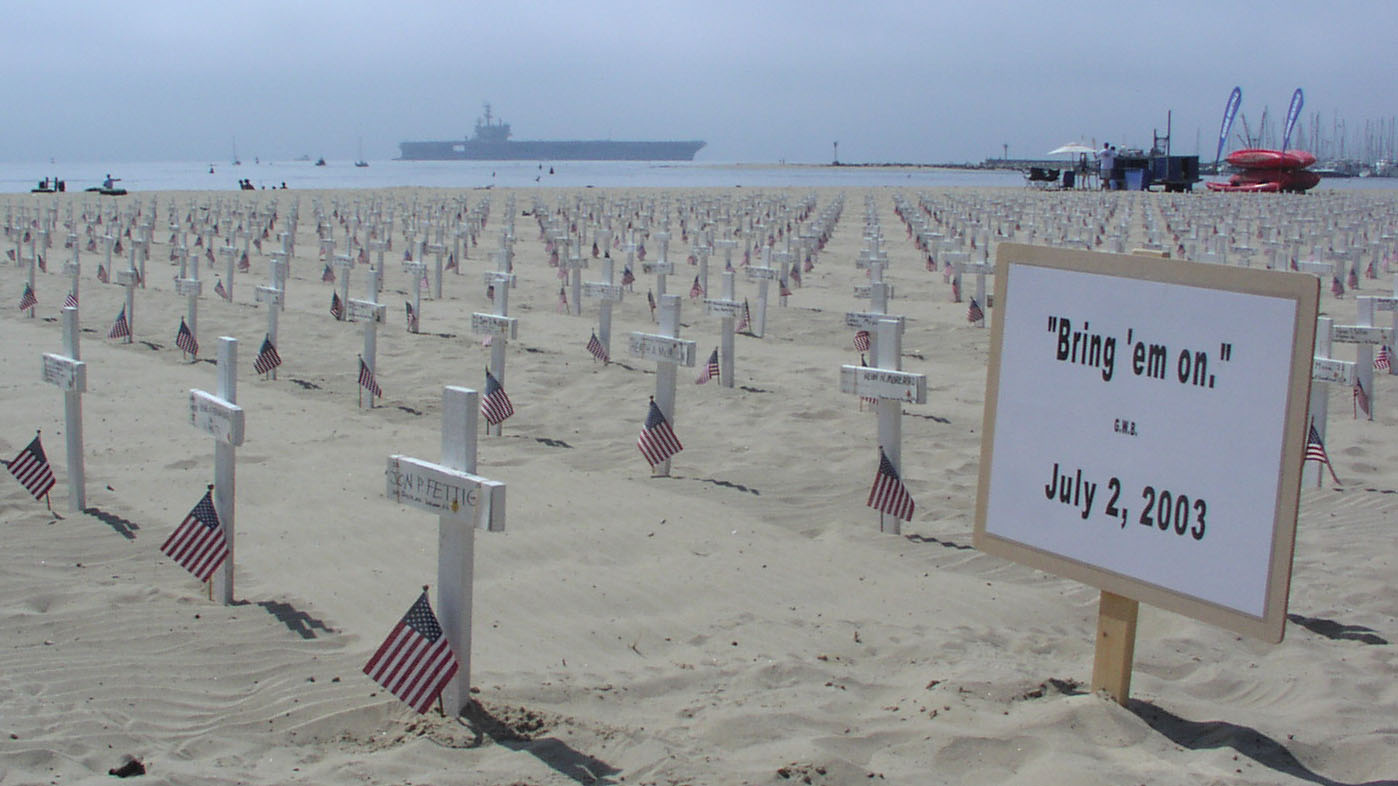
The original Arlington West memorial, Santa Barbara, California

Arlington West is a series of projects in coastal California intended to draw public attention to, and to open a discourse on the subject of both military and civilian deaths during the invasion and occupation of Iraq in the early 21st century. The projects, consisting of symbolic grave markers established at beaches, have been implemented at beaches in Santa Barbara, Santa Monica, San Diego, and elsewhere. There is also a similar, but differently named Lafayette Hillside Memorial in the San Francisco Bay Area.

== Memorial ==
Arlington West refers to the "temporary cemetery" itself, as well as Veterans for Peace's project of installing the temporary memorial. The name, Arlington West, was given to the memorial by WWII Veteran, Ensign Theodore Berlin of PT 167, and reflects the name of the national cemetery of the United States, Arlington National Cemetery, a burial place of honor for fallen war heroes. Arlington National Cemetery is the location of the Tomb of the Unknown Soldier, and is also the final resting place for John F. Kennedy. Arlington West—in a manner similar to "real" cemeteries—is intended by the project organizers to be a place to mourn, reflect, contemplate, grieve, and meditate, to honor and acknowledge those who have lost their lives, and to reflect upon the costs of war.

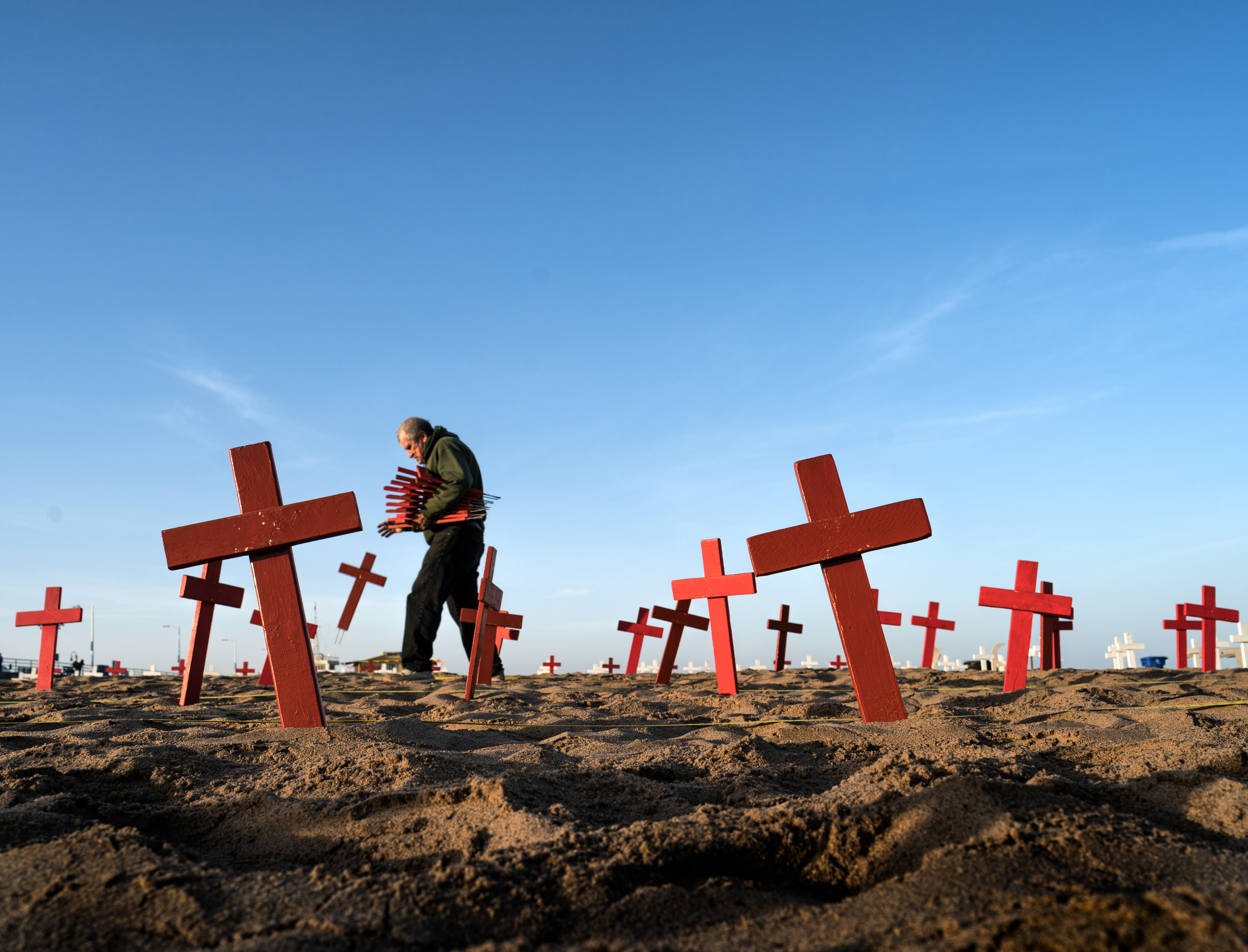
A Vietnam War veteran placing crosses at Arlington West in Santa Monica

The memorial in Santa Barbara, which was first put together on November 2, 2003 by local activist Stephen Sherrill, was soon adopted by the local chapter of Veterans for Peace. It is installed each Sunday by a team of volunteers on the beach immediately west of Stearns Wharf. Visitors walking to the tourist attractions on the wharf have a clear view, from the boardwalk, along the beach with the white crosses in the foreground. From the walkway, visitors can see a flag-draped coffin and more than 3,000 crosses, made of wood, which are intended to resemble and represent traditional military grave markers. In addition to the simulated graveyard, a placard listing all the fallen American military personnel since the U.S. invaded and occupied Iraq is prominently displayed; this list is updated weekly. Due to logistical constraints, the number of new crosses was halted at just over 3000 even though the latest death toll has exceeded 4400. Adjacent to the placards is a sign containing the message: "At 3000 crosses, the Arlington West Memorial is 141 feet wide and 310 feet long. A memorial for the Iraqi dead would be 141 feet wide and 12.8 miles long."

The second Arlington West was installed in Santa Monica, California on February 15, 2004, a Sunday. It was built on the sand just north of the pier at Santa Monica Beach, "as a way to acknowledge the costs and consequences of the addiction to war as an instrument of international policy" (quote from Veterans for Peace). Like the initial memorial in Santa Barbara, it has been reinstalled each Sunday and Fourth of July since its inception.

Because of the difficulty of finding out the faiths and/or philosophies of the people who died, the cross (a common symbol of Christianity) was selected to be used as a default marker. But both memorials have many markers that are the Star of David or crescents.

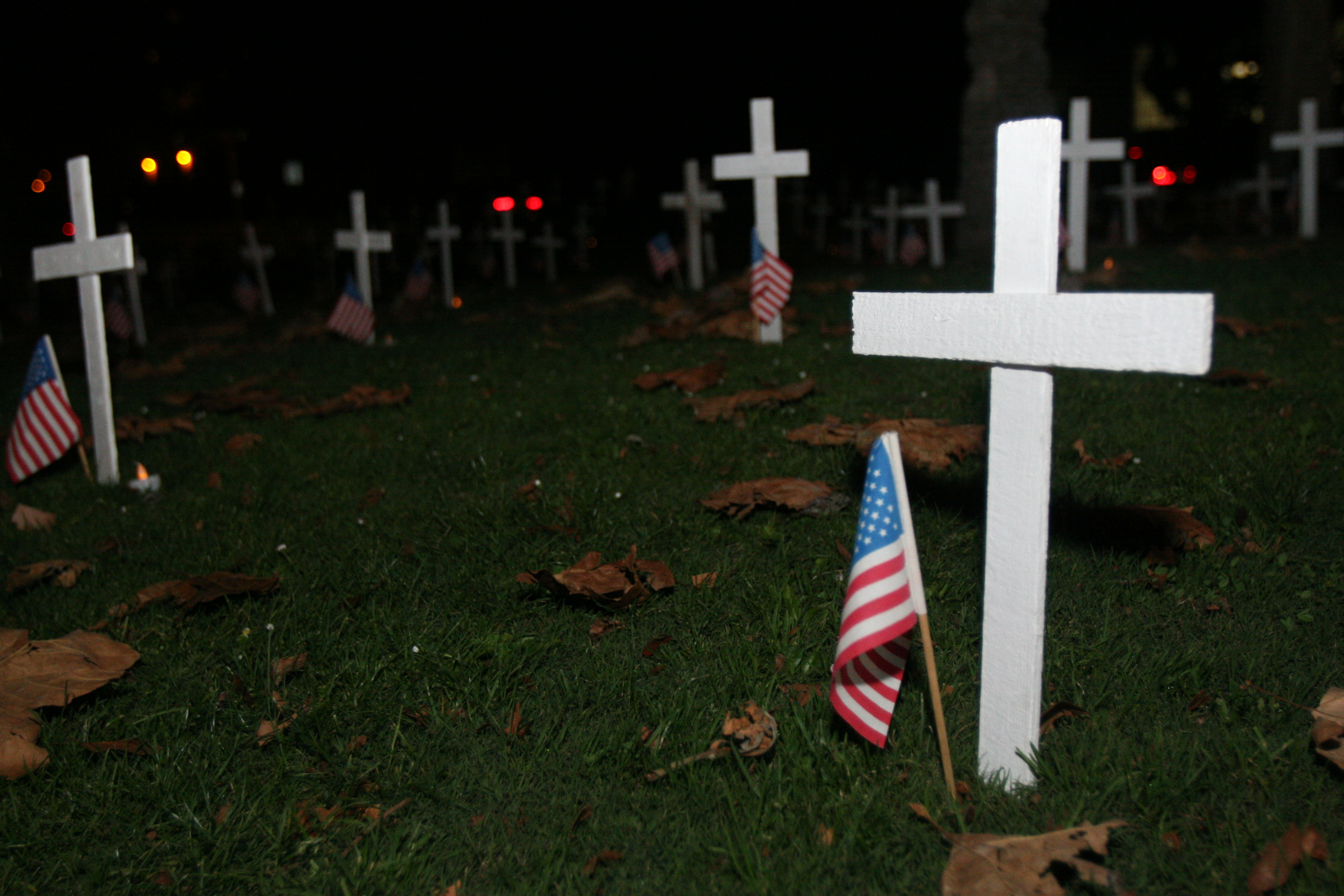
Arlington West, San Diego

Approximately twenty similar memorials have been installed in various locations across the United States and on the West Coast of the U.S.. The San Diego Veterans For Peace, Chapter 91, installs the memorial 6–8 times/year on beaches and parks in San Diego County.

On December 14, 2003 Arlington West Santa Barbara was illuminated by 455 candles in red cups for the city's annual Parade of Lights. The cups glowed a blood red while the light projected upward from the cups caused the white crosses to glow in a flickering, living light. Photojournalists on hand commented that the sight of the illuminated memorial "upstaged the Parade of Lights" (boats in the harbor decked out in Christmas lights). The display drew thousands of spectators during the two hours the candles burned.

Veterans For Peace, an official non-governmental organization founded in 1985 includes men and women veterans from World War II, Korea, Vietnam, the Gulf War, and other conflicts, as well as peacetime veterans. The group has published a 'how-to' for organising, planning and constructing and erecting Arlington West. Several other Memorials have been erected by chapters of Veterans for Peace and other groups.

In the spring and summer of 2005, a similar Arlington West display was taken on a U.S. tour, being installed at places such as Ohio's Kent State University (for the 35th commemoration of the shootings of May 4, 1970), as well as at "Camp Casey," the site of anti-war protester Cindy Sheehan's vigil outside the ranch of President George W. Bush near Crawford, Texas.

In August 2010, the members of the Santa Barbara chapter of Veterans for Peace decided to replace the traditional Arlington West memorial with one which focuses on the War in Afghanistan. The 3000+ crosses for the casualties in Iraq were removed and replaced with 1200+ plastic tombstones representing the fatalities in Afghanistan, ending the memorial dedicated specifically to the Iraq war.

== Film ==
There was a related film, Arlington West: The Film.

== Similar memorials ==
In September 2003, a similar display of ninety white crosses laid out in a military configuration and in the shape of a cross was created by American artist Scott Hemeon and included as one of the art installations for Project One's annual Wind/Sea/Sky beach sculpture exhibition on Easton's Beach in Newport, Rhode Island. This installation, entitled CrossCurrents, predated Arlington West by several months.

First created in 2003, the Lafayette hillside memorial, which overlooks a busy highway in Lafayette, California (near Oakland), has generated considerable controversy since November 2006, when it was expanded and a large sign was added.
