= Fort Qualls =

Fort Qualls referred to the pro-Bush encampment near US President George W. Bush's Crawford, Texas, ranch, which launched a demonstration to counter "Camp Casey" in downtown Crawford.

It was named "Fort Qualls" in honor of Marine Lance Corporal Louis Wayne Qualls (20), who was killed in Fallujah, Iraq, in the fall of 2004.

The Crawford encampment included a banner that says, "God Bless Our President!"

The camp's namesake's father, Gary Qualls, became increasingly frustrated with the Camp Casey anti-war demonstrators when he had to repeatedly remove a cross bearing his son's name from among those the anti-war group had put up along the road to Bush's ranch. Although Mr. Qualls did not wish his fallen son associated with Camp Casey, its supporters kept replacing the Corporal Qualls cross each time it was removed by his father.
