= Lafayette, California =

City in California, United States

Lafayette
- City
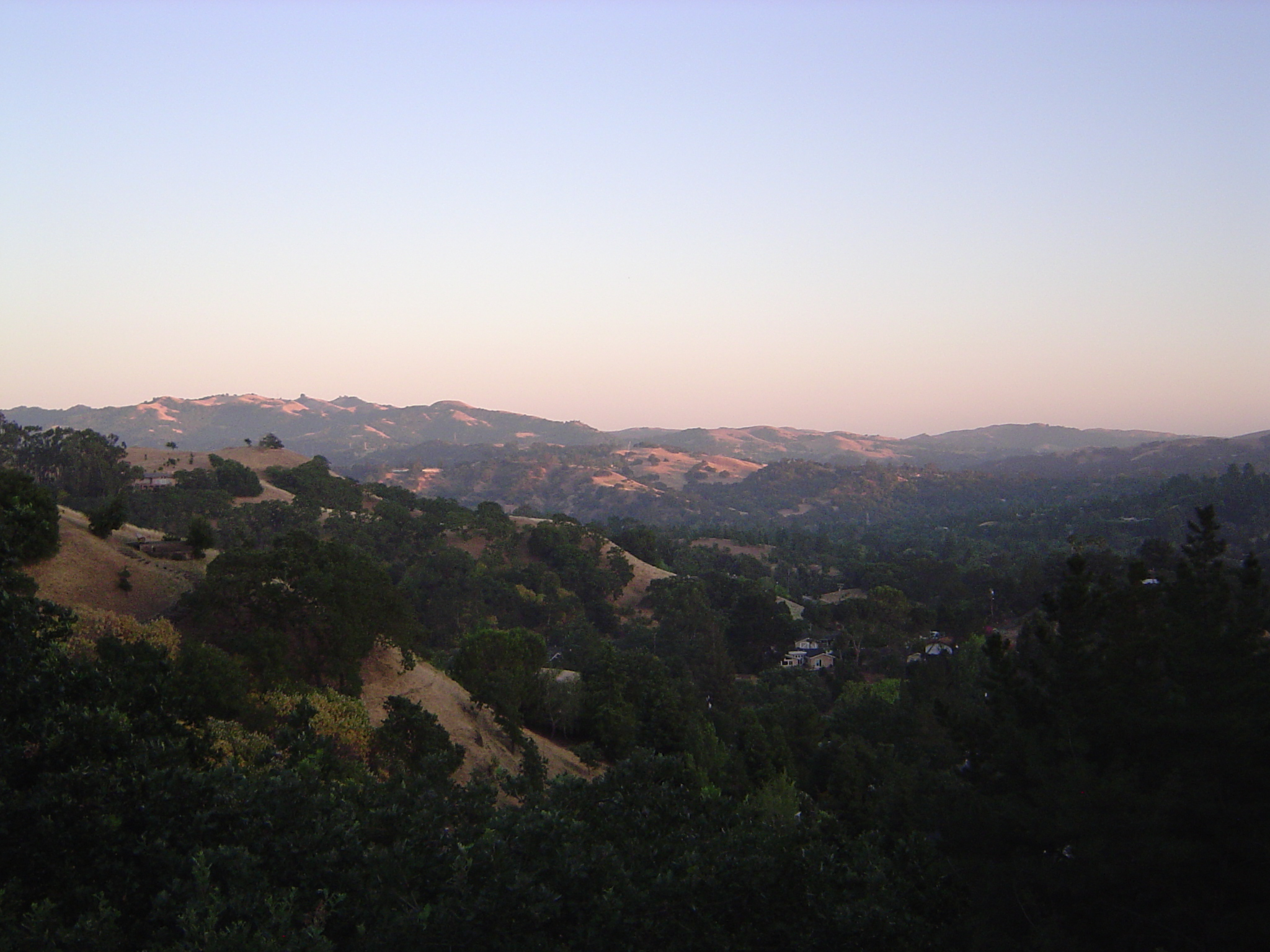
- A view of Lafayette, California
- Interactive map of Lafayette
- Location in the United States
- Coordinates: 37°53′09″N 122°07′05″W
- Country: United States
- State: California
- County: Contra Costa
- Settled: 1848
- Founded: 1857
- Incorporated: July 29, 1968

Government
  - Mayor: Susan Candell
  - State Senator: Tim Grayson (D)
  - State Assembly: Rebecca Bauer-Kahan (D)
  - U. S. Congress: Mark DeSaulnier (D)

Area
  - Total: 15.21 sq mi (39.39 km^{2})
  - Land: 15.04 sq mi (38.95 km^{2})
  - Water: 0.17 sq mi (0.43 km^{2}) 1.08%
- Elevation: 320 ft (97.5 m)

Population (2020)
  - Total: 25,391
  - Density: 1,688/sq mi (651.9/km^{2})
- Time zone: UTC−8 (PST)
  - Summer (DST): UTC−7 (PDT)
- ZIP Code: 94549
- Area code: 925
- FIPS code: 06-39122
- GNIS feature IDs: 277535, 2411591
- Website: www.lovelafayette.org

Lafayette (formerly La Fayette) is a city in Contra Costa County, California, United States. As of 2020, the city's population was 25,391. It was named after the Marquis de Lafayette, a French military officer of the American Revolutionary War.

== Pronunciation ==
The pronunciation of the "fay" in Lafayette can vary among local residents. Common pronunciations include:

- /ˈlɑːfiːɛt/ LAH-fee-eht (rhymes with the word "fee")
- /ˈlɑːfaɪɛt/ LAH-fai-eht (rhymes with the words "eye" and "bye")
- /ˈlɑːfeɪɛt/ LAH-fay-eht (rhymes with the word "pay")

== History ==
Before the colonization of the region by Spain, Lafayette and its vicinity were inhabited by the Saclan tribe of the indigenous Bay Miwok. Ohlone also populated some of the areas along Lafayette Creek. The indigenous inhabitants' first contact with Europeans was in the late 18th century with the founding of Catholic missions in the region. These initial contacts developed into conflict, with years of armed struggle, including a battle on what is currently Lafayette soil in 1797 between the Saclan and the Spanish, and eventually resulting in the subjugation of the native population.

Most of what is currently Lafayette was given as a Mexican land grant, Rancho Acalanes to Candelario Valencia in 1834. The name Acalanes seems to have come from the name of a native village in the area, Ahala-n.

American settlement started with the arrival of Elam Brown from St. Joseph, Missouri, in 1846. He purchased Rancho Acalanes in 1848. The settlement continued to steadily grow due to its proximity to San Francisco; starting with Brown's group of 18 settlers, by the census in 1852, 76 people were listed as living in the area. Brown founded a mill in 1853.

One of the original settlers in Brown's party was Milo J. Hough. He built a hotel in 1853 near Plaza Park and in 1854 was named postmaster of the Acelanus post office, an alternate spelling of the original land grant, Acalanes. The post office was short-lived, closing the following year.

A school began in 1852 in a one-room schoolhouse, taught by a 25-year-old Kentucky migrant, Benjamin Shreve. By 1865 the school had expanded to 43 students in five classes, and so in 1868 a tax levy of $1,000 was used to build a new schoolhouse; school expanded from a five-month year to a nine-month year. In 1893, a new schoolhouse was built to accommodate the increasing number of students; this building still stands today.

On March 2, 1857, the LaFayette post office was established by the U.S. Postal Service. (The official document giving this exact date was supplied to the Lafayette Historical Society in 1993 by the Historical Division of the U.S. Postal Service.) Prior to 1857 the community that is now known as "Lafayette" actually had no official name but was sometimes called Dog Town, Brown's Corner, Brown's Mill, and (when Milo Hough was postmaster in 1854–1855) Alcalanus.

The name "LaFayette" came together with the community's first post office. In 1857 Benjamin Shreve, owner and manager of a roadside hotel-general store (which faced today's Lafayette Plaza), applied for a post office for the community, first requesting the name Centerville. When informed that a post office with that name already existed in California, Shreve suggested La Fayette, after the French general who became a hero of the American Revolution (probably not because his wife was a native of Lafayette, Indiana). The first LaFayette post office was established at 3535 Plaza Way. Shreve became the town's first permanent postmaster, holding the job for 30 years.

Spelling: On the original document from the U.S. Postal Service, dated March 2, 1857, the name “LaFayette” is unmistakably written as one word with a capital “F” in the middle. In 1864 the place name "Lafayette" first appeared on a map of the area, titled "Bancroft's Map of California, Nevada, Utah and Arizona (copyrighted 1863. Scale: 24 miles to 1 inch). Yet research by Ruth Dyer, Lafayette historian, shows that the name of the post office and of the new town itself soon began to be written as two words, “La Fayette.” By 1890 it had changed to one word, "Lafayette," and so appeared in an official communication from the U.S. "Post Office Department" in Feb. 1899. Then by 1905 it was back to two words. Finally on March 31, 1932, the name of the post office was officially changed to Lafayette, which has remained unchanged to this day. Lafayette was the tenth post office established in Contra Costa County. (See Salley, History of California Post Offices).

In the early 1860s, Lafayette was briefly the site of a station for the Pony Express.

In the mid-1900s, Lafayette was transformed from an agricultural village into a commuter town, and was incorporated in 1968.

== Geography ==
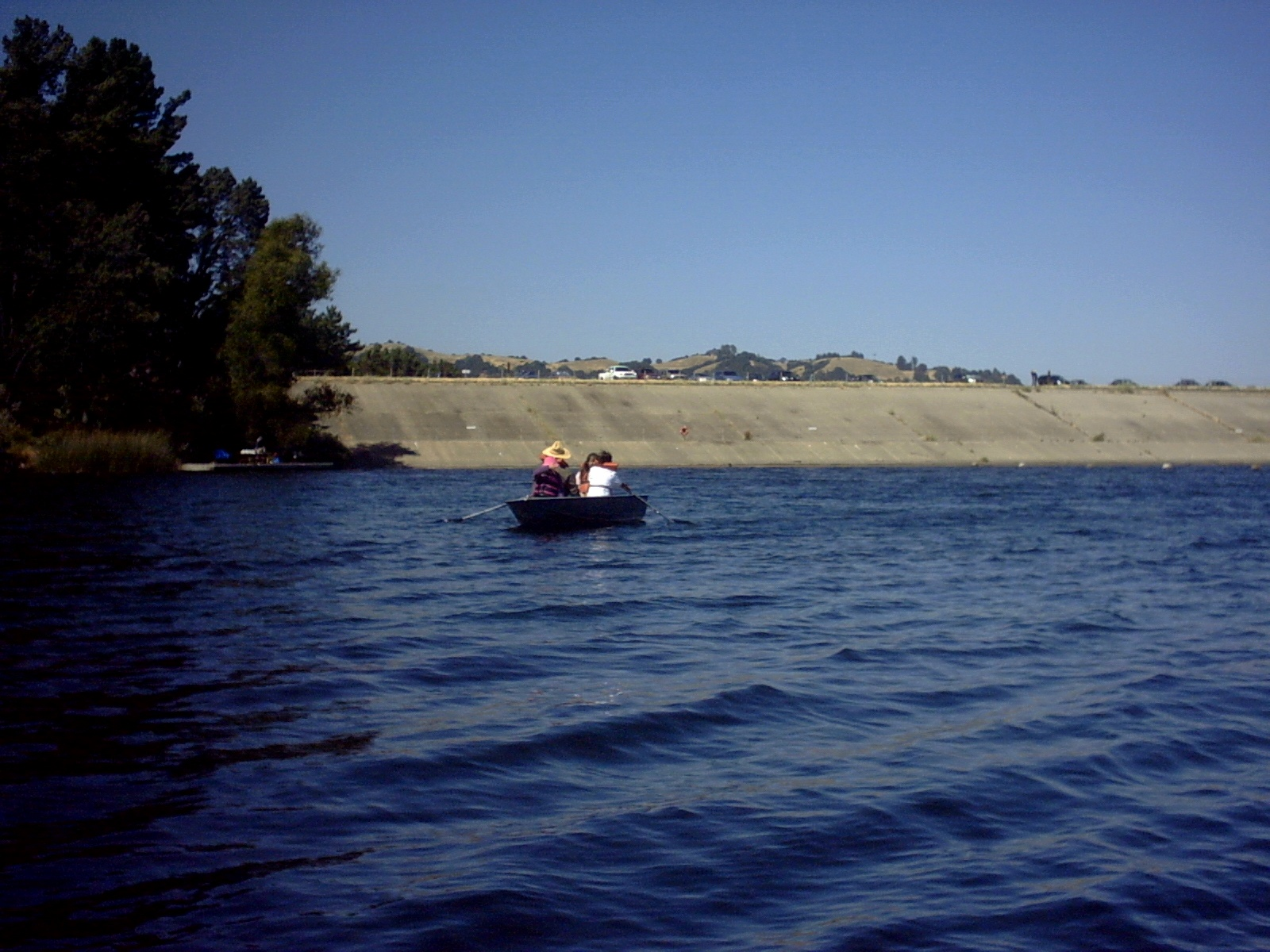
Lafayette Reservoir

Lafayette is located at 37°53′09″N 122°07′05″W. According to the United States Census Bureau, the city has a total area of 15.4 square miles (40 km^{2}), of which 15.2 square miles (39 km^{2}) is land and 0.2 square miles (0.52 km^{2}) (1.08%) is water.

The city is part of the greater San Francisco Bay Area and has its own station on the BART public transit system. Lafayette is situated between Walnut Creek, Moraga, and Orinda, and, together with the latter two towns, is considered locally as part of "Lamorinda".

=== Climate ===
Lafayette is separated from greater Berkeley and Oakland by the Berkeley Hills (and the Caldecott Tunnel running beneath), a geographical boundary within the East Bay which also represents interesting meteorological, cultural, and political distinctions. Like the rest of the San Francisco Bay Area, Lafayette has a Mediterranean climate (Köppen climate classification Csa); however, the climate differences can be striking: during the summer, temperatures can soar beyond 100 °F (38 °C) in Lafayette and its neighboring cities while the areas west of the hills and nearer to the bay remain up to 20 °F (11 °C) cooler. Summers are warm, dry and very sunny (although mornings can be foggy); winters are cool and damp, with occasional freezes. Most of the annual rainfall comes in the winter, although there are still plenty of clear days during that time. The record high temperature is 115 °F (46 °C), set in July 1972. The record low temperature is 19 °F (−7 °C), set in December 1990. The region directly east of the hills is generally known for its more suburban or rural atmosphere, and features rolling, grassy hills which highlight a more peaceful and domestic aura. In the southwestern part of Lafayette, is the Lafayette Reservoir, and Briones Regional Park extends into the northern part of Lafayette. Lafayette's wildlife communities include mixed woods and oak woodlands.

Climate data for Lafayette, California
Month	Jan	Feb	Mar	Apr	May	Jun	Jul	Aug	Sep	Oct	Nov	Dec	Year
Record high °F (°C)	71 (22)	80 (27)	88 (31)	98 (37)	104 (40)	110 (43)	115 (46)	107 (42)	108 (42)	103 (39)	82 (28)	74 (23)	115 (46)
Mean daily maximum °F (°C)	54 (12)	60 (16)	64 (18)	71 (22)	78 (26)	84 (29)	87 (31)	87 (31)	83 (28)	75 (24)	63 (17)	55 (13)	72 (22)
Mean daily minimum °F (°C)	39 (4)	42 (6)	44 (7)	46 (8)	50 (10)	54 (12)	55 (13)	55 (13)	54 (12)	49 (9)	43 (6)	39 (4)	48 (9)
Record low °F (°C)	20 (−7)	26 (−3)	29 (−2)	29 (−2)	34 (1)	31 (−1)	41 (5)	42 (6)	40 (4)	34 (1)	25 (−4)	19 (−7)	19 (−7)
Average precipitation inches (mm)	4.25 (108)	3.81 (97)	3.24 (82)	1.04 (26)	.46 (12)	.12 (3.0)	.02 (0.51)	.08 (2.0)	.24 (6.1)	.94 (24)	2.59 (66)	2.79 (71)	19.58 (497.61)
Source: Intellicast

== Demographics ==
Historical population
Census	Pop.	Note	%±
1960	7,114		—
1970	20,484		187.9%
1980	20,837		1.7%
1990	23,501		12.8%
2000	23,908		1.7%
2010	23,893		−0.1%
2020	25,391		6.3%
U.S. Decennial Census

=== 2020 census ===
As of the 2020 census, Lafayette had a population of 25,391 and a population density of 1,690.0 inhabitants per square mile (652.5/km^{2}). The median age was 45.2 years. The age distribution was 24.3% under the age of 18, 6.0% aged 18 to 24, 19.3% aged 25 to 44, 29.1% aged 45 to 64, and 21.2% aged 65 or older. For every 100 females, there were 95.8 males, and for every 100 females age 18 and over, there were 93.9 males age 18 and over.

The census reported that 99.7% of the population lived in households, 0.1% lived in non-institutionalized group quarters, and 0.2% were institutionalized. Of the population, 99.6% lived in urban areas and 0.4% lived in rural areas.

There were 9,506 households, of which 35.8% had children under the age of 18. Of all households, 64.4% were married-couple households, 4.4% were cohabiting couple households, 19.3% had a female householder with no spouse or partner present, and 11.9% had a male householder with no spouse or partner present. About 19.7% of households were made up of individuals, and 10.8% had someone living alone who was 65 years of age or older. The average household size was 2.66, and there were 7,175 families (75.5% of all households).

There were 9,999 housing units at an average density of 665.5 units per square mile (257.0 units/km^{2}). Of all housing units, 95.1% were occupied and 4.9% were vacant. The homeowner vacancy rate was 0.7%, and the rental vacancy rate was 5.1%. Of occupied units, 73.9% were owner-occupied and 26.1% were renter-occupied.

Racial composition as of the 2020 census
Race	Number	Percent
White	18,489	72.8%
Black or African American	180	0.7%
American Indian and Alaska Native	58	0.2%
Asian	3,201	12.6%
Native Hawaiian and Other Pacific Islander	28	0.1%
Some other race	462	1.8%
Two or more races	2,973	11.7%
Hispanic or Latino (of any race)	2,075	8.2%

=== 2023 ACS estimates ===
In 2023, the US Census Bureau estimated that 14.1% of the population were foreign-born. Of all people aged 5 or older, 82.9% spoke only English at home, 3.4% spoke Spanish, 9.1% spoke other Indo-European languages, 3.7% spoke Asian or Pacific Islander languages, and 0.8% spoke other languages. Of those aged 25 or older, 99.1% were high school graduates and 77.0% had a bachelor's degree.

The median household income was $222,393, and the per capita income was $116,206. About 1.6% of families and 3.9% of the population were below the poverty line.

== Arts and culture ==
=== Library ===
The Lafayette Library and Learning Center of the Contra Costa County Library is located in Lafayette. Oakmont Memorial Park is a cemetery in Lafayette. Oakwood serves as a country club/fitness center for Lamorindans.

=== Cross of Lafayette Memorial ===
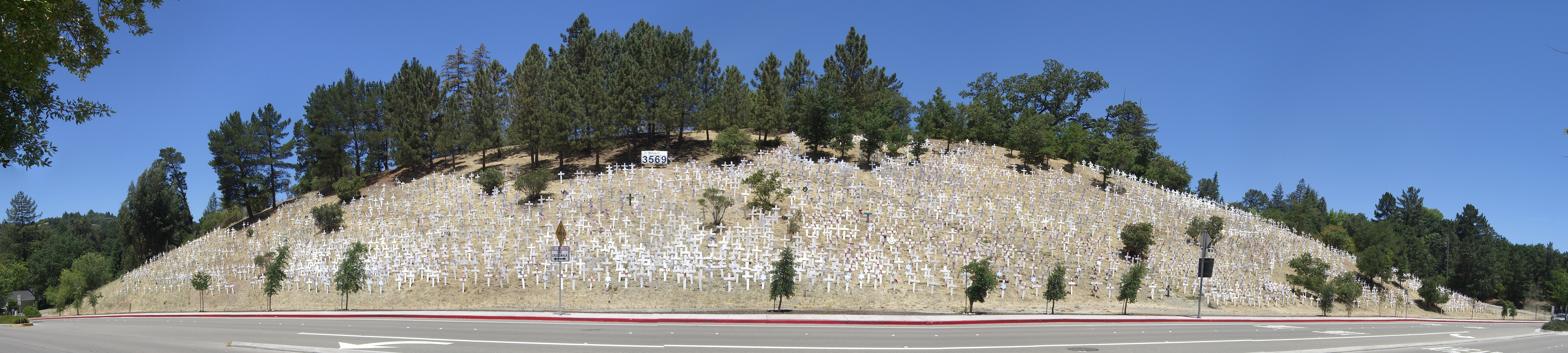
View of the memorial from the Lafayette BART parking lot

In November 2006, area residents began placing crosses on a hill overlooking the Lafayette BART station and Highway 24 "to represent and memorialize the American soldiers who have died in the ongoing Iraqi war." As of January 2014, there are approximately 6,000 crosses in place, representing the US troops who have died in Iraq, and there is also a large sign displaying the total number of deaths. The memorial has generated public attention, media coverage and counter-protests due to its visibility from the commuter thoroughfare below. Also, since the creation of the memorial, there have been several incidents of vandalism. While some show support for the protest, other residents complain that it is disrespectful to the US military in Iraq and that it is an eyesore to the community. The memorial is on private property and modifications and trespassing without consent of the owners has been common.

=== Lafayette Park Theater ===
Another historical site found in Lafayette is the Park Theater, which first opened in 1941, and then ceased operations in 2005. The Park Theater was originally a movie theater located on an intersection where the La Fayette statue was built. It then showed its last movie before ceasing operations in 2005. Recently, however, efforts have been made to reopen the Park theater for viewing.

== Government ==
As of February 10, 2021, Lafayette has 19,151 registered voters with 10,177 (53%) registered as Democrats, 3,813 (20%) registered as Republicans, and 4,298 (22%) decline to state voters.

Lafayette vote by party in presidential elections
Year	Democratic	Republican
2024	75.9% 11,997	20.8% 3,292
2020	76.6% 12,995	21.1% 3,578
2016	72.3% 10,581	21.2% 3,106
2012	62.0% 9,001	35.6% 5,174
2008	67.5% 10,092	30.7% 4,581
2004	60.3% 8,520	38.4% 5,435
2000	52.2% 7,110	42.8% 5,840
1996	48.6% 6,442	42.7% 5,656
1992	43.2% 6,161	35.4% 5,054
1988	40.6% 5,424	58.4% 7,806
1984	32.6% 4,391	66.3% 8,913
1980	23.7% 2,594	60.5% 6,615
1976	30.6% 3,142	67.6% 6,939
1972	30.0% 3,165	67.6% 7,147
1968	30.6% 2,856	65.7% 6,139

== Education ==
Most of Lafayette is in the Lafayette Elementary School District. A small portion is in the Orinda Union Elementary School District. All of Lafayette is in the Acalanes Union High School District.

=== Primary and secondary schools ===
- Public
  - Lafayette Elementary School
  - Burton Valley Elementary
  - Happy Valley Elementary School
  - Springhill Elementary School
  - Stanley Middle School
  - Acalanes High School
- Private
  - The Springstone School (middle and high school)
  - Contra Costa Jewish Day School
  - Chabad Hebrew School of Lamorinda
  - St. Perpetua School
  - The Meher Schools (preschool and elementary school)

== Notable people ==
The following is a list of notable residents of Lafayette, past and present.

=== Past ===
- Don Agrati, actor and musician, as Don Grady known for his roles in My Three Sons and The Mickey Mouse Club. Deceased.
- Jon-Erik Beckjord, paranormal researcher and investigator, specialty was Bigfoot and related cryptids, such as the Yeti. Deceased.
- Mona Beaumont, French-born American painter and printmaker.
- Frank DeVol, composer, arranger, conductor, singer ("Teddy Bear's Picnic"), on TV's Fernwood 2 Night as Happy Kyne. Died in Lafayette.
- Peter Duesberg (1936–2026), molecular biologist, died in Lafayette
- C. Carl Jennings (1910–2003) blacksmith and artist, owner of El Diablo Forge in Lafayette for many years
- Henry J. Kaiser, industrialist, owner of Kaiser Industries (based in Oakland comprising more than 100 companies), builder of Hoover Dam, Liberty Ships, creator of Kaiser Permanente health organization. Built and lived in elaborate estate in west Lafayette in the early 1950s.
- Daniel E. Koshland Jr. (1920–2007), biochemist and former chief editor of Science, lived and died in Lafayette.
- Brent Mydland, musician, lived in Lafayette for a time before his death in 1990. buried at Oakmont Memorial Park in Lafayette.
- Buster Posey, Major League Baseball catcher for the San Francisco Giants
- Hideo Sasaki, American landscape architect
- Glenn T. Seaborg, University of California at Berkeley chemist and Nobel laureate (1951) prominent in the discovery of Plutonium (in 1941) and several transuranic elements. Element 106, Seaborgium, is named in his honor. Worked on Manhattan Project developing first atomic bombs. Died in 1999.
- Emilio Segrè, an Italian physicist and Nobel laureate who discovered the elements technetium and astatine, and the antiproton, a sub-atomic antiparticle, for which he was awarded the Nobel Prize in Physics in 1959
- Alexander Shulgin, chemist best known for discovery and use of hundreds of psychoactive compounds. Died June 2, 2014.
- Charles Tickner, Olympic bronze medalist figure skater in the 1980 Winter Olympics
- Jake Larson, TikToker and World War II veteran. Died on July 17, 2025.

=== Present ===
- Cam, singer and songwriter, known for the song "Burning House"
- Natalie Coughlin, gold medal-winning swimmer who represented United States at 2004 Olympics in Athens, 2008 Olympics in Beijing, and 2012 Olympics in London
- Wayne Ferreira, South African tennis player
- Will Forte, actor, writer, and comedian best known for Saturday Night Live
- Justin Fox (born 1964), financial journalist, commentator, and writer
- Peter Hayes, guitarist and singer of Black Rebel Motorcycle Club
- Daniel Horowitz, prominent attorney who was frequent TV commentator during the trial of Scott Peterson for the murder of Laci Peterson
- Brad Lackey, former professional motorcycle racer and 1982 Motocross World Champion
- Beau Levesque, assistant coach for the Los Angeles Lakers
- William Shurtleff, writer, researcher, bibliographer, historian, and popularizer of soyfoods
