= FBG =

FBG or Fbg may refer to:

- Fiber Bragg grating
- Finnish Border Guard
- Fredericksburg station, Amtrak code FBG
- Simmons Army Airfield, North Carolina, US, by IATA code
- FBG Duck, American rapper and songwriter
