= The Special Warfare Memorial Statue =

Coordinates: 35.109962°N 79.002491°W

Special Warfare Memorial Statue
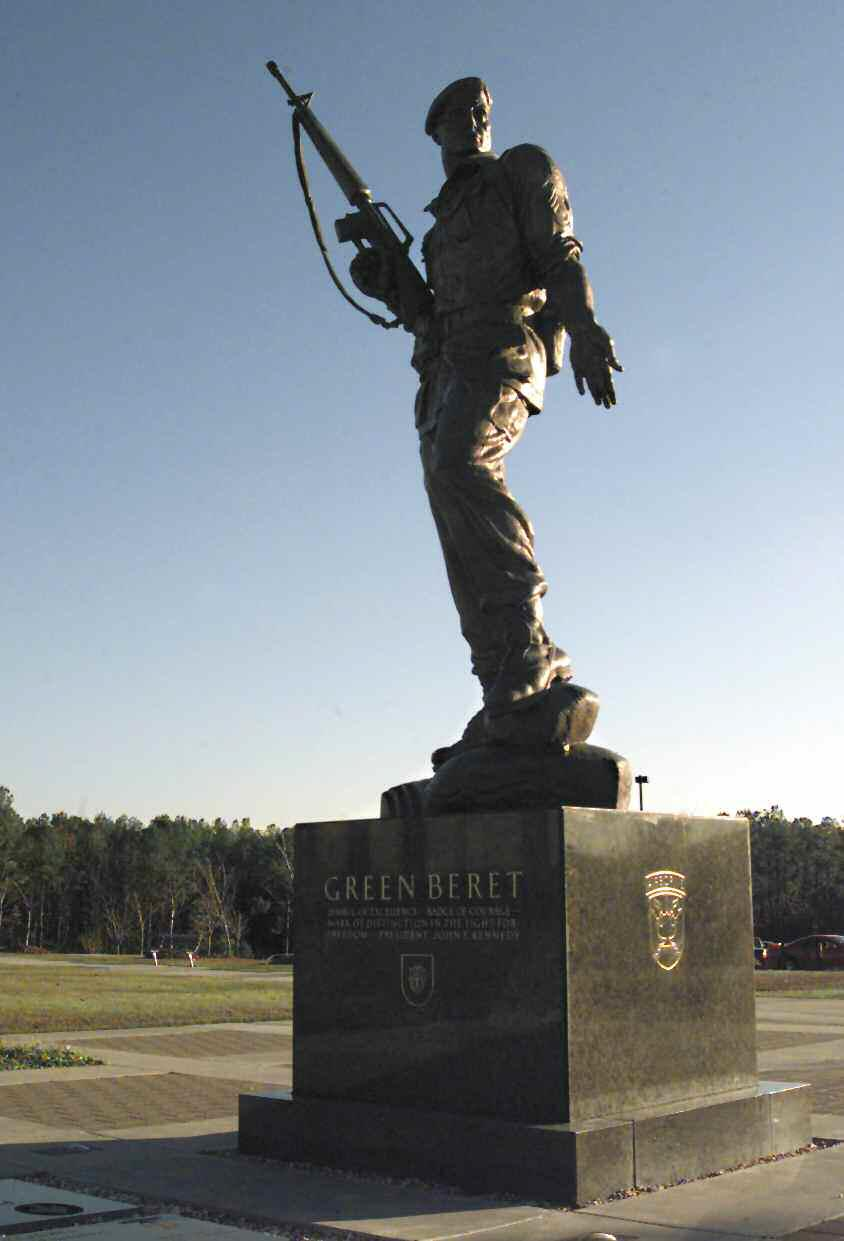
- Special Warfare Memorial Statue
- Location: Memorial Plaza, Fort Bragg, North Carolina
- Designer: Donald De Lue
- Material: Bronze
- Height: 12 ft; including pedestal, 22 ft
- Opening date: 1969

The Special Warfare Memorial Statue — known informally as Bronze Bruce — was the first memorial in the United States to soldiers who had served in the Vietnam War. It was created in 1968 by sculptor Donald De Lue (1897–1988) and dedicated on November 19, 1969. The statue is the centerpiece of the U.S. Army Special Operations Command's Memorial Plaza at Fort Bragg, North Carolina, which honors all Army special operations soldiers. The statue depicts a Special Forces soldier as most all of the Army special operations soldiers killed in Vietnam were SF.

== Symbolism ==
According to the United States Army Special Operations Command website:

The 12-foot statue stands upon a rare green granite pedestal that brings the total height of the statue to 22 feet tall. It is representative of a Special Forces non-commissioned officer, wearing the rank of a sergeant first class. The soldier is dressed in the jungle fatigues worn in Vietnam by U.S. troops. He carries the M16 rifle, a tool of his profession, in his right hand. His finger is not placed on the trigger of his weapon, but is "at the ready" in preparation for any threat. His stance upon a rocky ledge with one foot crushing the snake is symbolic of tyranny in the world and the threats and dangers that will instantly bring him to action. While possessing power and extraordinary capabilities, he offers a gentle hand of friendship to the unseen oppressed of the world. He is fully able to exercise his training when it is needed, and he is also fully willing to help those in need. He is the perfect warrior from the past, a healer, a teacher and an opponent of evil. He serves all over the world today and willingly faces any mission. His is the standard to which all Army special operations soldiers aspire.

CSM Paul M. Darcy, at the time an SFC, posed for the statue. The original concept sketch and a letter from Mr DeLue to CSM Darcy were donated to the Special Forces Museum in 2015. The base of the statue contains a time capsule with an SF uniform, green beret, a bust of John F. Kennedy, and a copy of Kennedy's speech when presenting the green beret to the Special Forces.

== Cost ==
The statue's cost of $100,000 was funded entirely by donations. John Wayne, co-director and star of the 1968 film, The Green Berets, and Barry Sadler, former SF soldier and composer of "The Ballad of the Green Berets", both donated $5,000 for the statue. Robert McNamara, who was Secretary of Defense at the time, donated $1,000. The remaining donations came from Special Forces soldiers from all over the world.
