= Fort Bragg =

U.S. Army installation in North Carolina

- Cumberland / Hoke counties (main post), Harnett County (Linden Oaks) near Fayetteville, North Carolina
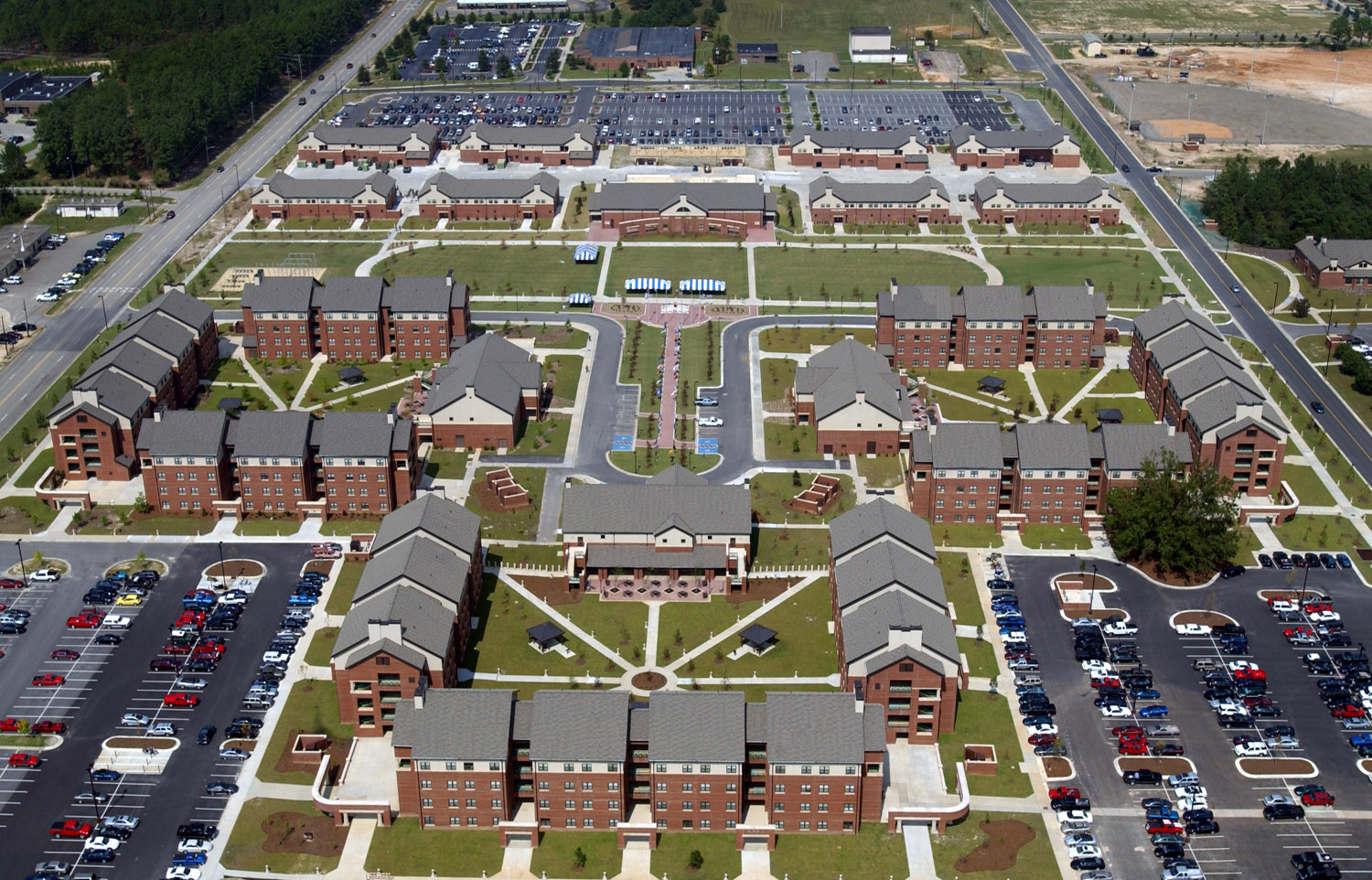
- Barracks of the 1st Brigade, 82nd Airborne Division at Fort Bragg

Site information
- Type: Army
- Controlled by: United States

Site history
- Built: 1918
- In use: 1918–present

Garrison information
- Current commander: Colonel Luke Wittmer
- Garrison: XVIII Airborne Corps; For tenant units, see below
- CDP
- Location in the United States Location in North Carolina
- Coordinates: 35°8′21″N 78°59′57″W
- Country: United States
- State: North Carolina
- County: Cumberland

Area
  - Total: 251.0 sq mi (650.2 km^{2})
  - Land: 249.7 sq mi (646.8 km^{2})
  - Water: 1.3 sq mi (3.4 km^{2})

Population (2010)
  - Total: 39,457
  - Density: 158.0/sq mi (61.01/km^{2})
- Time zone: UTC−5 (Eastern (EST))
  - Summer (DST): UTC−4 (EDT)
- ZIP Codes: 28307, 28310
- Area codes: 910, 472
- FIPS code: 37-24260

Fort Bragg (renamed Fort Liberty from 2023 to 2025) is a U.S. Army military installation located in North Carolina. It ranks among the largest military bases in the world by population, with more than 52,000 military personnel.

Covering more than 251 square miles (650 km^{2}), Fort Bragg is home to the Army's XVIII Airborne Corps and serves as the headquarters of the U.S. Army Special Operations Command, which oversees the 1st Special Forces Command (Airborne) and the 75th Ranger Regiment. Additionally, it hosts the 82nd Airborne Division, United States Army Western Hemisphere Command, U.S. Army Reserve Command, and Womack Army Medical Center. Fort Bragg also operates two airfields: Pope Field, where the U.S. Air Force stations global airlift and special operations units, as well as the Air Force Combat Control School, and Simmons Army Airfield, which supports Army aviation units for airborne and special operations missions.

The installation was originally named for Confederate general Braxton Bragg. In 2023, the U.S. Department of Defense renamed the installation "Fort Liberty" due to controversy surrounding memorials to Confederate leaders. In February 2025, the U.S. Army changed the name of the installation back to "Fort Bragg", but in honor of World War II paratrooper Roland L. Bragg instead of the Confederate general.

== History ==
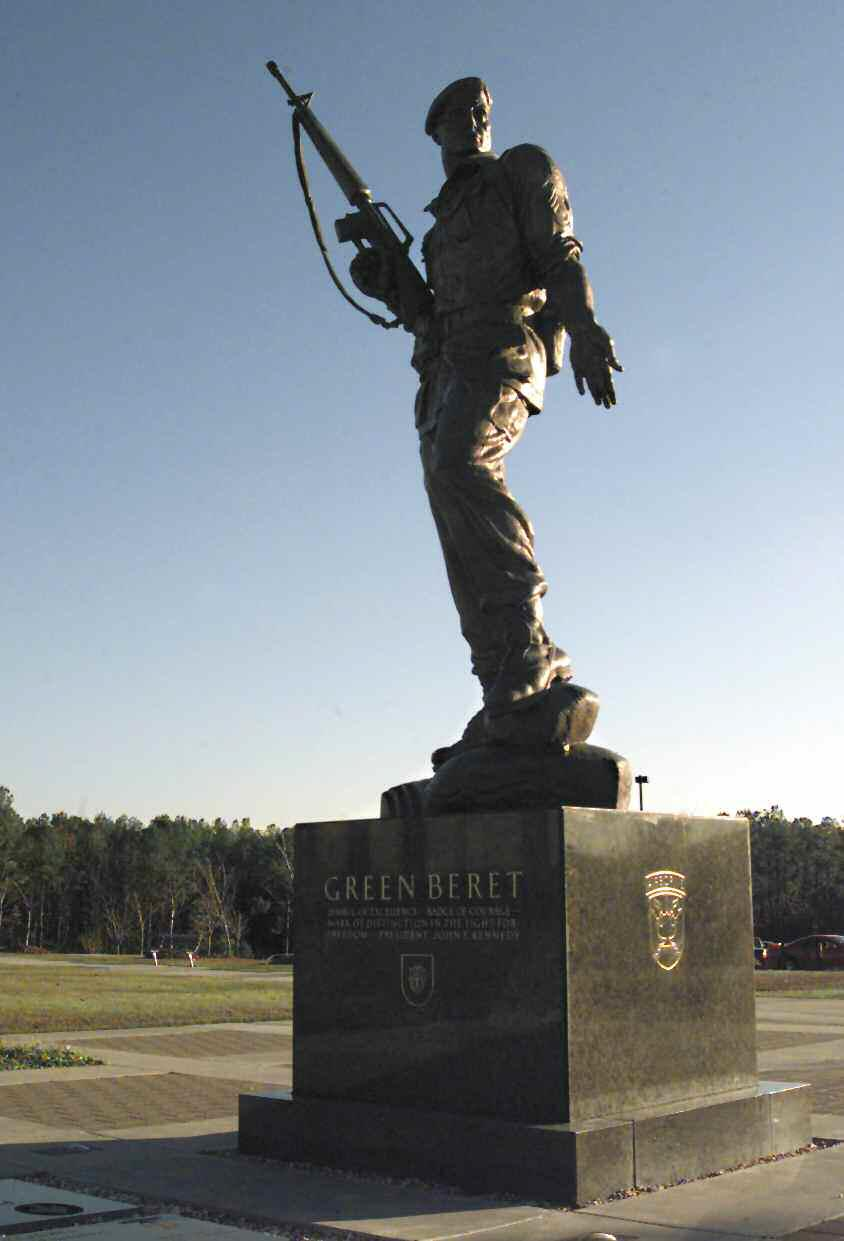
The Special Warfare Memorial Statue by Donald De Lue (1968) at Fort Bragg

=== World War I ===
Camp Bragg was established in 1918 as an artillery training ground. The Chief of Field Artillery, Major General William J. Snow, was seeking an area having suitable terrain, adequate water, rail facilities, and a climate suitable for year-round training, and he decided that the area met all of the desired criteria. Camp Bragg (later Fort Bragg) was originally named after Braxton Bragg, a former U.S. Army artillery commander and West Point graduate who later in life became a well known Confederate general during the American Civil War.

The aim was for six artillery brigades to be stationed there and $6 million (equivalent to $128,400,000 in 2025) was spent on the land and cantonments. There was an airfield on the camp used by aircraft and balloons for artillery spotters. The airfield was named Pope Field on 1 April 1919, in honor of First Lieutenant Harley H. Pope, an airman who was killed while flying nearby. The work on the camp was finished on 1 November 1919.

The original plan for six brigades was abandoned after World War I ended and once demobilization had started. The artillerymen, and their equipment and material from Camp McClellan, Alabama, were moved to Camp Bragg and testing began on long-range weapons that were a product of the war. The six artillery brigades were reduced to two cantonments and a garrison was to be built for Army troops as well as a National Guard training center. In early 1921 two field artillery units, the 13th and 17th Field Artillery Brigades, began training at Camp Bragg. The same year, the Long Street Church and 6 acres (2.4 ha) of property were acquired for the reservation. The church was listed on the National Register of Historic Places in 1974.

Due to the post-war cutbacks, the camp was nearly closed for good when the War Department issued orders to close the camp on 7 August 1921. Brig. Gen. Albert J. Bowley was commander at the camp and after much campaigning, and getting the Secretary of War to visit the camp, the closing order was canceled on 16 September 1921. The Field Artillery Board was transferred to Camp Bragg on 1 February 1922.

Camp Bragg was renamed Fort Bragg, to signify becoming a permanent Army post, on 30 September 1922. From 1923 to 1924 permanent structures were constructed on Fort Bragg, including four barracks.

=== World War II ===
By 1940, the year after World War II started, the population of Fort Bragg was 5,400 and by the following year had reached 67,000. Various units trained at Fort Bragg during World War II, including the 9th Infantry Division, 2nd Armored Division, 82nd Airborne Division, 100th Infantry Division, and various field artillery groups. The population reached a peak of 159,000 during the war years. From 1941 to 1942, Colonel Charles Bernadou Elliott served as commander of the post; he had previously served as chief of staff and acting commander of the 9th Infantry Division.

=== Cold War ===
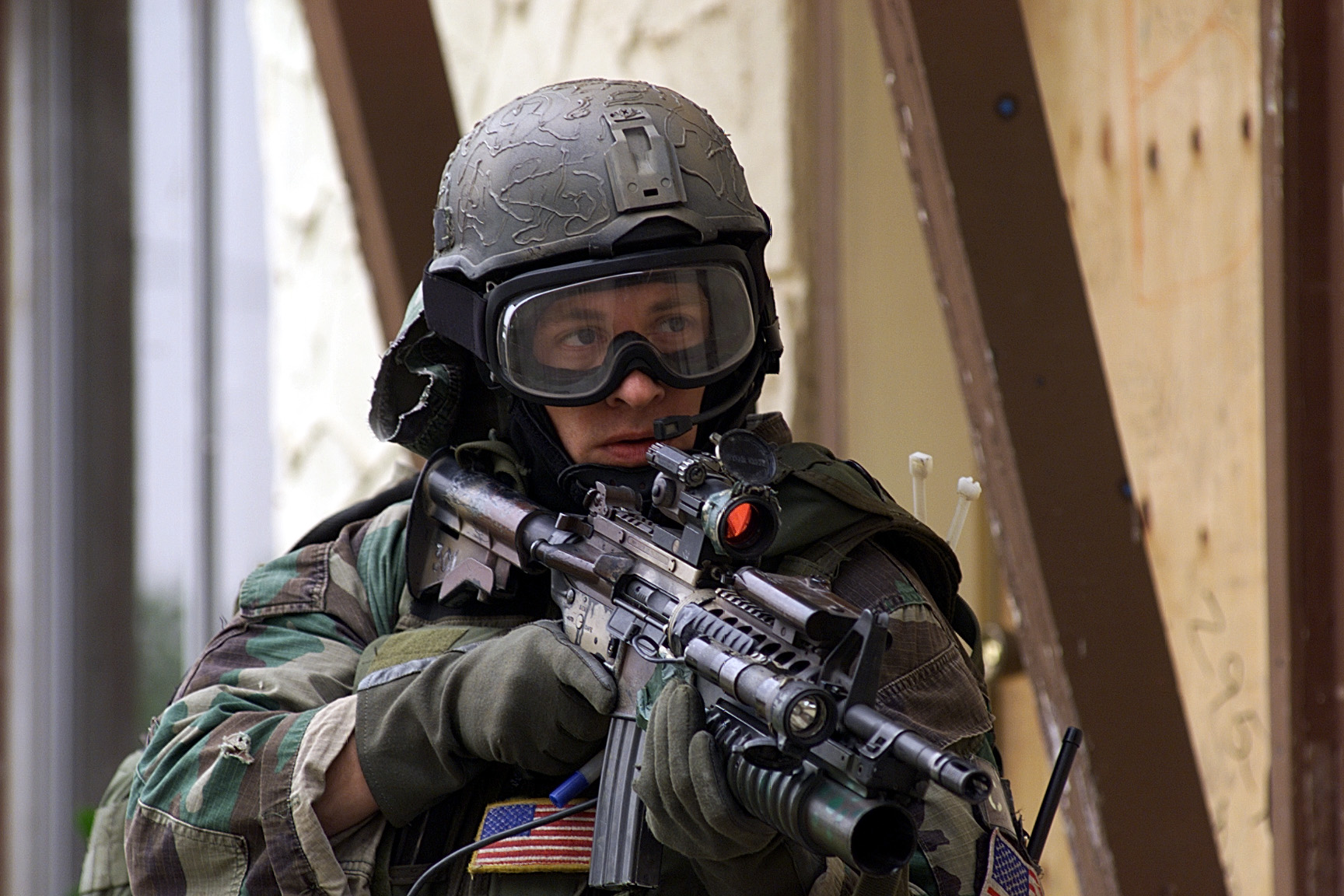
An Army Special Forces operator with his customized M4 carbine prepares to breach an entryway while training in close quarters battle tactics at Fort Bragg, mid-1999

Following World War II, the 82nd Airborne Division was permanently stationed at Fort Bragg, the only large unit there for some time. In July 1951, the XVIII Airborne Corps was reactivated at Fort Bragg. Fort Bragg became a center for unconventional warfare, with the creation of the Psychological Warfare Center in April 1952, followed by the 10th Special Forces Group.

In 1961, the 5th Special Forces Group (Airborne) was activated at Fort Bragg, with the mission of training counter-insurgency forces in Southeast Asia. Also in 1961, the "Iron Mike" statue, a tribute to all Airborne soldiers, past, present, and future was dedicated. In early 1962 the 326 Army Security Agency Company, de-activated after the Korean War, was reactivated at Fort Bragg under XVIIIth Corps. In August of that year, an operational contingent of that Company was relocated to Homestead AFB Florida, due to the Cuban Missile Crisis. Circa 1963, that contingent was reassigned to the newly created USASA 6th Field Station. More than 200,000 young men underwent basic combat training here during the period 1966–70. At the peak of the Vietnam War in 1968, Fort Bragg's military population rose to 57,840. In June 1972, the 1st Corps Support Command arrived at Fort Bragg.

In the 1980s, there was a series of deployments of tenant units to the Caribbean, first to Grenada in 1983, Honduras in 1988, and to Panama in 1989. The 5th Special Forces Group departed Fort Bragg in the late 1980s.

=== Middle East wars ===
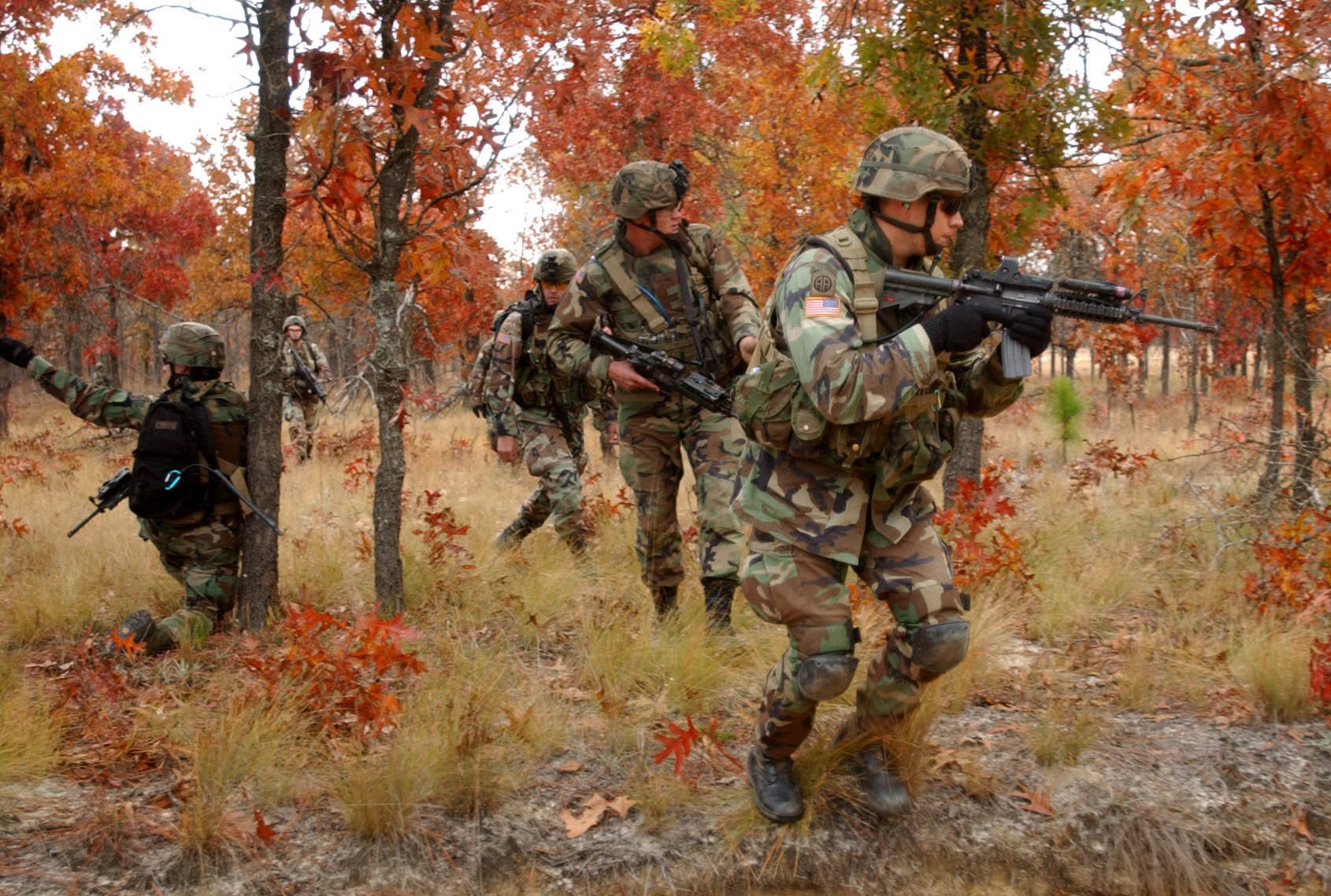
Soldiers of the 82nd Airborne Division with their M4 carbines training on Fort Bragg, December 2005

In 1990, the XVIII Airborne Corps and the 82nd Airborne Division deployed to Saudi Arabia in support of Operation Desert Shield and Operation Desert Storm. In the mid- and late 1990s, there was increased modernization of the facilities in Fort Bragg. The World War II wooden barracks were largely removed, a new main post exchange was built, and Devers Elementary School was opened, along with several other projects.

As a result of campaigns in Afghanistan and Iraq, the units on Fort Bragg have seen a sizeable increase to their operations tempo (OPTEMPO), with units conducting two, three, or even four or more deployments to combat zones. As directed by law, and in accordance with the recommendations of the 2005 Base Realignment and Closure Commission, Fort McPherson, Georgia, closed and U.S. Army Forces Command and U.S. Army Reserve Command relocated to Fort Bragg, North Carolina. A new FORSCOM/U.S. Army Reserve Command Headquarters facility completed construction at Fort Bragg in June 2011. Forces Command hosted 24 June 2011, an Army "Casing of the Colors" ceremony on Fort McPherson and an "uncasing of colors ceremony" on 1 August 2011, at Fort Bragg. On 1 March 2011, Pope Field, the former Pope Air Force Base, was absorbed into Fort Bragg.

=== Name changes ===
Fort Liberty, main gate sign (All-American gate), June 2023

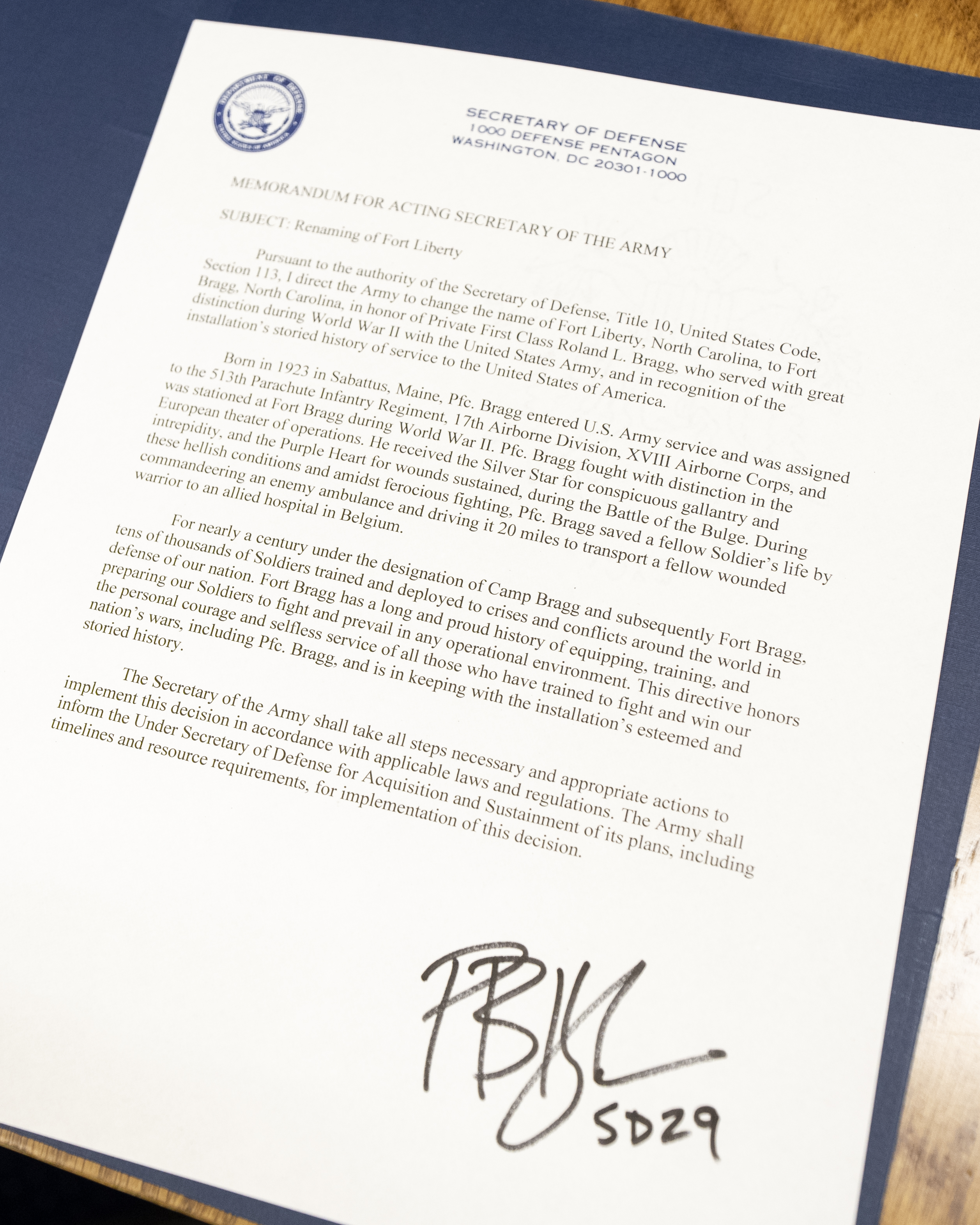
February 2025 memorandum renaming Fort Liberty to Fort Bragg

On 1 January 2021, the United States Senate passed a veto override of the William M. (Mac) Thornberry National Defense Authorization Act for Fiscal Year 2021. This new law helped in establishing the Naming Commission, which would select new names for Department of Defense properties named in honor of Confederate officials. In the law, Congress determined that those who chose to side with the Confederate Army during the American Civil War were unworthy of being namesakes. In March 2022, the commission published a list of 87 potential names for nine Army installations, including Fort Bragg.

In May 2022, the commission officially recommended that Fort Bragg be renamed to Fort Liberty. The commission gave the Pentagon until October to accept the name change; Secretary of Defense Lloyd Austin did so on 6 October 2022. According to a memorandum published by the Pentagon at the time, the new name changes cost the Department of Defense $62.5 million. In particular, the change to Fort Liberty was calculated to cost the Department of Defense $6,374,230, making it the most expensive name change. In accordance with the National Defense Authorization Act, the local garrison had until early 2024 to complete the name change. On 2 June 2023, Fort Liberty officially adopted its new name in a public ceremony.

On 10 February 2025, Secretary of Defense Pete Hegseth issued a memorandum directing the U.S. Army to rename Fort Liberty back to Fort Bragg, but this time in honor of Private First Class Roland L. Bragg, rather than the original namesake. Bragg was stationed at Fort Bragg during World War II and later fought with distinction in the European theater. He received the Silver Star for gallantry and the Purple Heart for wounds sustained, during the Battle of the Bulge. He was recognized for having saved a fellow soldier's life by commandeering an enemy ambulance. Bragg's name was one of thousands submitted by the public before officials decided to name the base Fort Liberty instead of naming it after an individual. The renaming took effect on 14 February 2025. The cost of the second name change is estimated to be between $6 million and $8 million.

== Tenant units ==
List of units (by SSI)
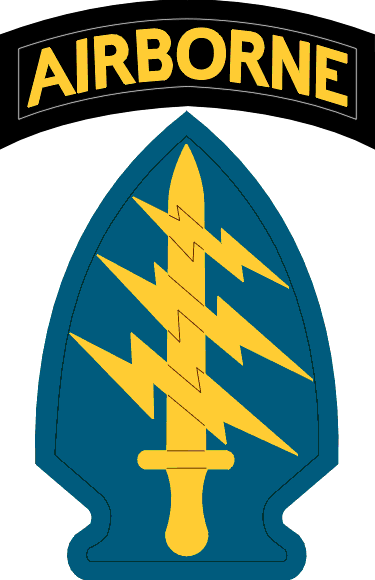
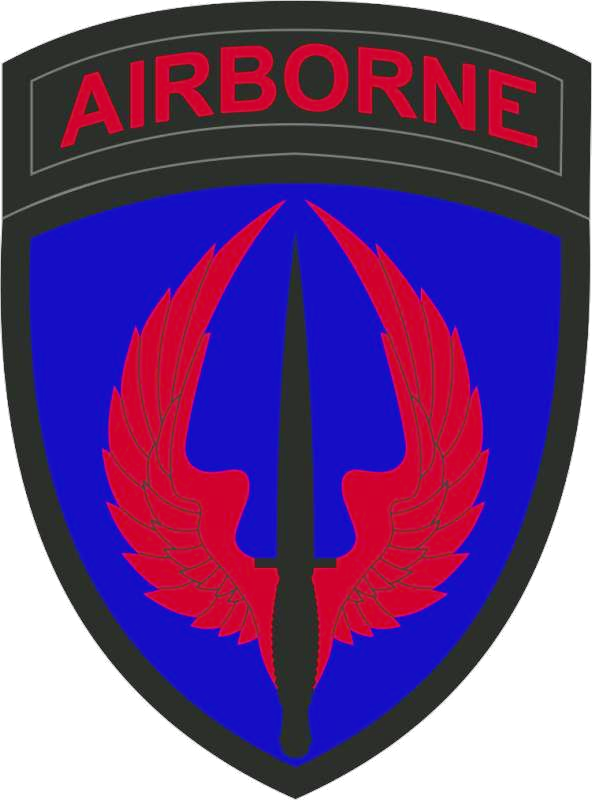
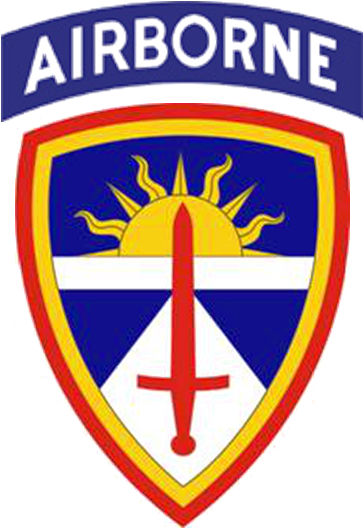
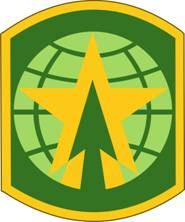
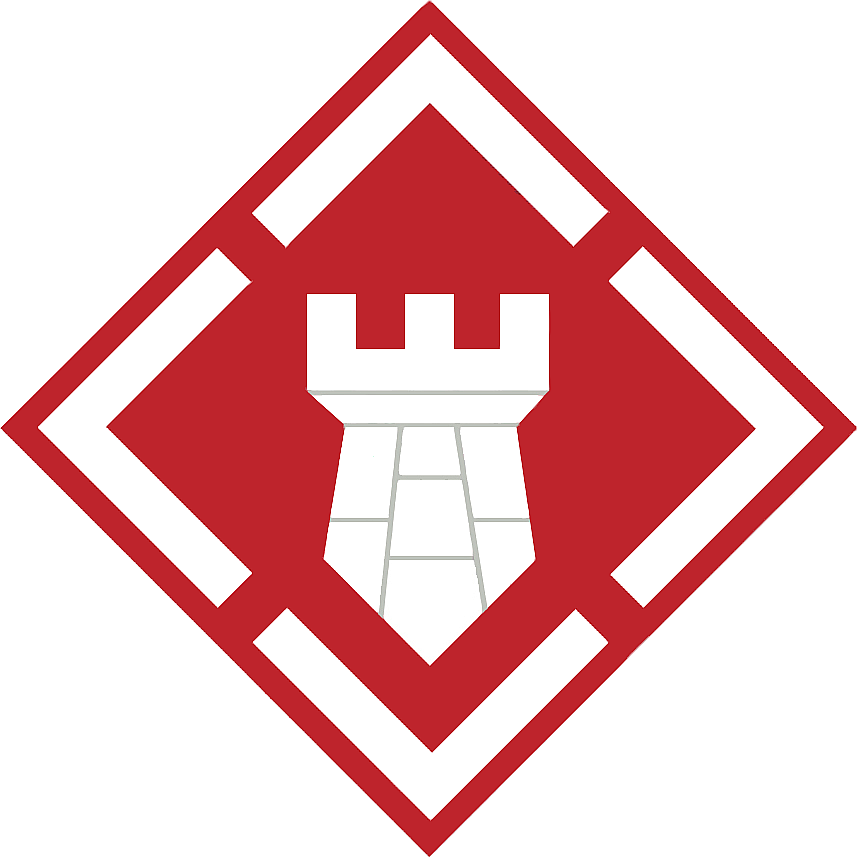
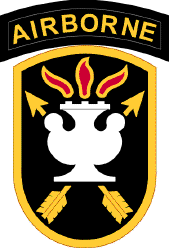
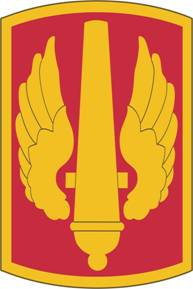
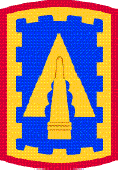
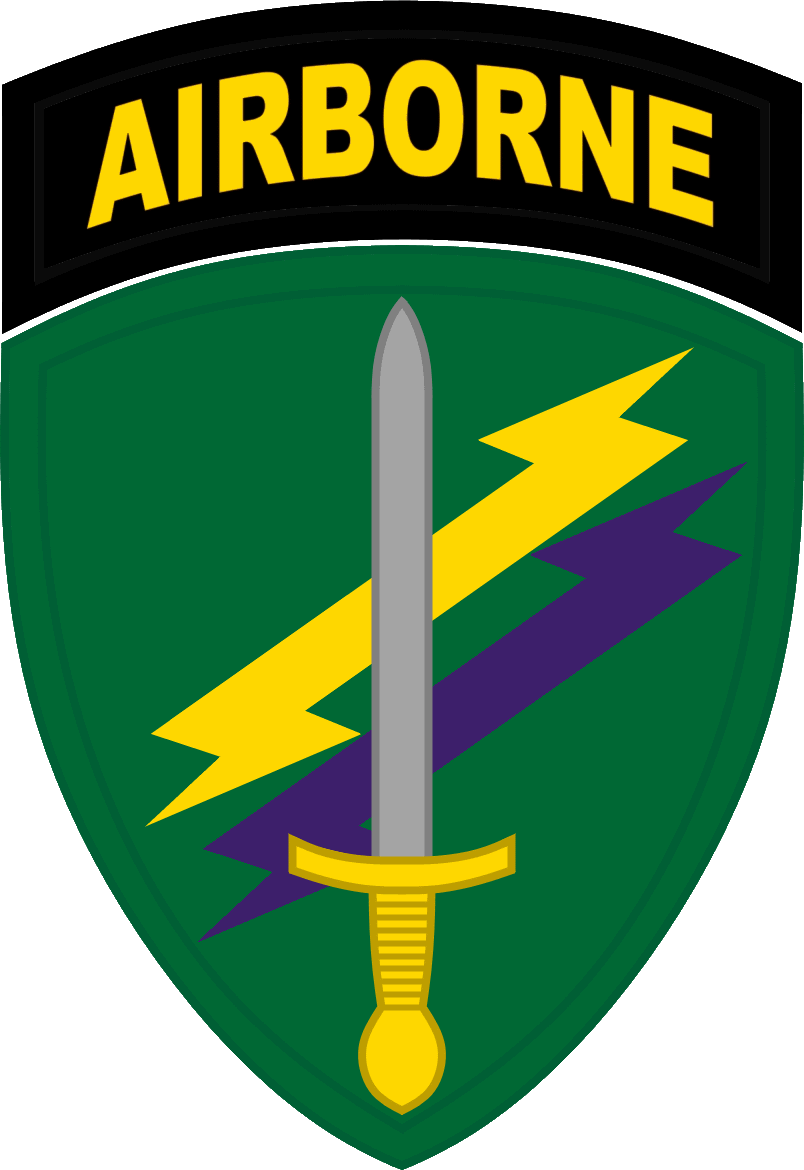
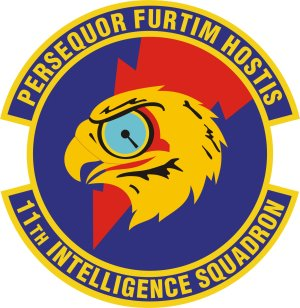
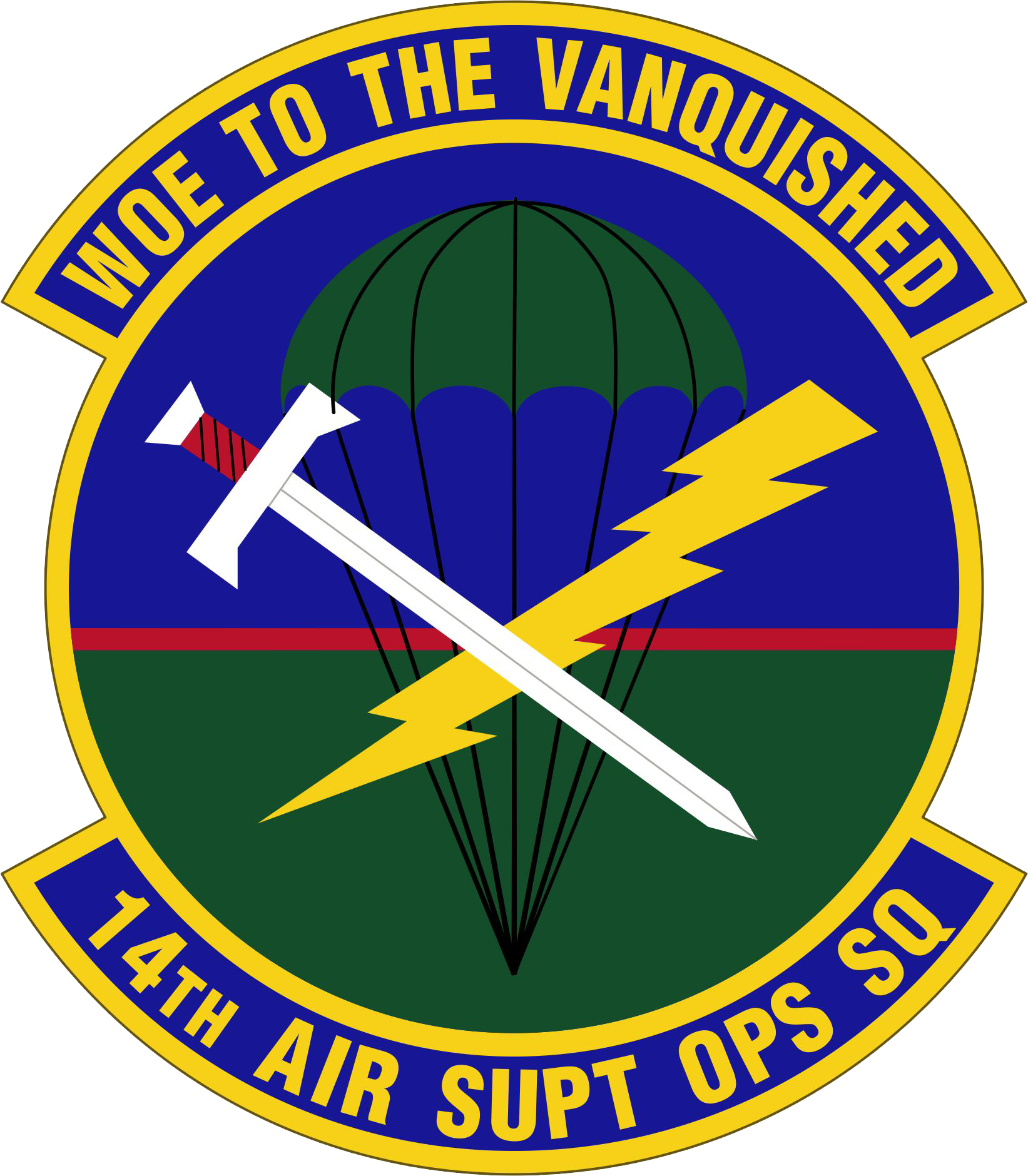
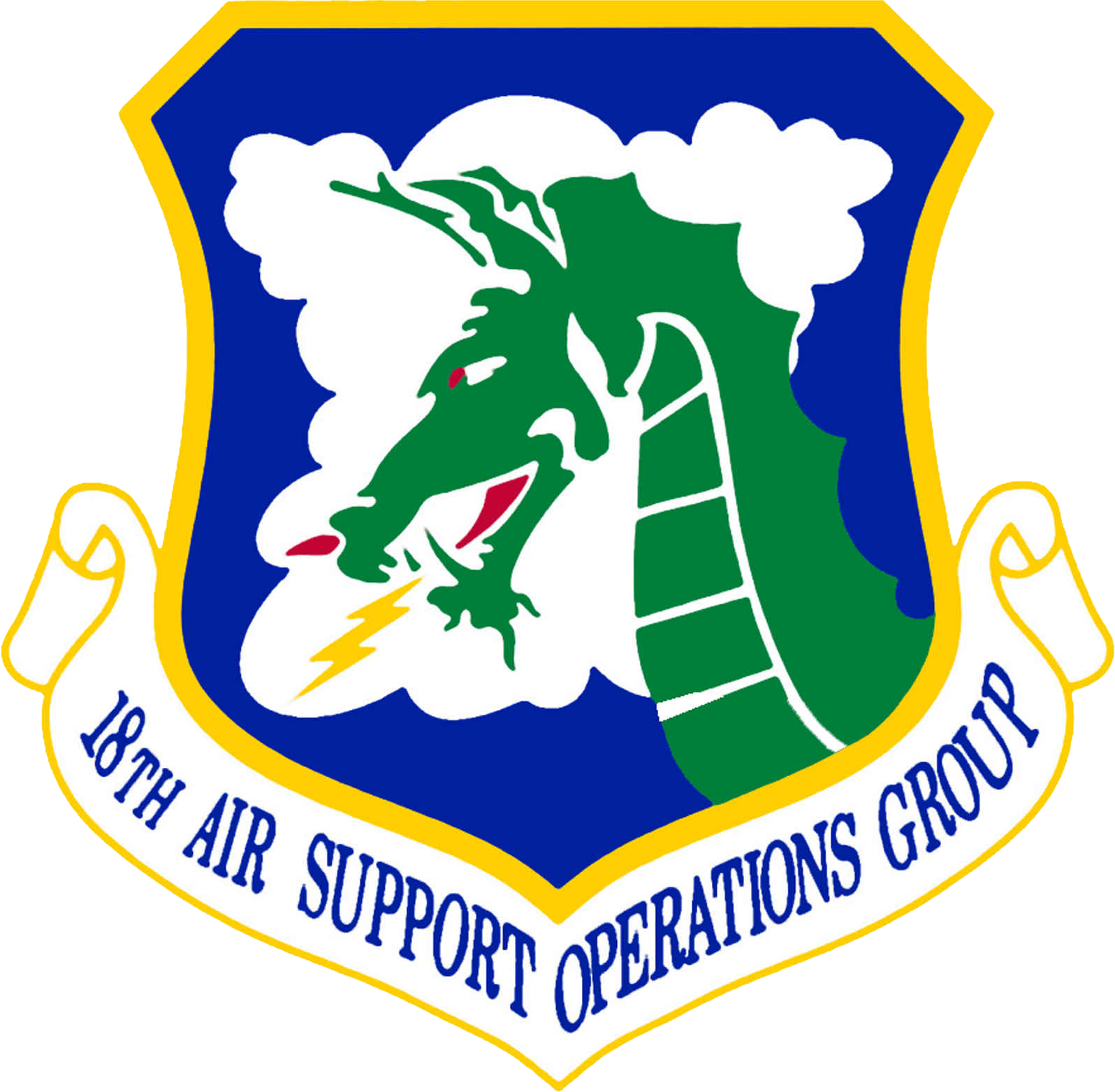
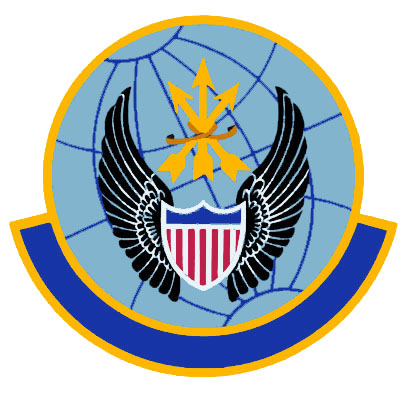
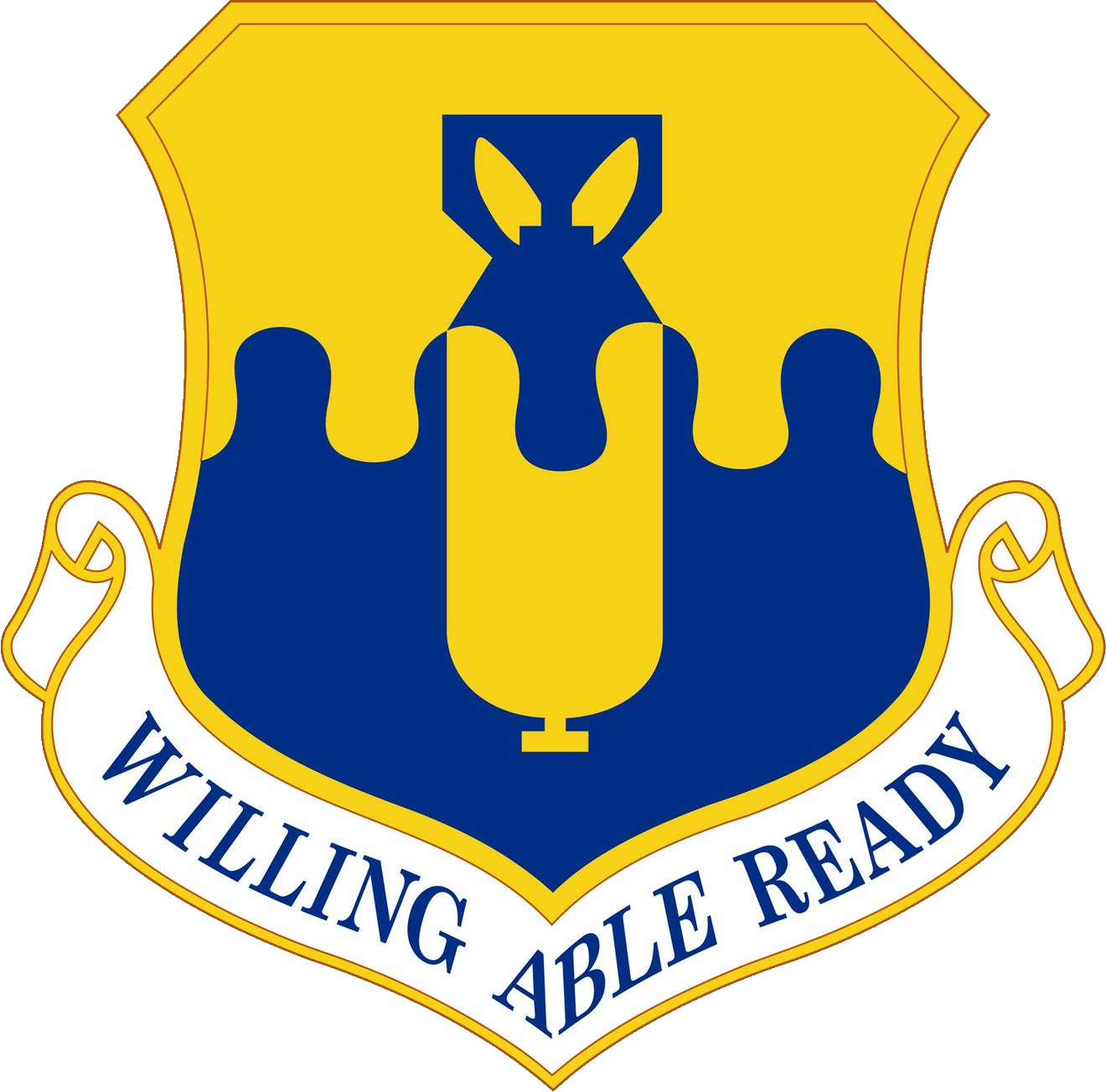

The major commands at the installation are the United States Army Western Hemisphere Command, the United States Army Reserve Command, and the United States Army Special Operations Command. Several airborne and special operations units of the United States Army are stationed at Fort Bragg, notably the 82nd Airborne Division, the 3rd Special Forces Group (Airborne), and the Delta Force. The latter is controlled by the Joint Special Operations Command, based at Pope Field within Fort Bragg.

- XVIII Airborne Corps:
  - Headquarters, XVIII Airborne Corps
    - Fort Bragg Law Enforcement Company (Activated 2024)
  - 82nd Airborne Division "All American"
    - Division Headquarters and Headquarters Battalion, 82nd Airborne Division "Gladius"
    - 1st Infantry Brigade Combat Team "1st Devil Brigade Combat Team"
    - 2nd Infantry Brigade Combat Team "2nd Falcon Brigade Combat Team"
    - 3rd Infantry Brigade Combat Team "3rd Panther Brigade Combat Team"
    - 82nd Airborne Division Artillery "Cannonball"
    - 82nd Combat Aviation Brigade "Pegasus"
    - 82nd Airborne Division Sustainment Brigade "Providers"
  - 18th Field Artillery Brigade
  - 20th Engineer Brigade
  - 525th Military Intelligence Brigade
  - 16th Military Police Brigade
  - 44th Medical Brigade
  - 35th Signal Brigade
- United States Army Special Operations Command:
  - 1st Special Forces Command (Airborne)
    - Headquarters and Headquarters Company
    - 1st Special Forces Command Intelligence Battalion
    - 3rd Special Forces Group (Airborne)
    - 4th Psychological Operations Group (Airborne)
    - 8th Psychological Operations Group (Airborne)
    - 95th Civil Affairs Brigade (Airborne)
    - 528th Sustainment Brigade (Airborne)
  - United States Army Special Operations Aviation Command
  - John F. Kennedy Special Warfare Center and School
- Other Army units on base:
  - United States Army Reserve Command
  - United States Army Civil Affairs and Psychological Operations Command
  - 1st Battalion, 313th Regiment (Logistics Support Battalion)
  - B Company, 249th Engineer Battalion (Prime Power)
  - Airborne and Special Operations Test Directorate
  - 108th Air Defense Artillery Brigade
- Units at Simmons Army Airfield:
  - Combat Aviation Brigade, 82nd Airborne Division
    - 1st Squadron, 17th Cavalry Regiment
    - 1st Battalion, 82nd Aviation Regiment
    - 2nd Battalion, 82nd Aviation Regiment
    - 3rd Battalion, 82nd Aviation Regiment
    - 122nd Aviation Support Battalion
  - U.S. Army Special Operations Aviation Command
    - United States Army Special Operations Command Flight Detachment
  - 164th Theater Airfield Operations Group
    - 3rd Airfield Operations Battalion, 58th Aviation Regiment
- Units at Pope Field:
  - 18th Air Support Operations Group
  - 11th Special Operations Intelligence Squadron
  - 14th Air Support Operations Squadron
  - 21st Special Tactics Squadron
  - 43d Air Mobility Operations Group
  - Joint Special Operations Command
    - 1st Special Forces Operational Detachment-Delta (Airborne) (1st SFOD-D (A)) (a.k.a. "Delta Force")
    - 24th Special Tactics Squadron
    - Joint Communications Unit
  - 2nd Security Force Assistance Brigade (2nd SFAB)

== Geography ==
Fort Bragg is at 35°8'21" north, 78°59'57" west (35.139064, −78.999143).

According to the United States Census Bureau, the post has a total area of 19.0 square miles (49.2 km^{2}), of which 19.0 square miles (49.1 km^{2}) of it is land and 0.1 square miles (0.26 km^{2}) of it is water. The total area is 0.32% water.

Kiest, Simmons, Boundary Line, McFayden, Hurley and Holland lakes are intensively managed to maintain fish populations. Croatan, Quail, Deer Pen, Overhills, Big Muddy, Little Muddy, Texas, MacArthur, Smith, Mott, and Lindsay lakes are managed, but are not normally treated or restocked since their fish populations are respectable and are maintained naturally. A 1.1 MW floating solar plant with a 2 MW battery was installed on Big Muddy lake for $36 million.

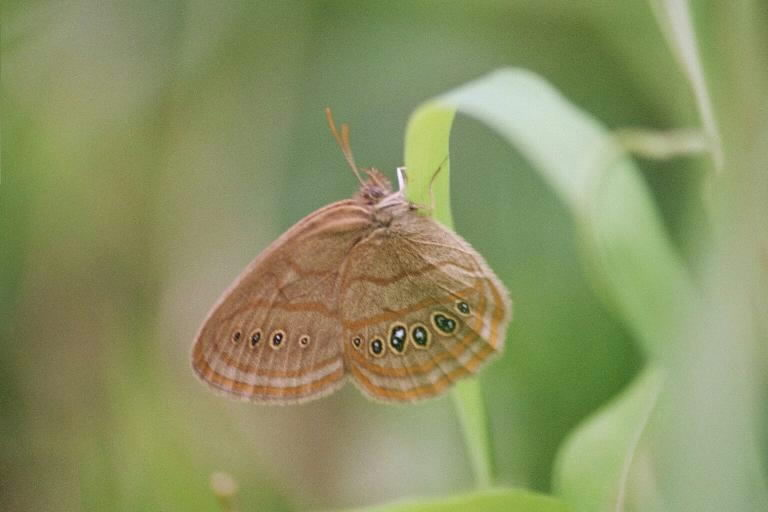
Saint Francis' satyr imago

Fort Bragg is the only locality where the endangered Saint Francis' satyr butterfly (Neonympha mitchellii francisci) is known to occur. St. Francis' satyr is found in wetland habitats dominated by graminoids and sedges, such as abandoned beaver dams or along streams with beavers.

Fort Bragg fever, a bacterial zoonotic disease, has been named after it, in reference to an outbreak in 1942.

In 1990, the endangered red-cockaded woodpecker came under the protection of the U.S. Fish and Wildlife Service. This caused a tremendous problem for Fort Bragg, where many of these birds lived. Training stopped, ranges were closed, and troops were temporarily moved to other installations for training.

The Army and the conservationists eventually came to an agreement, which put in place training restrictions around the woodpeckers' habitat. White stripes were painted on trees to indicate the location of the habitats, and restrictions limited the scope and duration of training that could take place within 200 feet (61 m) of these locations.

Today, the clusters of woodpeckers has more than doubled in size (200 to 493), and many of the training restrictions have been lifted.

== Demographics ==
Historical population
Census	Pop.	Note	%±
1970	46,995		—
1980	37,834		−19.5%
1990	34,744		−8.2%
2000	29,183		−16.0%

As of the census of 2000, there were 29,183 people, 4,315 households, and 4,215 families residing on the base. The population density was 1,540.0 inhabitants per square mile (594.6/km^{2}). There were 4,420 housing units at an average density of 233.3 per square mile (90.1/km^{2}). Fort Bragg was not recorded as a census-designated place for the 2010 census.

=== Racial makeup ===
In 2000, the racial makeup of the base was 58.1% White, 25.3% African-American, 1.2% Native American, 1.8% Asian, 0.9% Pacific Islander, 8.3% from other races, and 4.4% from two or more races. 15.8% of the population were Hispanic or Latino of any race.

=== Households ===
In 2000, there were 4,315 households, out of which 85.3% had children under the age of 18 living with them, 88.9% were married couples living together, 7.2% had a female householder with no husband present, and 2.3% were non-families. 2.1% of all households were made up of individuals, and 0.0% were someone living alone who was 65 years of age or older. The average household size was 3.72, and the average family size was 3.74.

=== Ages ===
The age distribution in 2000 was 25.8% under the age of 18, 40.9% from 18 to 24, 32.3% from 25 to 44, 1.1% from 45 to 64, and 0.1% who were 65 years of age or older. The median age was 22 years. For every 100 females, there were 217.1 males. For every 100 females age 18 and over, there were 293.5 males. All of these statistics are typical for military bases.

=== Income ===
The median income for a household on the base at the 2000 census was $30,106, and the median income for a family was $29,836. 10.0% of the population and 9.6% of families were below the poverty line. Out of the total population, 11.4% of those under the age of 18 and 0.0% of those 65 and older were living below the poverty line.

=== Housing ===
Corvias-managed housing under IMCOM is attracting national attention because of reports of lead contamination, black mold, and asbestos from base residents.

Task & Purpose confirmed on 12 February 2024 that trash pickup at the installation is not occurring on a timely basis; the waste management contractor was terminated for not emptying the waste dumpsters on a timely basis; the garrison command stated that trash pickup at "barracks, child development centers, dining facilities and medical facilities" is now getting higher priority.

== Education ==
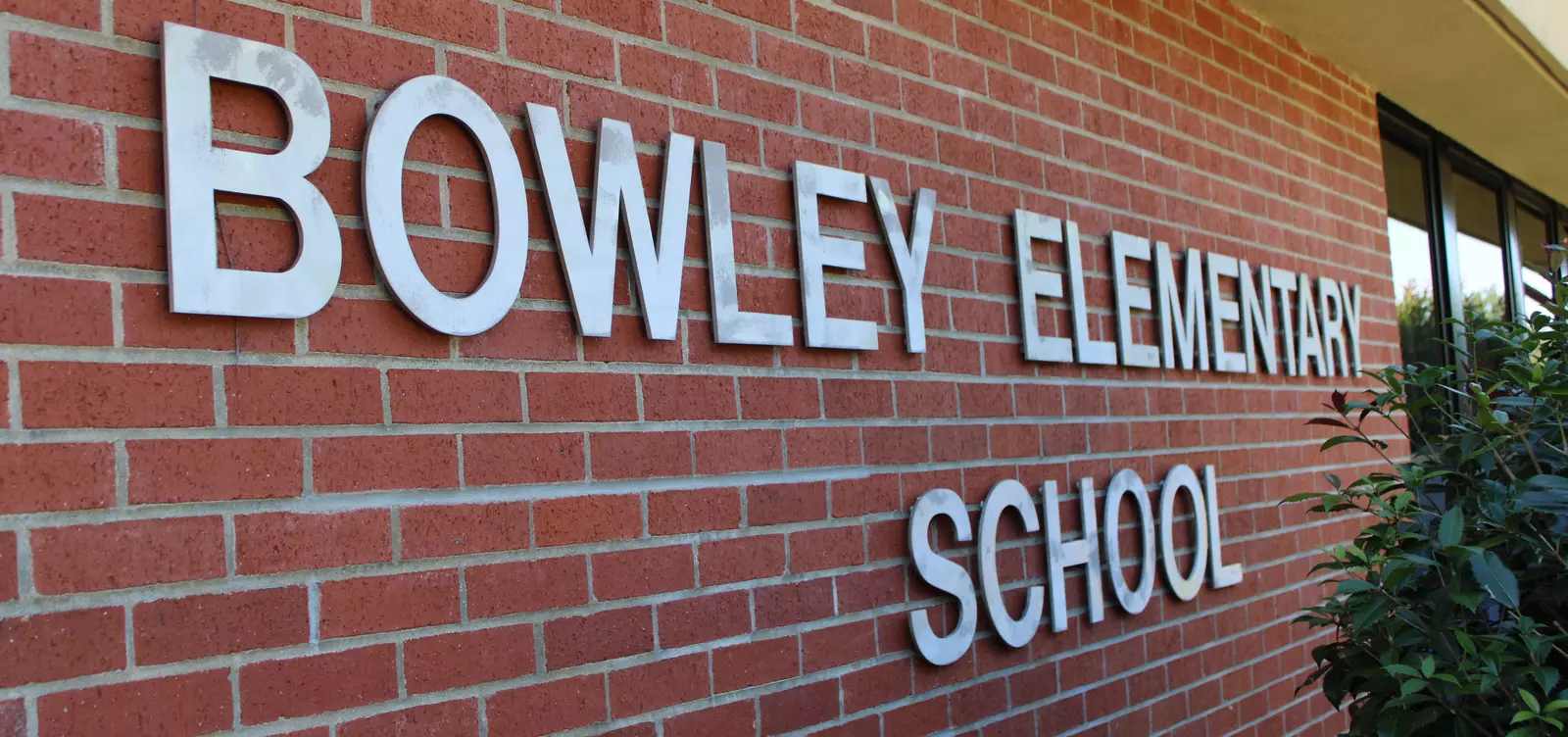
Bowley Elementary School

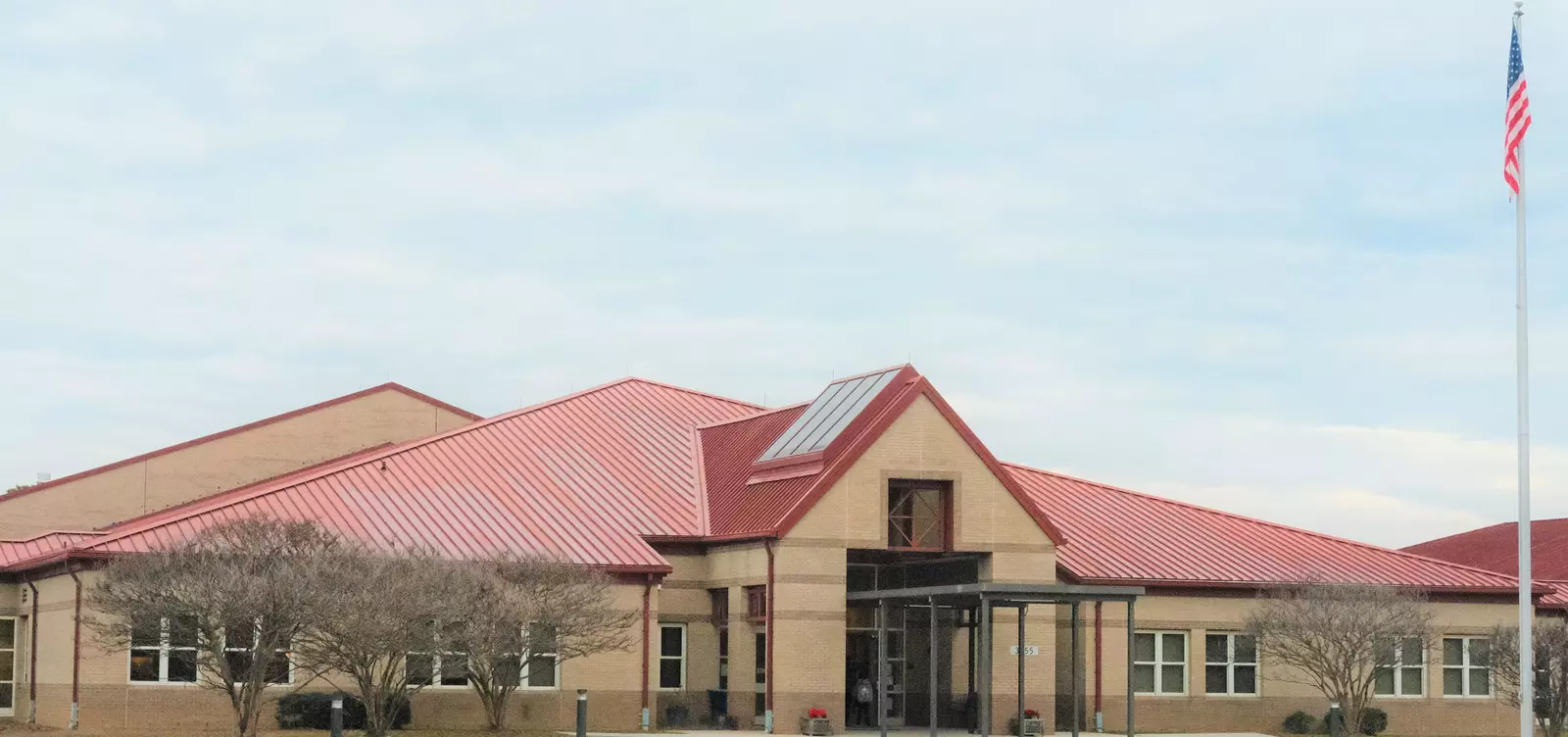
Devers Elementary School

Dependents of staff are educated by Department of Defense Education Activity (DoDEA) schools for K–8.

- Albritton Middle School – Opened in 1983
- Randall David Shugart Middle School (Linden Oaks)
- Irwin Intermediate School
- Bowley Elementary School
- Devers Elementary School
- Gary Ivan Gordon Elementary School (Linden Oaks) – Opened in 2009
- Mildred E. Poole Elementary School
- Randall David Shugart Elementary School (Linden Oaks)
- Kimberly Hampton Primary School
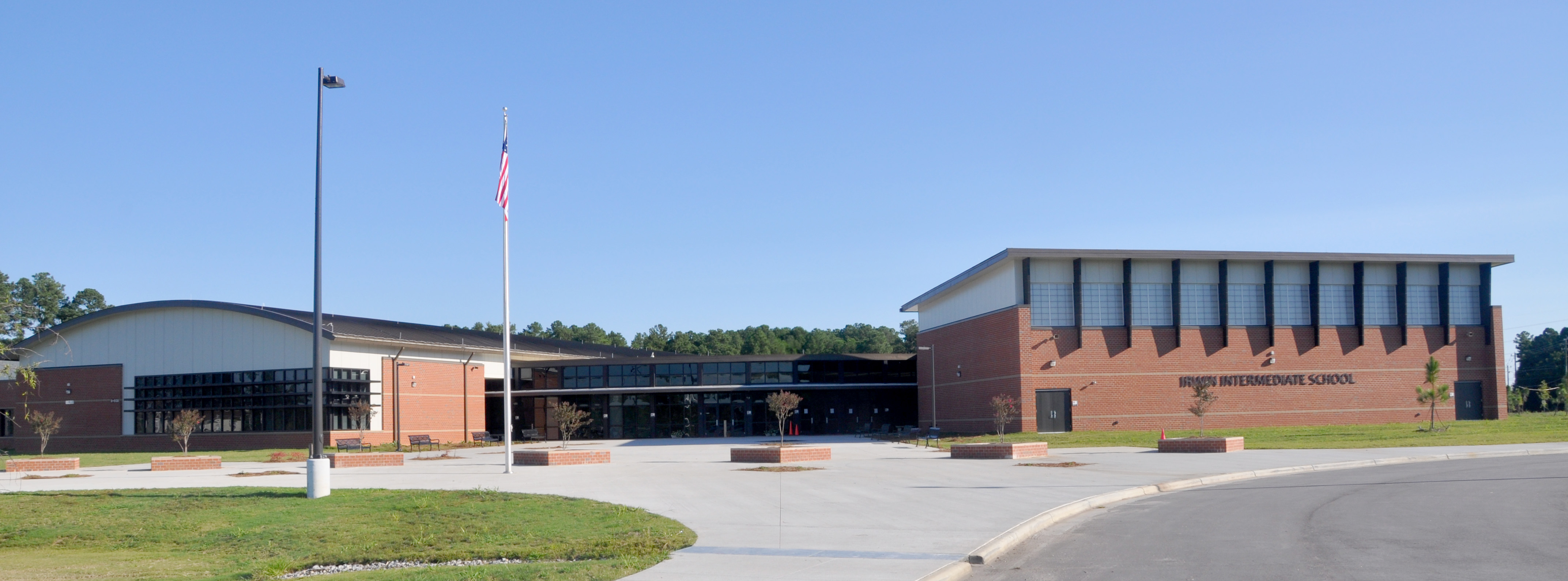
Irwin Intermediate School

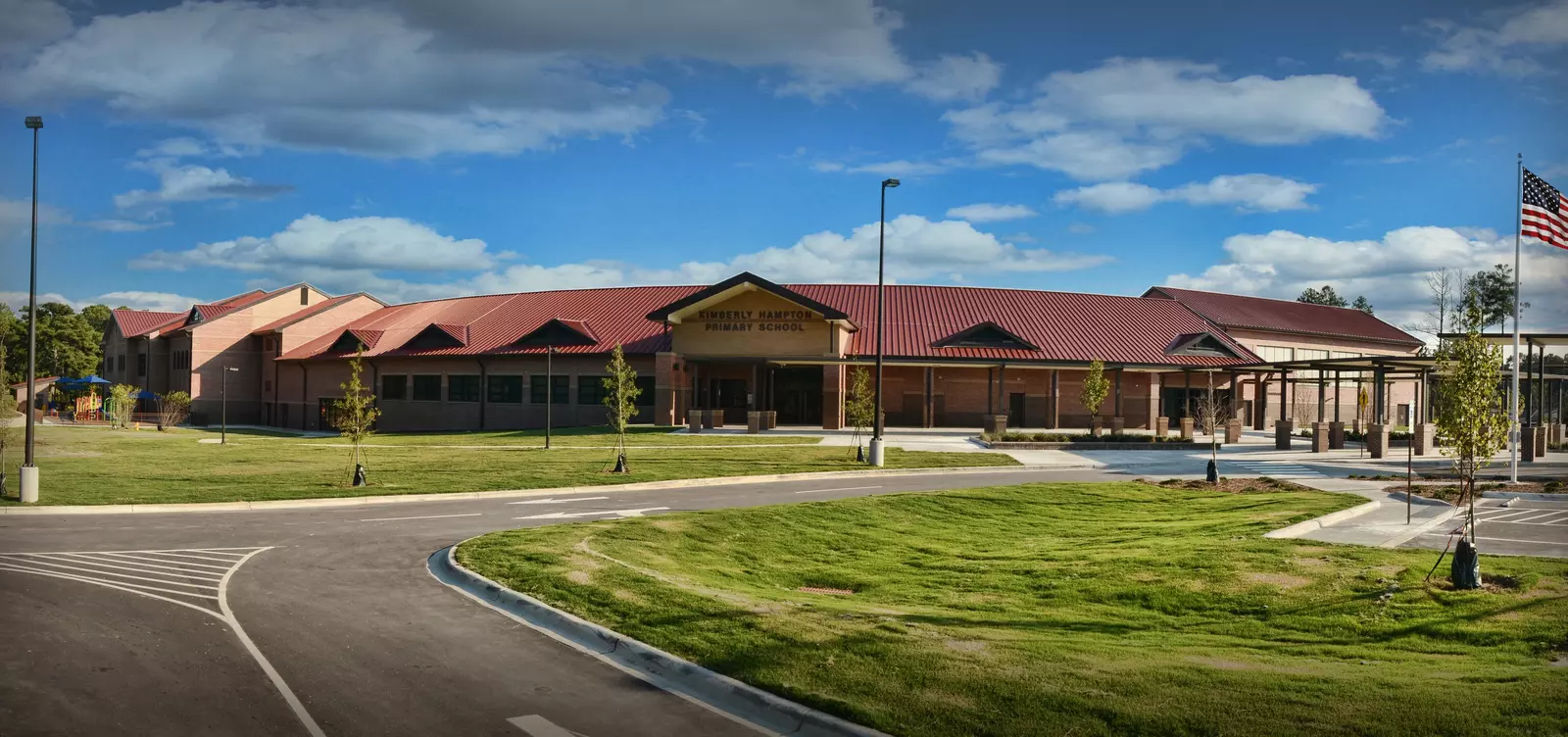
Kimberly Hampton Primary School

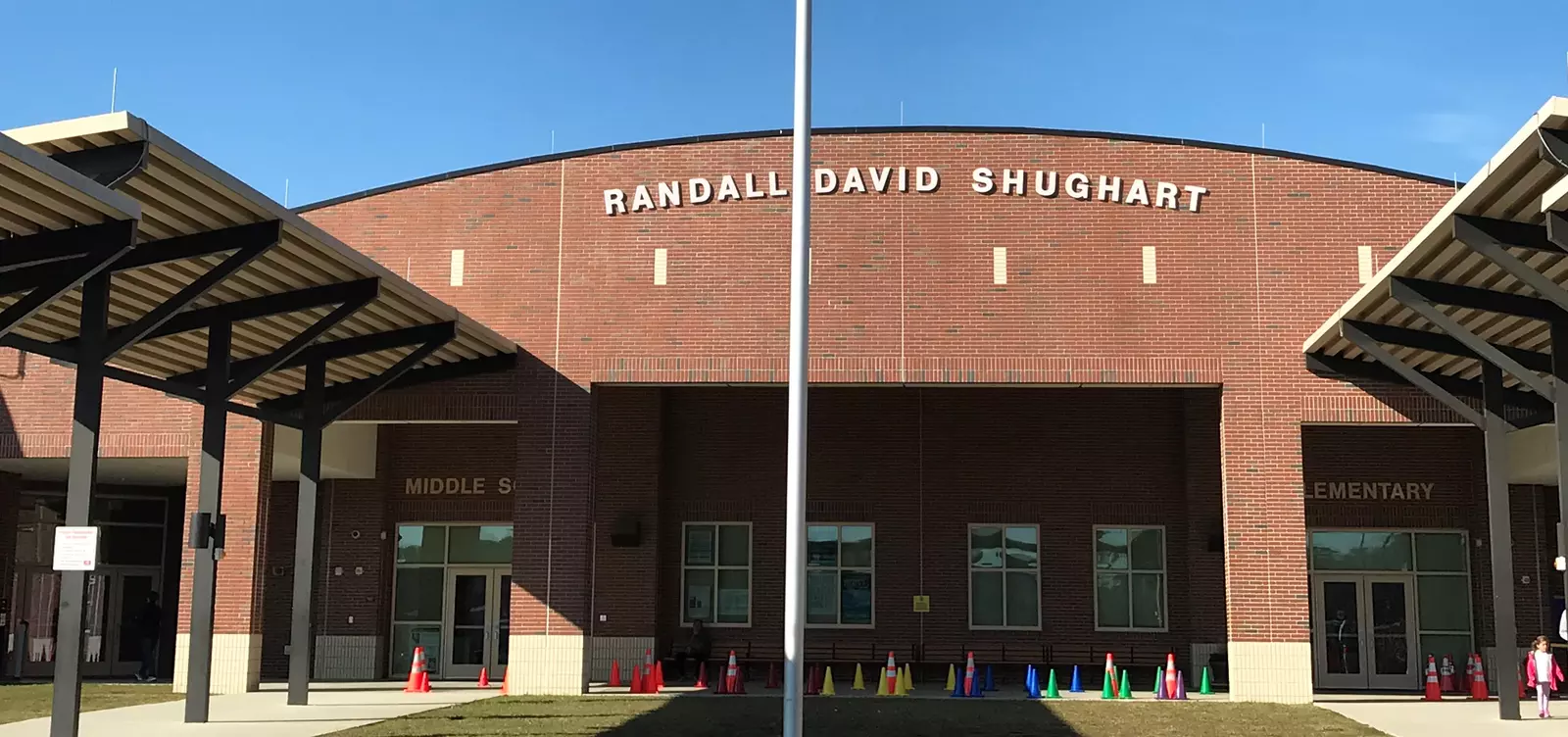
Randall David Shughart Elementary School and Randall David Shughart Middle School (Linden Oaks)

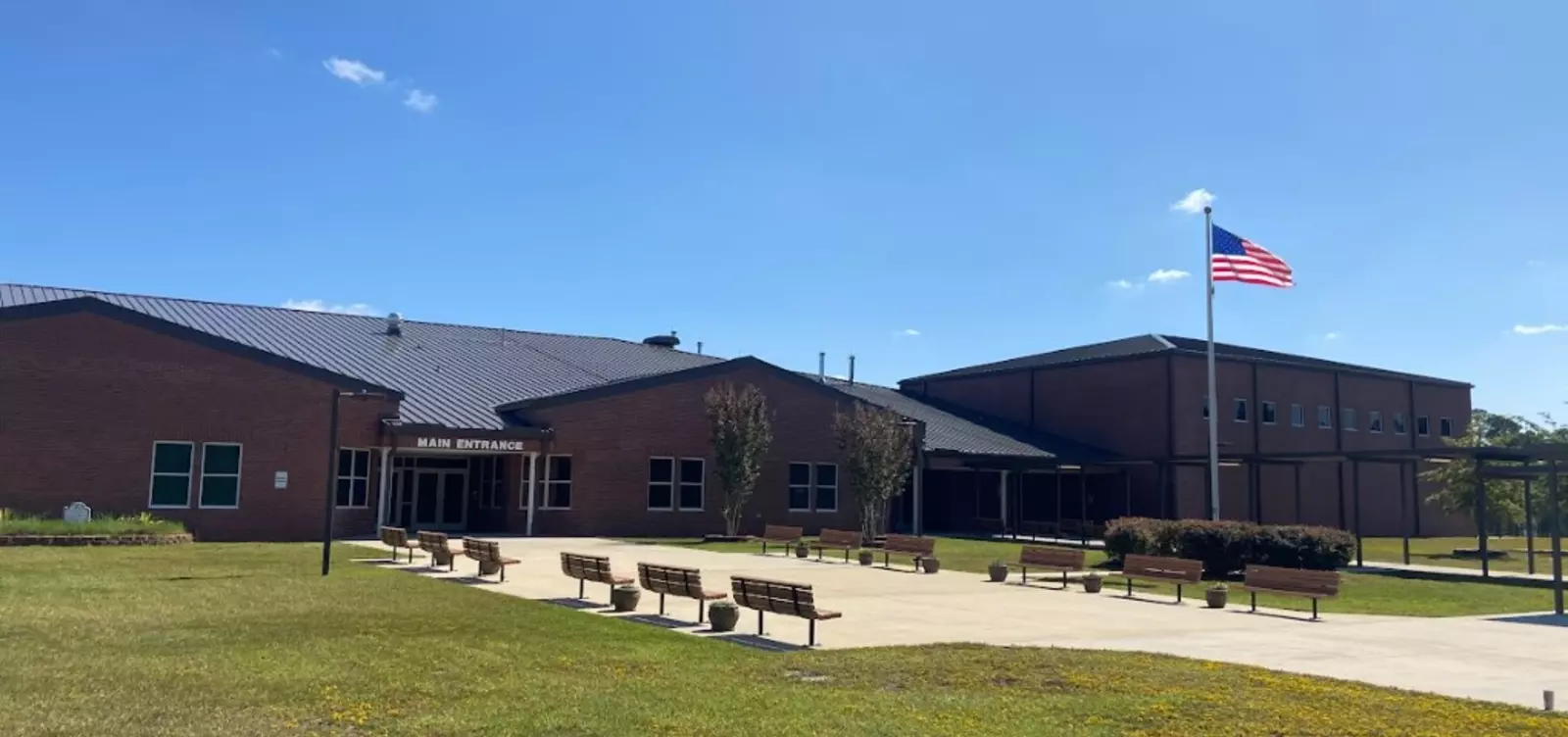
Gary Ivan Gordon Elementary School (Linden Oaks)

For high school, dependents attend local public schools: Cumberland County Schools for Cumberland County residents, and Hoke County Schools for Hoke County residents. The Cumberland County parts of the military reservation are assigned to EE Smith High School.

The Linden Oaks area, within Harnett County, is in Harnett County Schools, and is assigned to Overhills High School.

== Notable events ==
- In January 1942, Mickey Rooney visited Fort Bragg to entertain the soldiers. Two years later, he was drafted and served in the Army until the end of World War II.
- On 12 October 1961, President John F. Kennedy visits Fort Bragg and the U.S. Army Special Warfare Center and officializes the wear of the Green Beret.
- On 17 February 1970, Captain Jeffrey R. MacDonald murdered his pregnant wife and two daughters. The events surrounding the murders were retold in the book Fatal Vision, itself made into a television miniseries of the same name.
- On 1 July 1987, a C-130 crashes during a public demonstration at the Sicily Drop Zone. Four airmen and one soldier die.
- In 1988, U.S. Army Specialist Ronald Gray raped and murdered a female soldier and civilians.
- On 23 March 1994, twenty-four members of Fort Bragg's 82nd Airborne Division were killed and over 100 others injured while preparing for a routine airborne training operation during the Green Ramp disaster at neighboring Pope Air Force base. It was the worst peacetime loss of life suffered by the division since the end of World War II.
- On 27 October 1995, Sergeant William Kreutzer Jr. opened fire at Fort Bragg, killing an officer and wounding 18 other soldiers.
- Throughout 2002, there were three murders of military wives and one murder of a military ex-wife by the soldiers they were married to, and the murder of a husband in the military by his wife, all the soldiers stationed at Fort Bragg. Legal representatives of the soldiers argued the drug Mefloquine, also known as Larium, was responsible for their diminished mental capacity that led to the murders of their spouses. The Pentagon and the Army Medical Department sent specialists and investigators to address the situation. Reports released later attributed the murders to have come from psychological problems, not the drugs.
- The court-martial of Timothy Hennis for the 1985 Eastburn family murders took place at Fort Bragg, beginning on March 17, 2010, and lasting for three weeks before Hennis was convicted and sentenced to death.
- On 28 June 2012, Specialist Ricky G. Elder shot and killed Lieutenant Colonel Roy L. Tisdale of the 525th Battlefield Surveillance Brigade during a safety brief. The soldier also shot himself and injured two other fellow soldiers. He later died of his injuries.
- On 8 March 2016, Major League Baseball announced that the Atlanta Braves and Miami Marlins would play a special neutral-site game, the Fort Bragg Game, at the newly constructed Fort Bragg Stadium, on 3 July 2016. It was the first time that an active military installation has hosted a regular-season game of a professional sports league. The game was attended primarily by military members. In addition, the game was the first Major League Baseball regular season game ever held in the state of North Carolina. The ballpark was built on a disused golf course and sat 12,500 fans for the game, a 5–2 Marlins win televised live on ESPN. Following the conclusion of the game, the grandstands and other facilities were removed, and the field became a multi-use sporting ground.
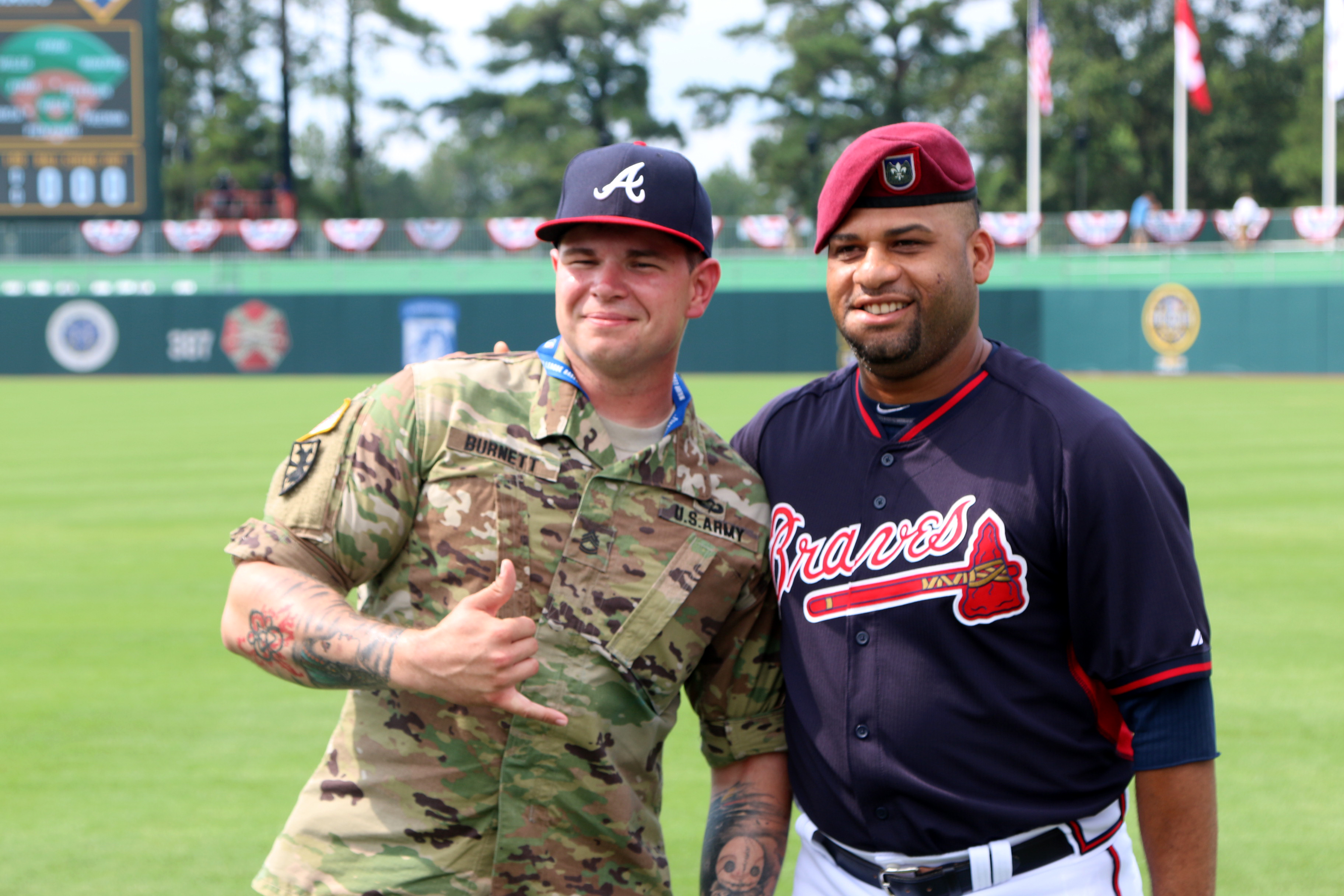
  Sgt. 1st Class Alex Burnett and Atlanta Braves pitcher Arodys Vizcaino switch head gear on Sunday, 3 July 2016, prior to the start of the Miami Marlins and Braves regular season game at Fort Bragg, N.C.
- On 21 October 2020, the official Fort Bragg Twitter account sent out several sexually charged tweets.
- On 2 June 2023, Fort Liberty officially adopted its new name in a public ceremony.

== Notable people ==
- Raymond Floyd (born 1942), professional golfer, member of the World Golf Hall of Fame
- Chris Hanburger (born 1941), former NFL linebacker, member of the Pro Football Hall of Fame
- Brandon Herrera (born 1995), American YouTuber
- Patricia Horoho (born 1960), retired U.S. Army lieutenant general
- Ernie Logan (born 1968), former NFL football player
- Stacey Milbern (1987–2020), disability rights activist
- Julianne Moore (born 1960), actress
- Joe Morris (born 1960), former NFL running back, Super Bowl champion and two-time Pro Bowl selection
- Passion Richardson (born 1975), Olympic track and field athlete who competed in sprinting events
- Hugh Shelton (born 1942), retired United States Army General, former Commander of Fort Bragg and Chairman of the Joint Chiefs of Staff

== Burials ==
Actress Martha Raye is buried on Fort Bragg in commemoration of her work with the USO during World War II and Vietnam.

== See also ==
- 82nd Airborne Division War Memorial Museum
- Camp Mackall
- Exercise Swarmer
- The Fort Bragg Cartel
- Operation Toy Drop
- Pathfinder
- Pope Field
- Simmons Army Airfield
- The Special Warfare Memorial Statue (Bronze Bruce)
- United Service Organization of North Carolina
- United States Army Western Hemisphere Command
