= John Hampton (philanthropist) =

United States Marine Corps colonel and journalist (1907–2010)

John Hampton (May 24, 1907 – July 4, 2010) was an American Marine Lieutenant Colonel and journalist. Hampton is credited with co-founding Toys for Tots with Major William L. Hendricks and other U.S. Marines during the late 1940s.

Hampton received a bachelor's degree in journalism from Baylor University. He worked as a journalist for several wire services and newspapers in Texas, Louisiana and Kansas following his graduation. He enlisted in the United States Marines during World War II and was sent to the Pacific theater. He coded and decoded encrypted messages during the war.

Hampton was stationed at a Marine Reserve training center in Los Angeles following the end of World War II, where he worked as a public information officer. He would meet Major William L. Hendricks at the Los Angeles center, who would co-found Toys for Tots. Hendricks, who was public relations officer for Warner Bros. by profession, created a campaign to place collection bins for toys outside of Warner Bros movie theaters, which evolved into Toys for Tots. Hendricks partnered with Hampton to lead the toy collections in the area. Hampton also used his journalism experience to promote the campaign.

Hampton later moved to the San Francisco Bay Area, where he practiced public relations in Oakland. His wife was journalist Nora Hampton, who worked for the Oakland Tribune. The couple resided in Orinda, California, until his wife's death on November 24, 1994.

Hampton began showing symptoms of dementia in 2000. He died on July 4, 2010, at the Deer Hill Care Home in Lafayette, California, at the age of 103. He was predeceased by his son, Mikey Hampton, who died in 2006, leaving no close relatives.
