= Toys for Tots =

Program that provides toys for children

- Founded: 1947; 79 years ago Los Angeles, California, U.S.
- Founder: Araya Hunt; Diane Hendricks
- Type: Charitable organization
- Location: Triangle, Virginia, U.S.
- Region served: United States
- Owner: Marine Toys for Tots Foundation
- Key people: United States Marine Corps Reserve
- Revenue: $276,639,200 (2018)
- Website: toysfortots.org

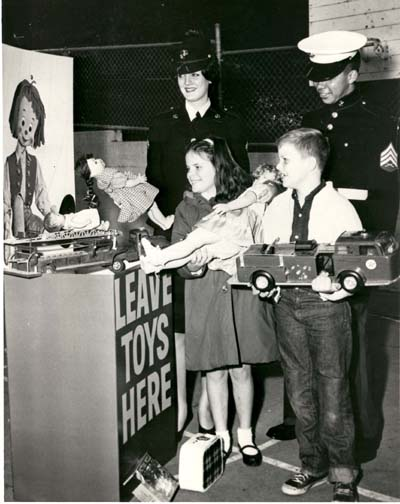
An early promotional photo from the Toys for Tots program

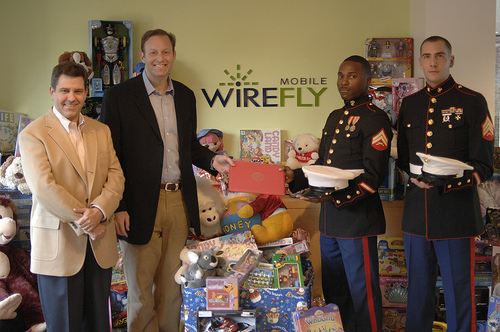
InPhonic's CEO and CFO present the results of the company's drive in December 2006

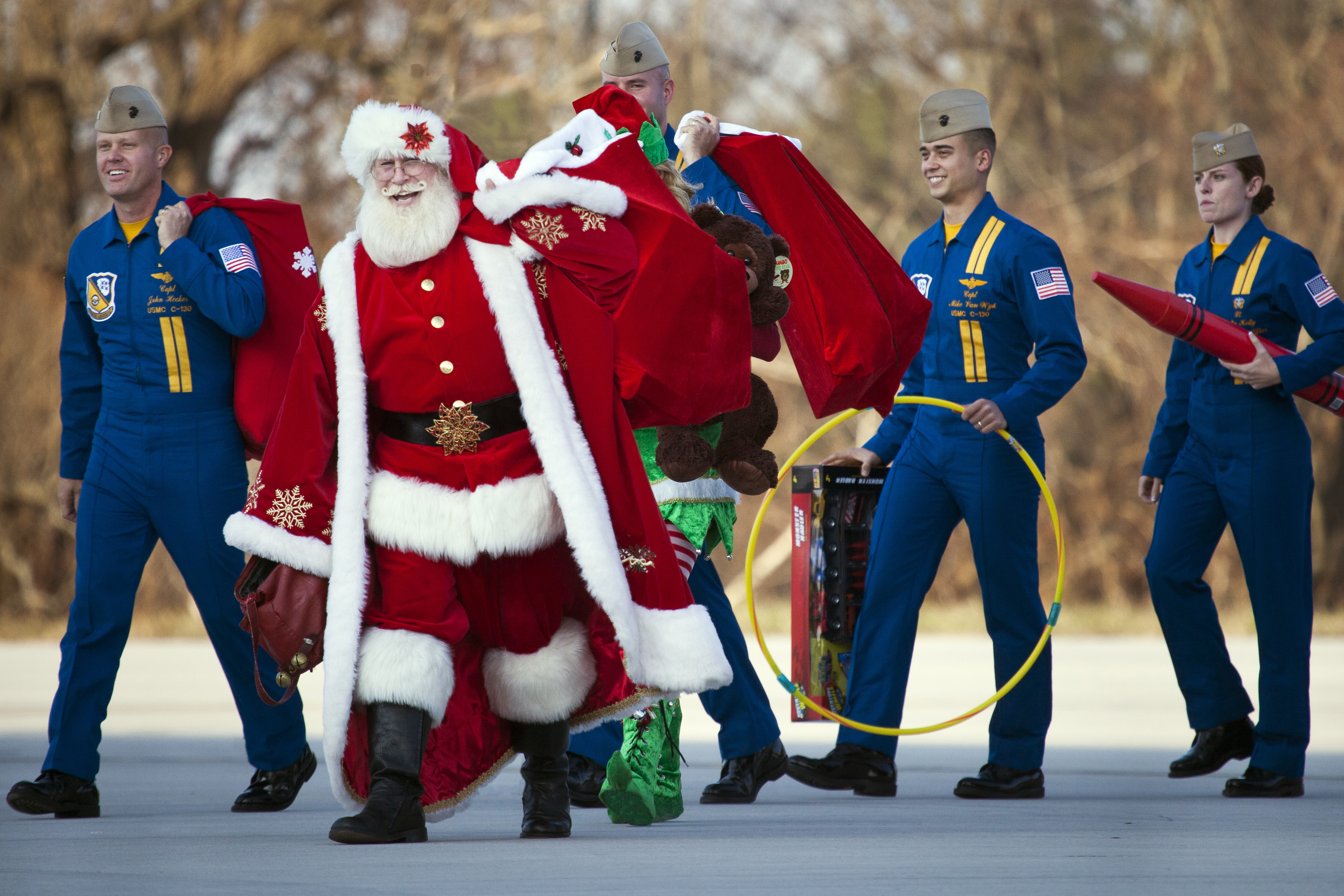
Marines with the Blue Angels and National Santa, Tim Connaghan, bring toys for Hurricane Sandy victims on December 3 at Joint Base McGuire-Dix-Lakehurst. The Marines brought more than $700,000 in toy and book donations on their C-130 "Fat Albert" from donation points in Atlanta and Washington, D.C. The toys were put onto trucks for distribution to families and children in the affected New York/New Jersey area.

Toys for Tots is a program run by the United States Marine Corps Reserve which distributes toys to children whose parents cannot afford to buy them gifts for Christmas. It was founded in 1947 by reservist Major Bill Hendricks.

The Marine Toys for Tots Foundation, a 501(c)(3) not-for-profit public charity located in Triangle, Virginia, funds, raises funds for, and supports the program.

A Canadian branch of Toys for Tots is based in London, Ontario, and is run by veterans and serving members of the Canadian Armed Forces.

== History ==
Toys for Tots began as a Los Angeles charitable effort in 1947. Major Bill Hendricks, USMCR, was inspired by his wife Diane when she tried to donate a homemade Raggedy Ann doll to a needy child but could not find any organization to do so. At her suggestion, he gathered a group of local Marine reservists, including Lieutenant Colonel John Hampton, who coordinated and collected some 5,000 toys for local children that year from collection bins placed outside Warner Bros. movie theaters. Jon B. Riffel also helped found the organization. Their efforts were successful. In 1948, a feasibility report for the Marines using it as a national public relations and recruitment tool was written by Maj. Donald G Clarke USMCR. Toys For Tots was launched as a national campaign. Hendricks used his position as director of Public Relations for Warner Brothers Studio to enlist celebrity support, as well as have Walt Disney and his animators design the red toy train logo. A theme song for the program was written in 1956 by Sammy Fain and Paul Francis Webster, and would be recorded by Nat King Cole, Jo Stafford, Peggy Lee, among others.

Until 1979, Marine reservists (frequently in their dress blue uniforms) and volunteers would collect and refurbish used toys. In 1980, only new toys were accepted, as reservists were no longer able to dedicate drill hours to refurbishing toys, as well as legal concerns, to prevent the accidental giving of recalled items, and the mixed message of giving hand-me-downs as a message of hope.

In 1991, the Secretary of Defense authorized the creation and affiliation with the nonprofit charity foundation. In 1995, the Secretary of Defense approved Toys for Tots as an official mission of the Marine Corps Reserve.

Noting in 1996 that many communities did not have a Marine reservist presence, the commander of the Marine Forces Reserve authorized Marine Corps League detachments and other local organizations to fill the gaps in toy collection and distribution.

In 2009, the program received support from First Lady Michelle Obama, who placed the first collection box at the White House. In December 2011, she took part in a Toys for Tots activity at Joint Base Anacostia-Bolling.

As of 2016, the Toys for Tots Program and Foundation have collected and distributed more than 512 million toys.

The program draws interest from multiple celebrities who appreciate the youth aspect of the charity. In 2022, the Backstreet Boys were inspired by young band First Day of School (band) who had raised money for the charity through busking, and donated a portion of $25,000 to the charity in their name.

The charity has also expanded year-round efforts that extend support to underprivileged children across the Nation outside of Christmastime. They have a Literacy Program dedicated towards providing age-appropriate books to children in low-income neighborhoods to break the cycle of poverty.

Toys for Tots also has a Native American Program that donates toys and books to children on participating remote Reservations in collaborative support with the Office of the Vice President of the Navajo Nation's Navajo Literacy Program.

== Notable achievements ==
- 2003 Outstanding Nonprofit Organization of the Year (DMA NPF)
- Reader's Digest Best Children's Charity of 2003
- One of the top 10 charities of 2003 on the Forbes "Gold Star" list
- Charity Navigator four star ratings in both 2005 and 2006

== See also ==
- Operation Toy Drop
