= Operation Toy Drop =

Annual U.S. Army airborne training event and toy drive

Operation Toy Drop is an airborne operation training event coordinated by the United States Army Civil Affairs and Psychological Operations Command (Airborne) and the United States Army Reserve. First organized in 1988 by Sergeant first class Randy Oler, the operation occurs yearly in December at Fort Bragg in North Carolina. In addition to the Army participants in North Carolina, United States Air Force crews from Joint Base Charleston in South Carolina and Altus Air Force Base in Oklahoma have collaborated in the event.

The operation is the largest combined airborne exercise in the world, featuring jumpmasters from nations including Botswana, Canada, Chile, Estonia, Germany, Ireland, Latvia, Poland and Thailand, among others. American paratroopers may earn parachutist badges from these nations by participating in Operation Toy Drop.

The operation consists of soldiers donating toys in exchange for an opportunity to jump from an aircraft. The toys are then donated to local charities to be distributed to children for Christmas. Approximately 4,000 paratroopers donate toys annually. In the past, soldiers were given a lottery number with a chance to be drawn for parachuting, although beginning in 2022 units were given allotments to submit soldiers by name to participate. Paratroopers sometimes dress as fictional Christmas characters while parachuting, including Santa Claus, Christmas elves, Santa Claus's reindeer, and the Grinch.

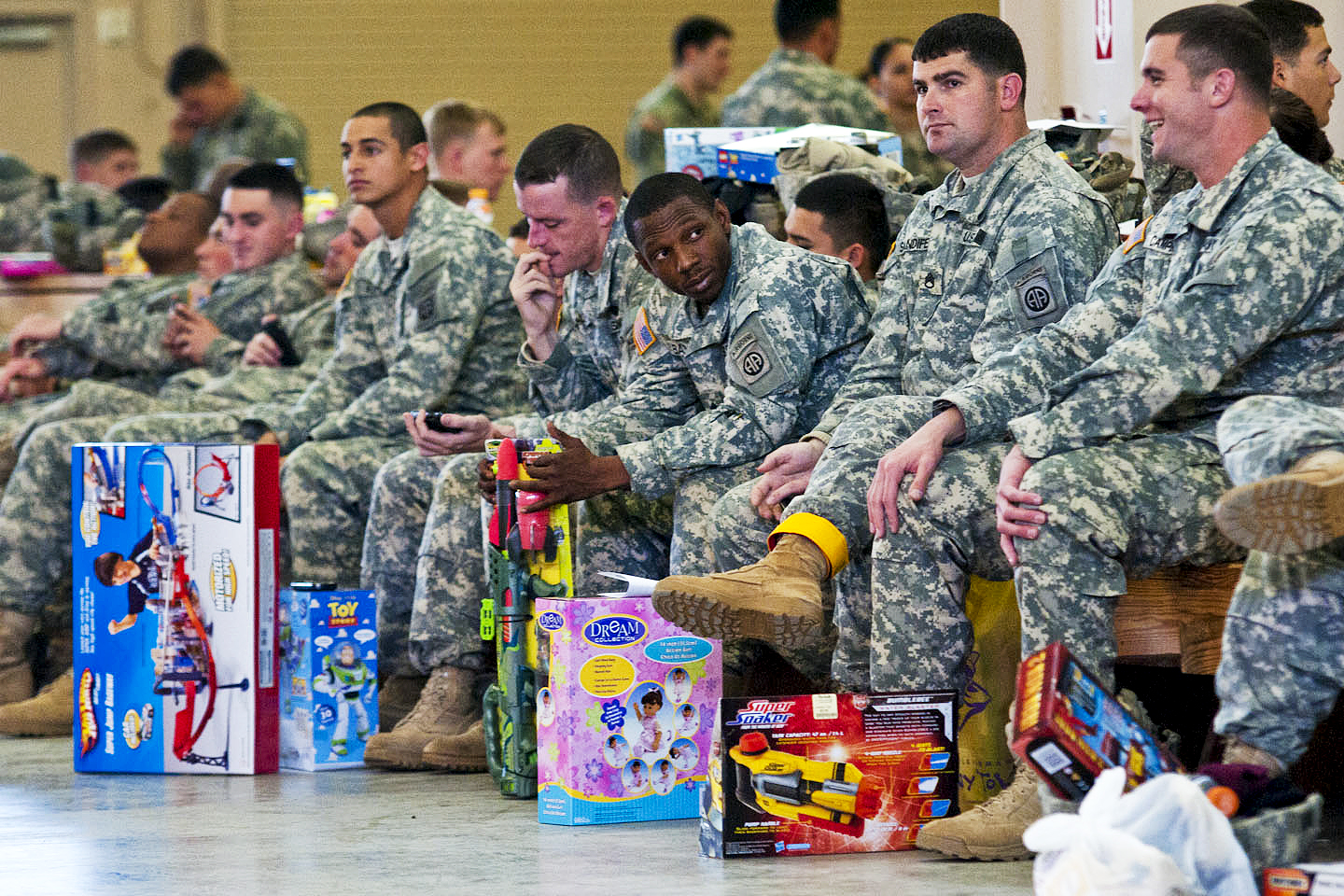
American soldiers with toys to donate

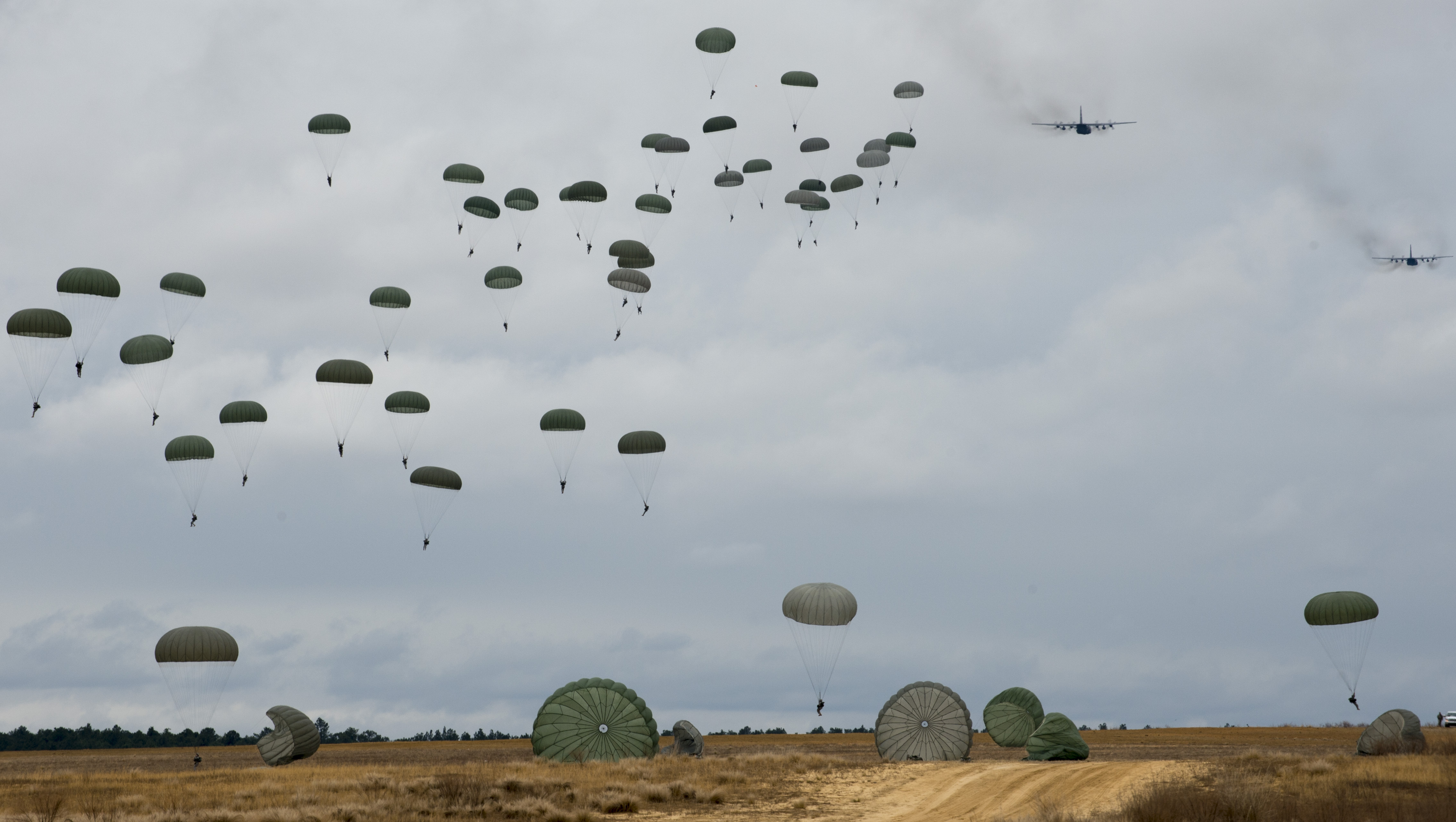
American paratroopers jump from Lockheed C-130 Hercules aircraft

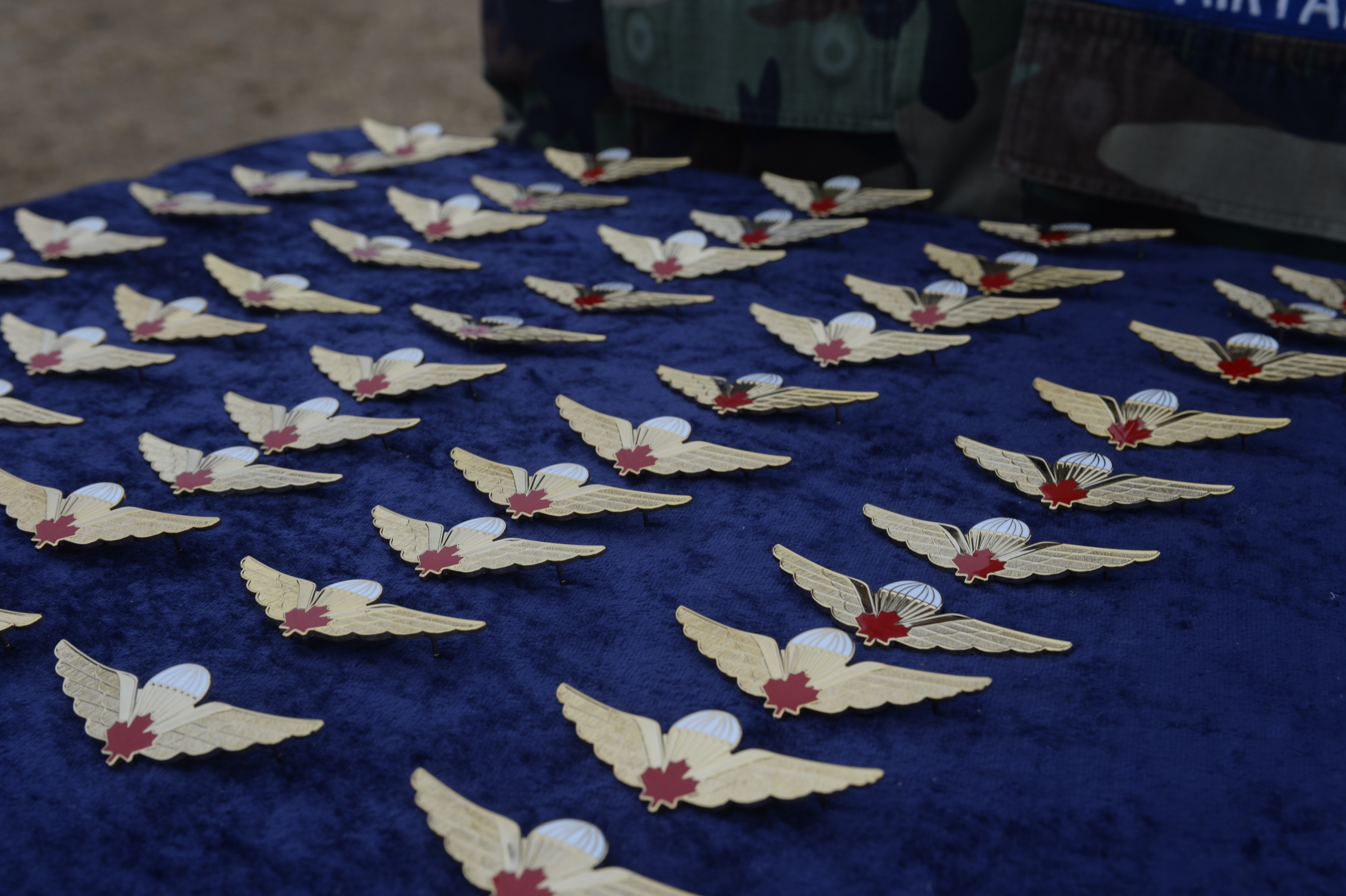
Canadian parachutist badges to be awarded to American paratroopers for participation in Operation Toy Drop

== See also ==
- Toys for Tots – Program that provides toys for children
