= The Fort Bragg Cartel =

2025 non-fiction book by Seth Harp

The Fort Bragg Cartel: Drug Trafficking and Murder in the Special Forces
- Author: Seth Harp
- Audio read by: Dan John Miller
- Language: English
- Genre: Non-fiction, True crime
- Publisher: Viking
- Publication date: August 12, 2025
- Pages: 368
- ISBN: 9780593655085

The Fort Bragg Cartel: Drug Trafficking and Murder in the Special Forces is a non-fiction book by investigative journalist Seth Harp, first published by Viking in August 2025. The book investigates murder and drug trafficking committed on and around Fort Bragg, a U.S. Army installation in Fayetteville, North Carolina that is home to a large number of special operations forces, including the elite Delta Force.

== Background ==
Before becoming a contributing editor at Rolling Stone magazine, Harp was a lawyer and worked as an Assistant Attorney General for the state of Texas. During college and law school, he served in the United States Army Reserve and did one tour of duty in Iraq.

The Fort Bragg Cartel builds on Harp's previous reporting in Rolling Stone. Harp has also written for Harper's Magazine, The New Yorker, The New York Times, Politico, Wired (magazine), The Intercept, Columbia Journalism Review, The Daily Beast, and The Texas Observer.

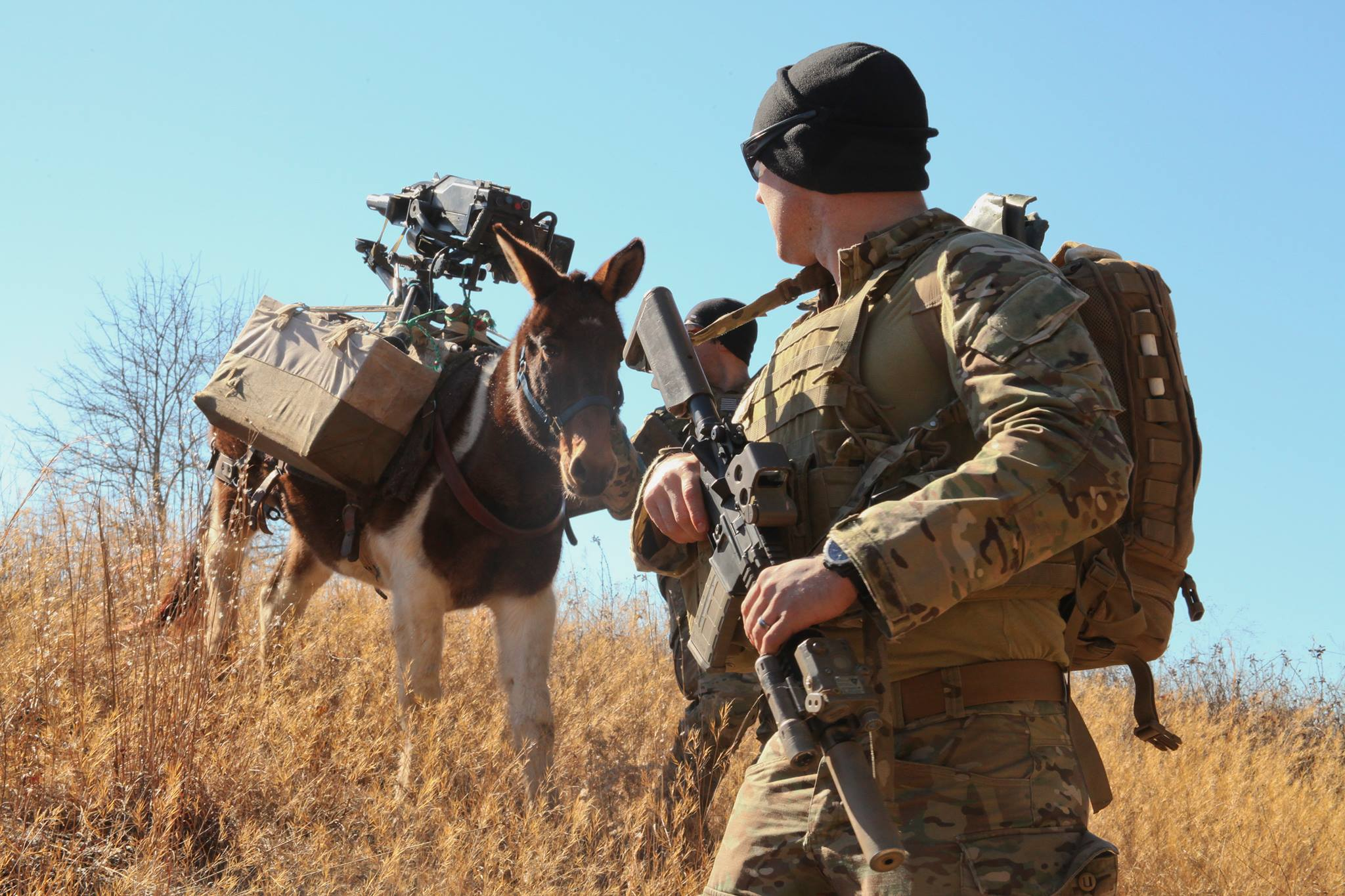
A US Army Green Beret, assigned to 3rd Special Forces Group (Airborne), provides security for a mule carrying the Mk 47 grenade launcher during MULE at Fort Bragg (2015)

== Reception ==
The book debuted on the New York Times Best Seller list at number two for print and ebook and number five for hardcover. The New Yorker declared it one of the best nonfiction books of 2025, while Forbes named it one of the top true crime books of the year. The Washington Post described it as "a propulsive and deeply troubling account of military involvement in the drug trade, both domestically and abroad."

Thomas E. Ricks wrote in a review for The New York Times that Harp, though "tendentious, ... is correct in his central claim" surrounding special forces. David Wallace-Wells, also writing for The New York Times, said the book "upends a set of broadly held assumptions about the recent history of the U.S. military."

Publishers Weekly described the book as "[a] blistering exposé of criminality within the U.S. Army's Special Forces," adding that "Harp's investigative rigor and visceral storytelling make this a disturbing must-read." In The Atlanta Journal-Constitution, Jeff Calder described it as an "explosive investigation into drug dealing, murder, and suicide within America's special operations forces groups, notably superelite Delta Force," and wrote that it was "a book to be taken seriously by the country's political class and military establishment."

"The most affecting parts of The Fort Bragg Cartel are the vignettes Harp collects showing the devastation soldiers inflict on their families," wrote Grayson Scott in The Baffler, referring to the episodes recounted of special operations soldiers stationed at Fort Bragg who killed their wives after deploying multiple times to Afghanistan and struggling with substance abuse. "The characters in his book are middle-class American men, often fathers and usually white, massacring families while high on drugs they bought with money they stole while defending a regime of pedophile warlords."

Dr. Anna Gielas, a historian at the Royal United Services Institute who specializes in research on special operations forces, criticized the book in a review for The Cipher, noting that "readers drawn to true crime will welcome The Fort Bragg Cartel as an entertaining diversion. But those looking for a credible, balanced account of drug use and trafficking inside Delta Force and the U.S. Special Forces will come up short—Harp's book is unconvincing at best, and troubling at worst."

A review for the Washington Independent Review of Books states that "while Harp can't prove that members of U.S. Special Forces took advantage of their privileged status to import drugs and build a domestic cartel using the same thuggery employed during a typical day's work in the endless War on Terror, well, think Occam's razor."

== Controversy ==
In April 2026, it was reported that Courtney Williams, one of Harp's primary sources, was brought up on charges for breaching a part of the Espionage Act after she leaked several files to Mr. Harp for his book and a 2025 Politico article ‘My Life Became a Living Hell’: One Woman’s Career in Delta Force, the Army’s Most Elite Unit.

== Adaptation ==
HBO secured the rights to develop The Fort Bragg Cartel into a television series shortly after its release. Harp will serve as an executive producer alongside Len Amato, former head of HBO Films.

== See also ==
- Global War on Terrorism
- War in Afghanistan (2001–2021)
- Iraq War
- Joint Special Operations Command
- Dirty Wars
- Opioid epidemic in the United States
- CIA drug trafficking allegations
- CIA involvement in Contra cocaine trafficking
