= McArthur Lake (Fort Bragg) =

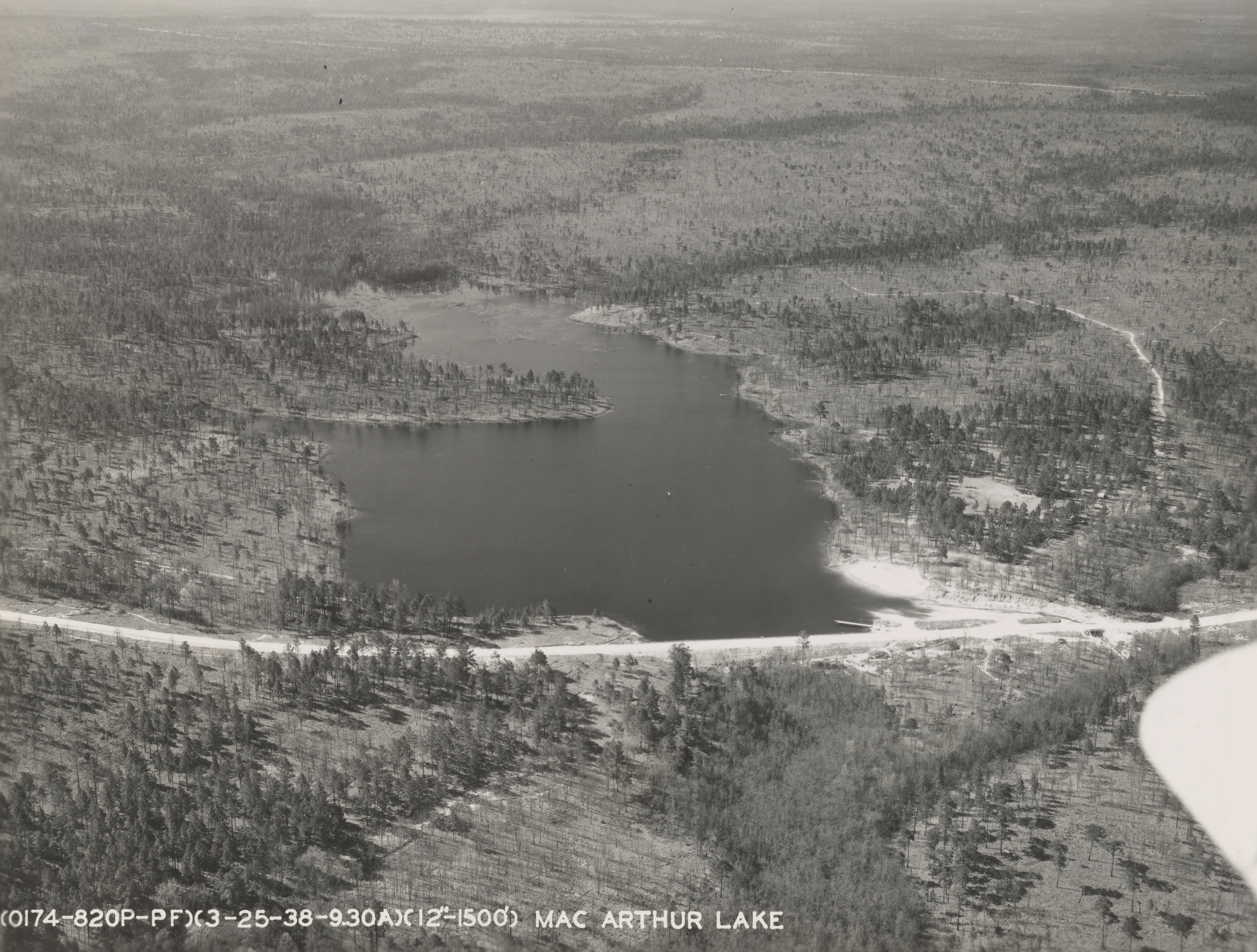
- McArthur Lake in 1938

- Location within North Carolina
- Location: Hoke County, North Carolina, U.S.
- Coordinates: 35°11′00″N 79°15′27″W
- Type: Reservoir
- Basin countries: United States
- Max. length: 1,137 ft (347 m)
- Surface area: 29 acres (12 ha)
- Average depth: 10 ft (3.0 m)
- Water volume: 252 acre-feet (311,000 m^{3})
- Surface elevation: 269 ft (82 m)

McArthur Lake is a lake in Fort Bragg, North Carolina. It is a reservoir formed by an earth dam. The lake is used for recreational fishing.

== Physical ==
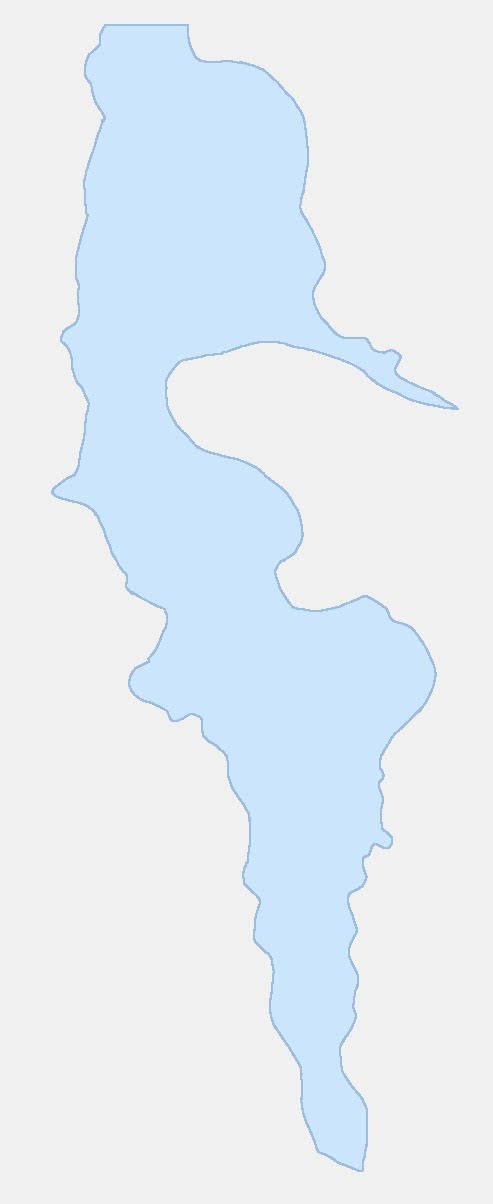
Outline of McArthur Lake

McArthur Lake is at 35.1833°N 79.2576°W in Hoke County, North Carolina. It is owned by Fort Bragg. It was formed in 1935 by construction of Mcarthur Lake Dam. This is an earth dam with a length of 1,137 feet (347 m). The reservoir capacity is 288 acre-feet (355,000 m^{3}). Normal storage is 252 acre-feet (311,000 m^{3}). It covers 29 acres (12 ha) and has an average depth of about 10 feet (3.0 m).

== Hydrology ==
Fort Bragg is on the divide between Little River, which forms the northern boundary of the reservation, and Rockfish Creek 8 to 10 miles (13 to 16 km) south of the reservation. McArthur Lake is in the northern watershed in the west of the reservation. As of 2007 Fort Bragg still owned and operated its water distribution system, although there were plans for it to be privatized. The water was drawn from Little River. McKellars Lake and McArthur Lake provided storage for water that could be released into the Little River if needed. This had never actually been required.

== Recreation ==
The lake is used for recreation. As with all Fort Bragg lakes apart from Smith Lake, it is off limits to swimming, wind surfing, water skiing and use of personal watercraft such as jet skis. There is a ramp for launching boats. There is no boating motor size restriction. The lake is classed as "managed" but not "intensively managed". The water is not treated by practices such as liming and fertilizing. The fish population is respectable and is usually sustained naturally without any supplementary stocking. Fish include largemouth bass, bluegill, redear sunfish, warmouth, flier, pickerel and bullhead catfish.

== Sources ==
- Lake Information Sheet, Fort Bragg Wildlife Branch
- Lane, Renee (26 November 2013), "There's always something to do on Fort Bragg", Fayetteville Observer
- McArthur Lake, Fayetteville Area Convention & Visitors Bureau
- "Mcarthur Lake, northcentral North Carolina", Find lakes
- U.S. Army Corps of Engineers (1978), Restationing of Troops Redeployed from Korea: Environmental Impact Statement
- U.S. Army Environmental Command (2007), Army Growth and Force Structure Realignment: Environmental Impact Statement
