= Simmons Army Airfield =

Airport in Fort Bragg, North Carolina

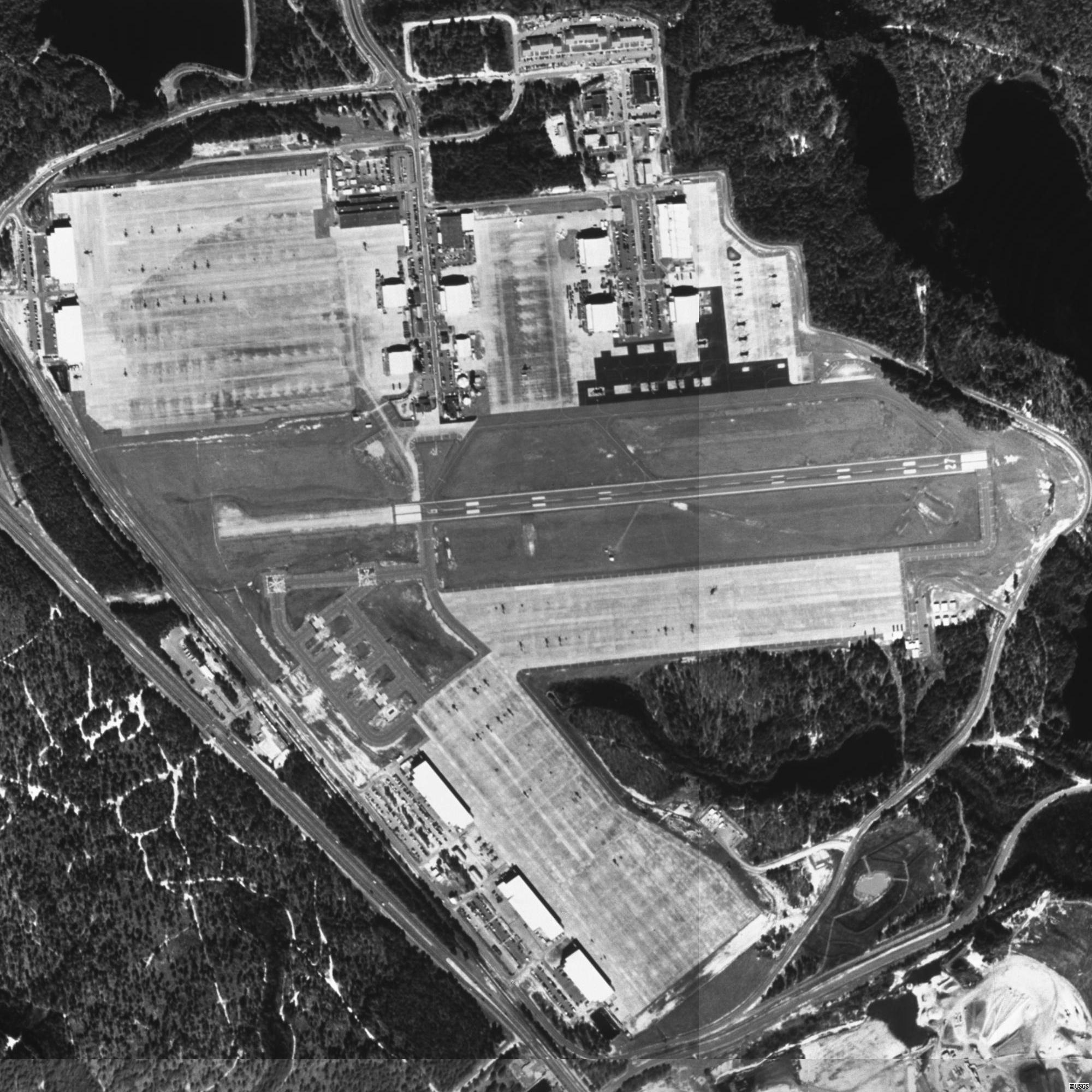
- USGS aerial image - 4 March 1999
- IATA: FBG; ICAO: KFBG; FAA LID: FBG

Summary
- Airport type: Military
- Owner: U.S. Army ATCA-ASO
- Location: Fort Bragg, North Carolina
- Elevation AMSL: 244 ft / 74 m
- Coordinates: 35°07′55″N 078°56′11″W
- Website: www.bragg.army.mil/SAAF/
- Interactive map of Simmons Army Airfield

Runways
Direction	Length		Surface
Direction	ft	m	Surface
9/27	4,650	1,417	Asphalt
- Source: Federal Aviation Administration

Simmons Army Airfield (IATA: FBG, ICAO: KFBG, FAA LID: FBG) is a military use airport located in Cumberland County, North Carolina, United States. It is located on the southeast portion of Fort Bragg and supports the aviation needs of the XVIII Airborne Corps, the 82nd Airborne Division, Special Operations, U.S. Army Reserve and U.S. National Guard aviation units.

== Units ==
82nd Airborne Division

- Combat Aviation Brigade
  - 1st Squadron, 17th Cavalry Regiment formerly flew the Bell OH-58D Kiowa Warrior and swapped airframes to the AH-64E in 2017.
  - 1st Battalion (Attack), 82nd Aviation Regiment AH-64E
  - 2nd Battalion (Assault), 82nd Aviation Regiment UH-60M
  - 3rd Battalion (General Support), 82nd Aviation Regiment UH-60M(Medevac), CH-47F
  - 122nd Aviation Support Battalion

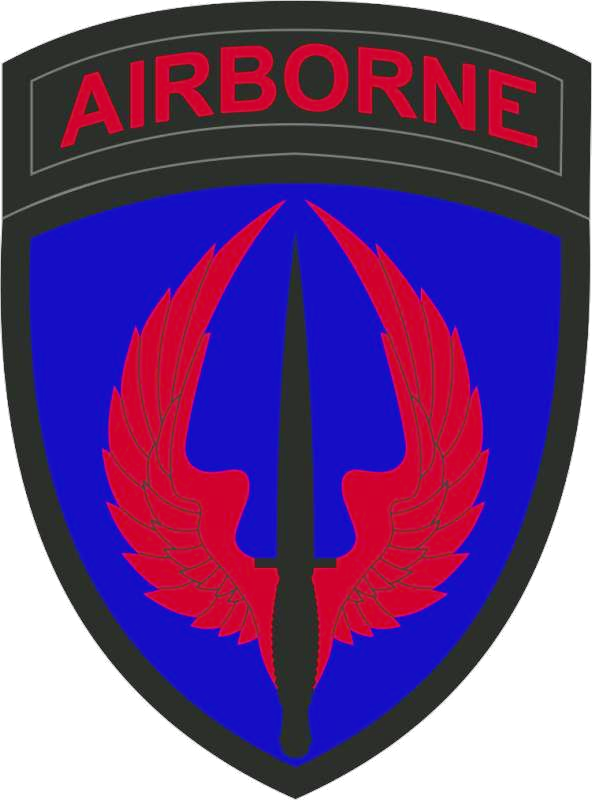
U.S. Army Special Operations Aviation Command

- United States Army Special Operations Command Flight Detachment

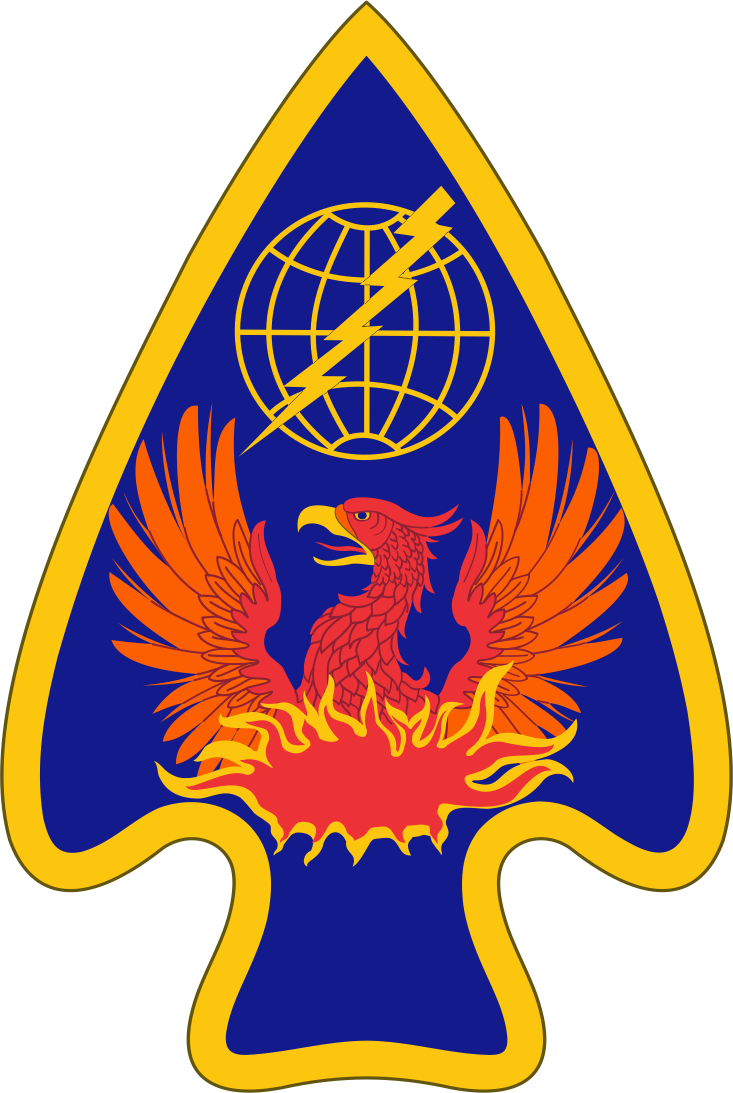
164th Theater Airfield Operations Group

- 3rd Airfield Operations Battalion, 58th Aviation Regiment

== History ==
As part of Exercise Test Drop in August 1952, the 406th Engineer Brigade constructed an airfield in the vicinity of Smith Lake on land acquired by Fort Bragg. The field originally known as Smith Lake Airfield.

In June 1952 the 6th Transportation Company (Helicopter) arrived with 21 Sikorsky H-19C Chickasaw and two Bell H-13 Sioux helicopters; it deployed to Korea in December 1952 as the first combat helicopter company.

In May 1953 Fort Bragg engineers completed final plans for an expanded field and started construction the next summer. In August 1954, the runway was repaved, aprons improved, and the floor was laid for field's first hangar.

On June 21, 1955, the airfield was renamed in honor of Warrant Officer Herbert W. Simmons, Jr., a pilot killed on November 3, 1953, when two H-29B helicopters collided near the field.

During the mid-1950s, the Helio U-10 Courier aircraft was tested at Simmons. Most of the Army's U-10s were stationed at Fort Bragg and in the Panama Canal Zone. The first U-10 from Fort Bragg is now in the Army Aviation Museum at Fort Rucker in Alabama.

Construction in 1956-1957 converted the field to a permanent army airfield, allowing transfer of air activities from overcrowded Pope Air Force Base to Simmons AAF. In 1957 the 82nd Aviation Company was formed at Simmons.

In the early 1960s Fort Bragg and Simmons played an important role in emerging air mobility. In December 1961 the 8th Transportation Company (Light Helicopter), departed Simmons AAF with their Piasecki H-21 helicopters for duty in Vietnam. The 8th and another unit, the 57th Transportation Company, were the first helicopter units to serve in Southeast Asia.

By 1965 Simmons comprised 23 permanent buildings, which remain in use. Fixed wing aircraft based at Simmons included the XVIII Airborne Corps and 82nd Airborne Division liaison planes, Grumman OV-1 Mohawk observation aircraft and the 4th ASTA (Aerial Surveillance Target Acquisition) attached to the 82nd Aviation Battalion.

During July 1965 the 116th Assault Helicopter Company formed at Simmons and trained for duty in Vietnam. The company departed for Vietnam in October 1965 and joined the 11th Combat Aviation Battalion there.

The 18th Aviation Brigade activated at Fort Bragg on July 1, 1966, formed from the 269th Aviation Battalion. Following seven months of training, the 269th departed for Vietnam in January 1967 where it served in the 12th Aviation Group.

By 1976 Simmons had 176 aircraft assigned and 375 flights operations a day. In 1983 the number grew to 298 aircraft. The 82nd Combat Aviation Battalion expanded in July 1979, acquiring the 119th and 129th Assault Helicopter Companies of the 269th Aviation Battalion. These two companies became A and B companies of the newly designated 82nd Combat Aviation Battalion. The battalion deployed to Grenada for Operation Urgent Fury in October 1983 and remained into 1984.

In the early 1980s there were 22 operating activities with total personnel strength of 2,134 and 298 assigned aircraft.

On August 17, 1987 the Headquarters and Headquarters Company, 269th Aviation Battalion, reorganized and was redesignated as the 18th Aviation Brigade. The brigade served in the Persian Gulf, Panama, first Gulf War, and provided storm relief following Florida's Hurricane Andrew. On the first day of the Gulf War, February 24, 1991, the 18th Aviation Brigade airlifted troops and equipment into Iraq.

By 2002 Simmons AAF had more than 180 aircraft, along with Sikorsky UH-60 Black Hawk and Boeing AH-64 Apache flight simulators.

== Facilities ==
Simmons AAF has one runway designated 9/27 with an asphalt surface measuring 4,650 by 110 feet (1,417 x 34 m).

== See also ==
- List of airports in North Carolina
- List of United States Army airfields
