= Ann Wright =

American political writer and anti-Iraq War activist

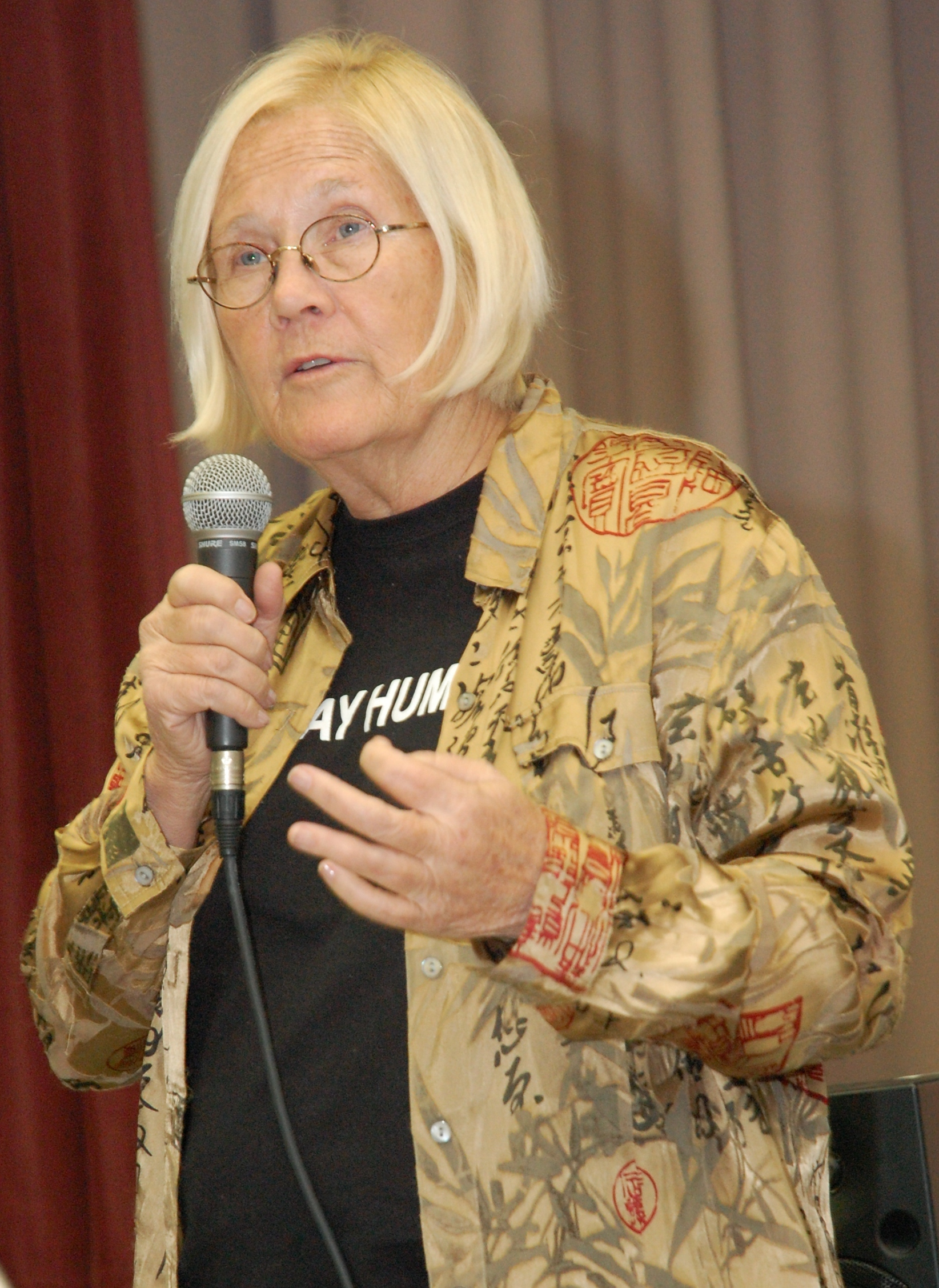
- Wright in November 2011
- Born: Mary Ann Wright; 1947 (age 78–79)
- Military career
- Allegiance: United States
- Branch: United States Army
- Rank: Colonel
- Conflicts: Sierra Leone Civil War

Mary Ann Wright (born 1947) is a retired United States Army colonel and retired U.S. State Department official, known for her outspoken opposition to the Iraq War. She received the State Department Award for Heroism in 1997, after helping to evacuate several thousand people during the civil war in Sierra Leone.

Wright was one of three State Department officials to publicly resign in direct protest of the 2003 Invasion of Iraq. Wright was also a passenger on the Challenger 1, which along with the Mavi Marmara, was part of the Gaza Freedom Flotilla. As of 2024, she is a member of Veteran Intelligence Professionals for Sanity.

== Early life and education ==
Wright grew up in Bentonville, Arkansas, in what she referred to as "just a normal childhood". She attended the University of Arkansas, where she was recruited in the U.S. Army. Wright earned a master's degree from the Naval War College and a J.D. degree from the University of Arkansas while working for the U.S. Army.

== Career ==
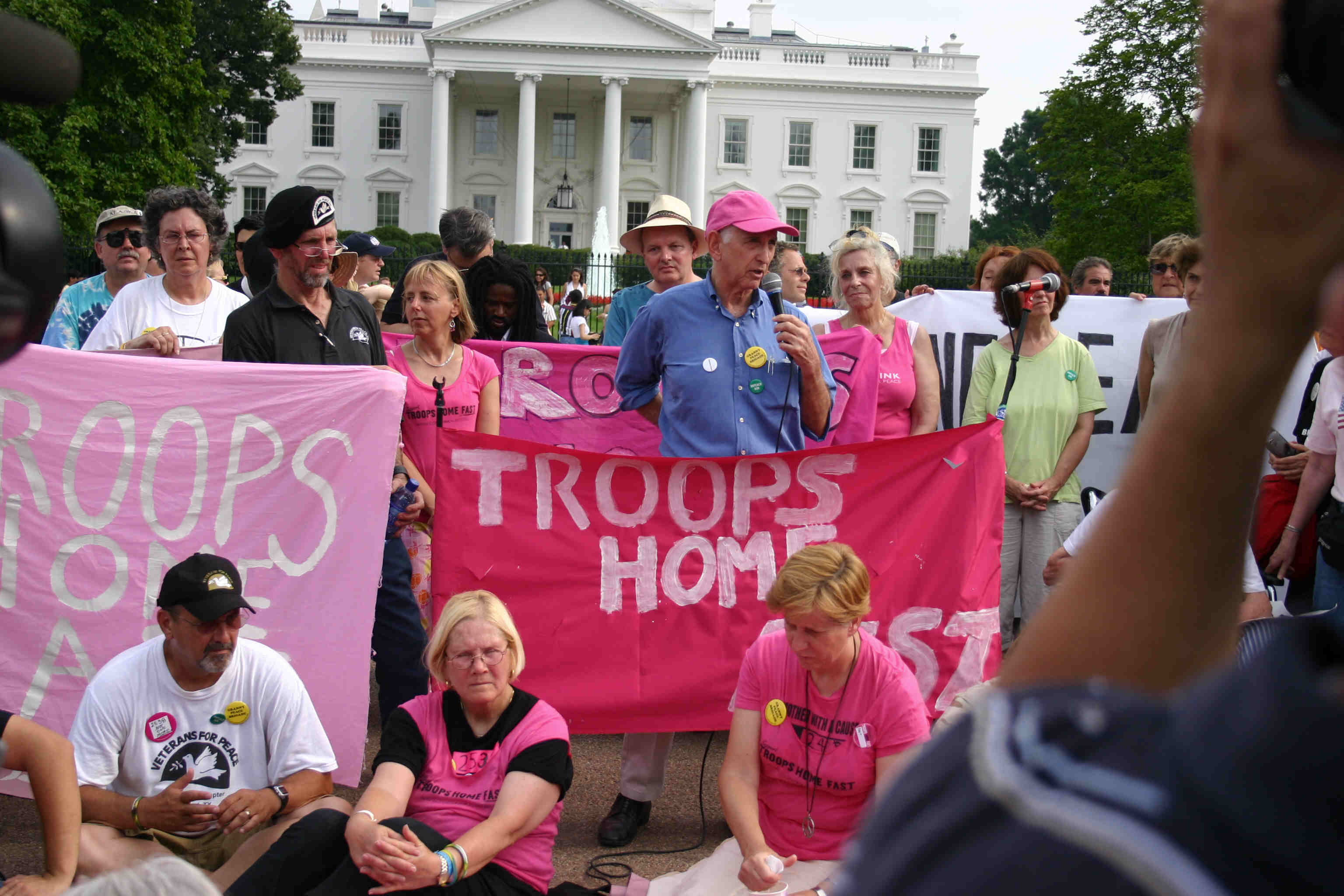
Wright protesting outside of the White House with Code Pink in July 2006

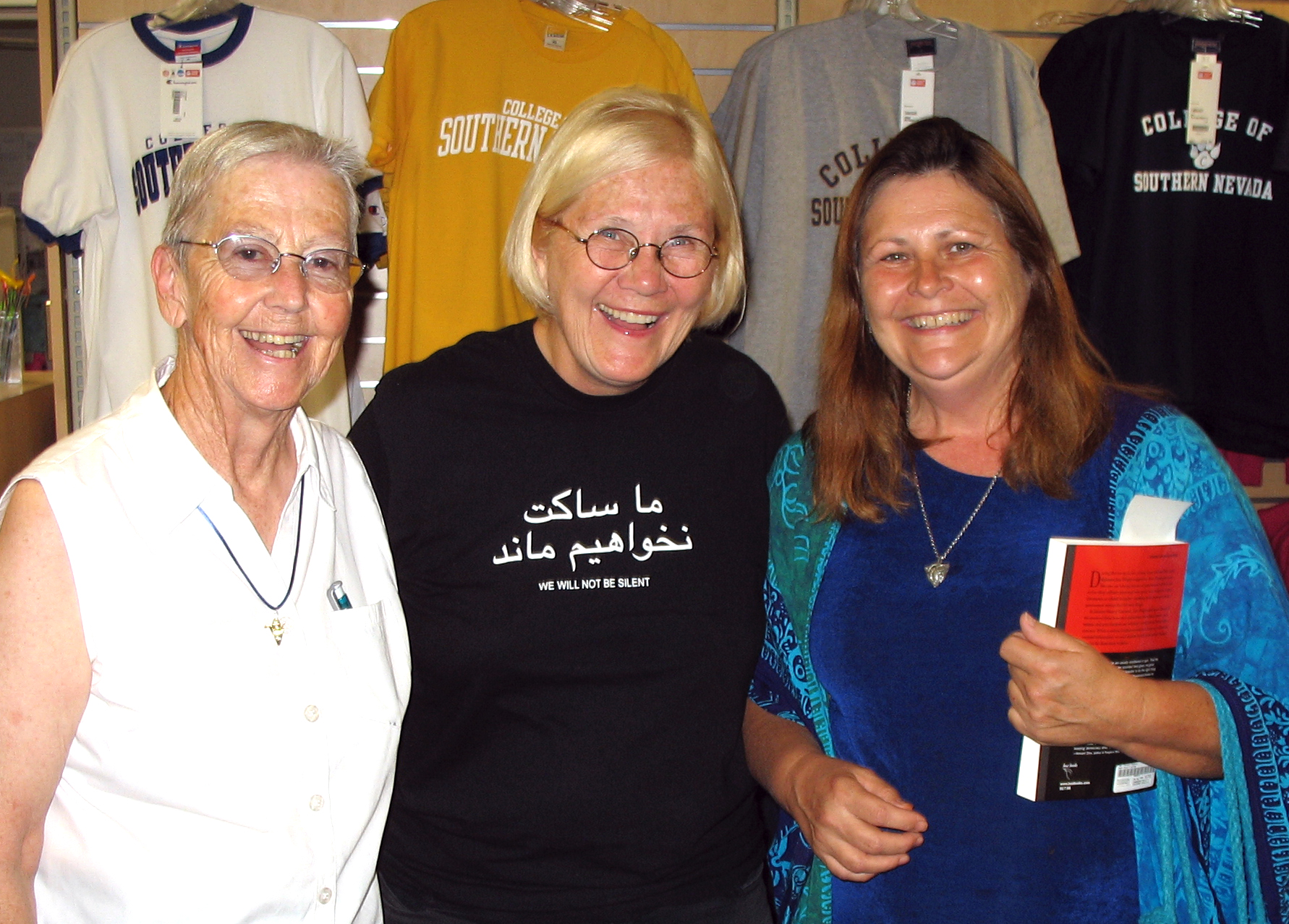
Ann Wright (center) with Megan Rice (left) in August 2008

Wright participated in reconstruction efforts after U.S. military actions in Grenada and Somalia.

Wright went on to serve 13 years in active duty in the U.S. Army, and 16 years in the Army Reserves, rising to the rank of colonel. She was placed in the Retired Ready Reserve, meaning the President could call her back to active duty in a time of need.

=== U.S. State Department ===
In 1987, Wright went to work for the Foreign Service within the U.S. State Department. Over the course of her State Department career, Wright served as Deputy Chief of Mission at the U.S. embassies in Afghanistan (which she helped open following the 2001 U.S. invasion of Afghanistan, an assignment she volunteered for), Sierra Leone (an embassy which she helped close and then reopen again), Micronesia and Mongolia, and also served at U.S. embassies in Uzbekistan, which she helped open, Kyrgyzstan, Grenada, and Nicaragua.

Wright's eventual resignation was not the first time she had spoken out against policy. In an interview, Wright said that she spoke out against United Nations bombing tactics waged in Somalia in the effort to kill rebel leader Mohamed Farrah Aidid. Wright also said that she repeatedly disagreed with policy on multiple occasions but continued her work at the State Department.

==== Resignation ====
Wright submitted her resignation letter to then U.S. Secretary of State Colin Powell on March 19, 2003, the day before the onset of the 2003 Invasion of Iraq. Her letter was published on the internet the following day.

In her resignation letter, Wright listed four reasons she could no longer work for the U.S. government under the Bush administration:

- The decision to invade Iraq without the blessing of the U.N. Security Council
- The "lack of effort" in the Israeli-Palestinian peace process
- The "lack of policy" in regard to North Korea
- The curtailment of civil liberties within the United States.

Wright was the third of three State Department officials to retire from service in protest in the month prior to the invasion of Iraq, the other two being Brady Kiesling and John H. Brown. Wright says that she did not know the other two, and had not read their resignation letters at the time she submitted her own.

=== Peace activism ===
After her retirement from the State Department, Wright became an outspoken figure in the movement opposed to the occupation of Iraq and other anti-war movements.

Wright worked with anti-war activist Cindy Sheehan, most notably by helping organize the Camp Casey demonstration outside George W. Bush's Crawford, Texas, ranch in August 2005, and by accompanying the southern leg of the Bring Them Home Now bus tour. She also volunteered at Camp Casey 3, started by Desert storm Veteran Dennis Kyne and Veterans for Peace days after Hurricane Katrina. She marched with Sheehan in 2006 with the Women Say No to War campaign, which was meant to deliver a petition with over 60,000 signatures of citizens against the war.

Wright has willingly been arrested while taking part in anti-war demonstrations, the first such arrest occurring in front of the White House on September 26, 2005. She has said in interviews that she does not remove the arrest bracelets attached to her wrists upon the processing of her arrest, but rather collects them.

On October 19, 2005, Wright interrupted a Senate Foreign Relations Committee hearing, shouting at Secretary of State Condoleezza Rice, "Stop the war! Stop the killing!", after which she was escorted out of the hearing room.

In January 2006, Wright served as one of five judges at the second session of the International Commission of Inquiry On Crimes Against Humanity Committed by the Bush Administration, a project organized by the organization Not in Our Name.

Wright was one of three witnesses called to testify at an Article 32 hearing on behalf of U.S. Army Lt. Ehren Watada, who on June 22, 2006 refused to deploy to Iraq with his unit, asserting that the war violates both the United States Constitution and international law. Both Wright and Watada were two of the three recipients of the first annual Truthout Freedom and Democracy Awards in February 2007.

On March 30, 2007 Wright appeared on the TV show The O'Reilly Factor to discuss the Geneva Conventions and how they applied to Iran in its taking of 15 British hostages. The discussion grew heated, and during the course of the exchange, O'Reilly questioned Wright's patriotism. When she pointed out she had served 29 years in the military and O'Reilly had never served at all her microphone was cut off.

On April 1, 2007 Wright was cited, along with 38 other anti-nuclear activists, for trespassing at the Nevada Test Site during a Nevada Desert Experience event protesting against the continued development of nuclear weapons by the United States.

On April 17, 2007, Wright attended a hearing of a House Foreign Affairs subcommittee. She was ejected from the hearing room after speaking out of turn in response to comments made by Republican Congressman Dana Rohrabacher. On September 11, 2007, Wright was arrested, and later convicted, for disrupting a Senate Armed Services Committee hearing at which U.S. general David Petraeus and ambassador to Iraq Ryan Crocker were testifying.

Wright took part in a September 15, 2007 protest march and die-in on the steps of the United States Capitol Building, organized by the ANSWER Coalition and Iraq Veterans Against the War (IVAW). She was arrested for stepping over the wall after several IVAW and Veterans for Peace members were arrested.

On October 3, 2007, Wright and Code Pink activist Medea Benjamin were denied entry to Canada because their names appear on an FBI database, called the National Crime Information Center, due to arrests related to their anti-war activism. Wright and Benjamin were told that if they wish to enter Canada in the future, they will have to apply for resident's permits. In regards to the incident, a Canadian MP, Olivia Chow, was "alarmed to learn that Canadian border police are enforcinig rules that have been determined by the FBI and other U.S.-based agencies."

In December 2008, Wright expressed her dissatisfaction with U.S foreign policy toward Palestine.

In 2009 Wright began work as a leading member of the steering committee for the Gaza Freedom March.

In August 2014 she was among the signatories of an open letter to German Chancellor Angela Merkel by the group Veteran Intelligence Professionals for Sanity in which they urged the Chancellor to be suspicious of U.S. intelligence regarding the alleged invasion of Russia in Eastern Ukraine.

In 2017, Wright was awarded The US Peace Prize by the US Peace Memorial Foundation “for courageous antiwar activism, inspirational peace leadership, and selfless citizen diplomacy.”

On October 31, 2023, Code Pink opposed US support for Israel following the Hamas attacks of October 7. The group repeatedly disrupted Secretary of State Antony Blinken's testimony to a Senate hearing on Israel aid from the United States, with protesters calling for a ceasefire. Several peace activists were arrested, including Wright and activist David Barrows.

== Gaza flotilla ==
Wright was on board the Challenger 1, a vessel that was part of the first Gaza Freedom Flotilla, organized by the Free Gaza Movement, which was raided by Israel on 30 May 2010. On June 3, 2010 Wright was interviewed by Democracy Now! and described observing the Israeli soldiers rappeling down from helicopters onto the deck of the Turkish ship Mavi Marmara. Her own ship was boarded. "Flash bangs were used. One of our journalists was hit with something of an electric shock. I don’t know that it was a taser."

Subsequently, on 10 June 2010, Wright was one of five activists who offered themselves up for arrest in California Rep. Brad Sherman's office after he made a public statement that any American who provides humanitarian aid to Gaza should be prosecuted under the Antiterrorism and Effective Death Penalty Act of 1996. No arrests were made.

== September 11th attacks and the 9/11 Commission report ==
In a 2007 interview on the Air America Radio network, Wright described the 9/11 Commission Report on the September 11 attacks as "totally inadequate", adding that she does not understand why the US national intelligence and defense operations completely failed and how the Pentagon could be hit on 9/11.

Earlier, in 2004, she signed a letter to Congress, criticizing the 9/11 Commission for serious shortcomings and omissions, which according to the signatories renders the report flawed and casts doubt on the validity of its recommendations.

== Writings ==
In 2008, Koa Books published Dissent: Voices of Conscience, co-authored by Ann Wright and Susan Dixon. Subtitled Government Insiders Speak Out Against the War in Iraq, the work includes a foreword by longtime anti-war activist Daniel Ellsberg, who leaked the top-secret Pentagon Papers in 1971.

== Quotes ==
- “Refusing to participate in military operations that violate international law -- the war of aggression, the use of torture, the use of illegal weapons and purposeful targeting of innocent civilians will save Lt. Watada his sanity and his soul.”

== See also ==
- Ehren Watada – former US Army Officer who opposed the Iraq War
- List of peace activists
