= David Cline (activist) =

American anti-war and veterans rights advocate

David Cline (January 8, 1947 – September 14, 2007) was an American anti-war and veterans rights activist. He was best known as National President of Veterans For Peace (VFP) from 2000 to 2006, Chapter Vice President of Alan Reilly – Gene Glazer VFP Chapter 21, and co-founder of the Vietnam Agent Orange Relief and Responsibility Campaign. Cline was featured in the 2006 film Sir! No Sir!, which documented the GI antiwar movement during the Vietnam war as well as in the book "Winter Soldiers: An Oral History of Vietnam Veterans Against the War" by Richard Stacewicz.

Cline was known not only for his anti-war stance upon returning from service in Vietnam, but also for being a leader in the anti-Iraq War movement. As President of VFP, Cline built a relationship between VFP and the fledgling organization of military families opposed to the war in Iraq, Military Families Speak Out! (MFSO) in 2002 and provided guidance to returning Iraq vets who founded Iraq Veterans Against the War (IVAW) in 2004. He is credited with helping to establish the Bring Them Home Now Campaign and served on the organization's coordinating committee until his death. In 2002, he led a group of activists to Puerto Rico to protest the U.S. Navy's use of depleted uranium and Vieques as a bombing range.

Following VFPs arrival in New Orleans after Hurricane Katrina behind the leadership of Desert Storm Veteran Dennis Kyne, Dave was instrumental in planning the Walkin' To New Orleans march from Mobile, Alabama, to New Orleans, Louisiana, to draw attention to the work Kyne and many others had done.

== Personal information and Army Tour ==
Cline was born on January 8, 1947, in Buffalo, New York. He was drafted into the U.S. Army when he was 20 years old, arriving in Vietnam in August 1967 and serving in the 25th Infantry Division as a rifleman and machine gunner. During his tour, he was wounded three times, the third time seriously enough to be sent back to the army hospital at Fort Dix, New Jersey in 1968. He received three Purple Hearts and a Bronze Star during his time in the Army. He later recalled being told he was going to Vietnam "to help the people of South Vietnam", but quickly realized it wasn't true because the Army hated the Vietnamese — "As soon as you get there they first thing they tell you is you can't trust any of them, they're gooks, they're not human beings." While recuperating from his injuries in a hospital he found a book "called The New Legions by Donald Duncan", an ex-Green Beret who after his tour in Vietnam wrote about why he quit the Army. Cline felt that Duncan was saying "basically...we're fighting on the wrong side." Cline said, "When I read that book it made a lot of sense to me because that's what I saw. So I made a decision I was going to come back to the United States and start working against the war."

== Antiwar and Union Activity ==
Returning to Fort Hood, Texas, Cline became an anti-war activist, serving as a civilian organizer of active duty servicemen at one of the first GI Coffeehouses, the Oleo Strut, in Killeen, Texas and producing a one-sheet underground newspaper on politics and veterans issues called Fatigue Press, which was distributed clandestinely on the military base. He explained, "I was sent down to Fort Hood and that's when I really got hooked up with the GI movement." He soon realized the base was training soldiers just back from Vietnam in riot control to go to the Democratic National Convention in Chicago in 1968. There were a lot of soldiers not happy about this, "we fought the Vietnamese, now they want you to fight Americans. A lot of people identified with the demonstrators on different levels." "We decided to organize a movement against it because there was a lot of opposition to the ideal of going to Chicago." He joined Vietnam Veterans Against the War in 1970, where he served as a coordinator and national director, and remained a member until his death. He died on September 14, 2007, at his home in Jersey City, New Jersey, at the age of 60.

While working for the U.S. Postal Service in Jersey City, Cline was a post office union representative and served as vice president of Transportation Workers Union Local 600.

== See also ==
- Bring Them Home Now Tour
- Winter Soldier Investigation
