= Gold Star Families for Peace =

American military support organization

Gold Star Families for Peace (GSFP) is a United States–based organization founded in January 2005 by individuals who lost family members in the Iraq War, and are thus entitled to display a Gold Star. It is considered an offshoot of Military Families Speak Out. Gold Star Families for Peace now includes more than 65 families of troops killed in Iraq.

Joining with organizations including Veterans for Peace, United for Peace and Justice, Code Pink, Military Families Speak Out, the Crawford Peace House and others, GSFP is actively protesting US military action in Iraq. They have used speaking engagements, congressional testimony and protests throughout the United States.

GSFP regarded the George W. Bush administration's reasons for those operations as falsehoods and grounds for impeachment of George Bush.

== Protest in Crawford, Texas ==
Gold Star families and Veterans for Peace bring "Impeachment Tour" bus to Crawford, Texas, August, 2005

On August 7, 2005, the group arrived in Crawford, Texas, in a bus provided by Veterans for Peace, painted red, white and blue with the words "Veterans For Peace Impeachment Tour" on it and demanded to talk with President Bush. Prior to arriving at Crawford, the group had been in Dallas attending a Veterans for Peace convention.

In recognition of the action and continual opposition to the US-led war in Iraq, in 2006 Gold Star Families for Peace and Cindy Sheehan were awarded the 'Domestic Human Rights Award' by Global Exchange, an international human rights organization based in San Francisco.

== GSFP founding members ==
- Cindy and Patrick Sheehan – parents of Army Spc. Casey Sheehan, KIA in Sadr City, Baghdad on April 4, 2004
- Jane and Jim Bright – mother and stepfather of Army Sgt. Evan Ashcraft, KIA in Mosul, Iraq on July 24, 2003
- Bill Mitchell – father of Army Sgt. Michael Mitchell, KIA in Sadr City Baghdad on April 4, 2004
- Celeste Zappala – mother of Army Sgt. Sherwood Baker, KIA in Baghdad on April 26, 2004
- Lila Lipscomb – mother of Army Sgt. Michael Pederson, KIA on April 2, 2003, in Karbala, Iraq. (Lipscomb had been a featured subject in the 2004 documentary Fahrenheit 9/11, both before and after her son was killed.)
- Sue Niederer – mother of Lt. Seth J. Dvorin, KIA on 02/03/04
- Dede Miller – aunt of Army Spc. Casey Sheehan (above)

As of 2005 Gold Star Families for Peace included 65 family members of soldiers killed in Iraq.

== GSFP mission statement and purpose ==
- The group's mission statement reads as follows:
- GSFP Purpose statement:
  - To bring an end to the occupation of Iraq.
  - To be a support group for Gold Star Families.

Membership:

- Anyone who has had a relative killed as a result of war.
- Primarily, but not limited to the invasion/occupation of Iraq.

== See also ==
- 2003 invasion of Iraq
- Arlington West: The Film
- Downing Street memo
- Gold Star Mothers Club
- Gold Star Wives
- List of anti-war organizations
- List of peace activists
- Movement to impeach George W. Bush
- United for Peace and Justice
- Yellowcake forgeries
