= Cindy Sheehan =

American antiwar activist (born 1957)

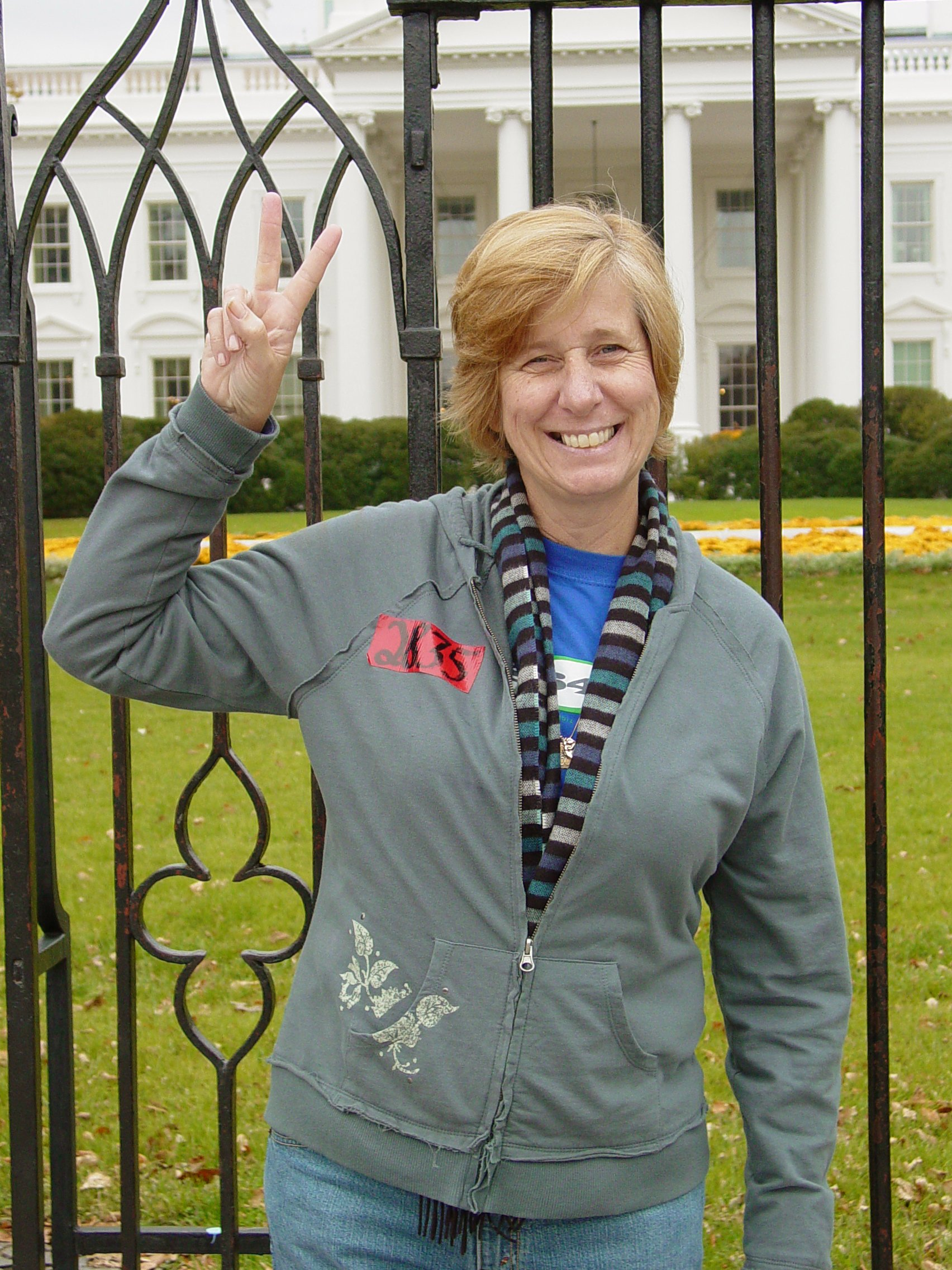
- Sheehan gives the peace sign in front of the White House in 2006
- Born: Cindy Lee Miller; July 10, 1957 (age 69); Inglewood, California, U.S.
- Education: Cerritos College; University of California, Los Angeles
- Occupation: Activist
- Political party: Democratic (before 2007); Independent (2007–2010); Peace and Freedom (2010–present)
- Children: Four

Cindy Lee Sheehan (née Miller; born July 10, 1957) is an American anti-war activist, whose son, U.S. Army Specialist Casey Sheehan, was killed by enemy action during the Iraq War. She attracted national and international media attention in August 2005 for her extended antiwar protest at a makeshift camp outside President George W. Bush's Texas ranch—a stand that drew both passionate support and criticism. Sheehan ran unsuccessfully for Congress in 2008. She was a vocal critic of President Barack Obama's foreign policy. Her memoir, Peace Mom: A Mother's Journey Through Heartache to Activism, was published in 2006. In an interview with The Daily Beast in 2017, Sheehan continued to hold her critical views towards George W. Bush, while also criticizing the militarism of Donald Trump.

Sheehan was the 2012 vice presidential nominee of the Peace and Freedom Party alongside Roseanne Barr, and received 1.2% of the statewide vote in the 2014 California gubernatorial primary election.

== Early life ==
Cindy Sheehan was born Cindy Lee Miller in Inglewood, California, in 1957. Her father worked at the Lockheed Corporation while her mother raised her family. Sheehan graduated with honors from Cerritos College and studied history at UCLA. She worked as a youth minister at St. Mary's Catholic Church in Vacaville, California for eight years, and also coordinated an after-school program for at-risk middle school children for the City of Vacaville.

== Casey Sheehan ==
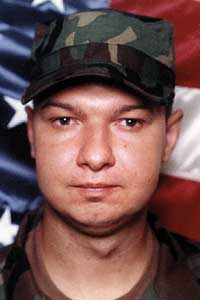
Casey Sheehan

Casey Austin Sheehan (May 29, 1979 – April 4, 2004) was a specialist in the United States Army who was killed during combat action while serving in the Iraq War.

=== Military service ===
In May 2000, Casey Sheehan enlisted in the United States Army as a light-wheeled vehicle mechanic, MOS 63B. It has been reported that he may have considered enlisting as a chaplain assistant MOS 56M. (Sheehan had acted as an altar server during the Palm Sunday mass on the morning of his death).

Near the end of his active service, the 2003 invasion of Iraq began. Sheehan reenlisted, knowing that his unit would be sent there. Sheehan's division, the First Cavalry Division, was sent to Iraq. On March 19, 2004, Sheehan's Battery C, 1st Battalion, 82nd Field Artillery Regiment, arrived at FOB Camp War Eagle in Sadr City. On April 4, 2004, Sheehan was killed in action after volunteering to be part of a Quick Reaction Force to rescue American troops in the "Black Sunday" incident that began the Siege of Sadr City.

=== Burial ===
Casey Sheehan is buried in Vacaville-Elmira Cemetery in Vacaville, California. In May 2006, the tombstone that Casey's family had been designing and commissioned was finally ready and placed at Casey's grave. Cindy Sheehan paid for the tombstone herself, which is normally the case, stating, "It is important for the rest of Casey's family to have one.... I guess the pain of seeing it etched in marble that he is dead is another pain I will have to deal with." Cindy Sheehan maintains that the U.S. government "should have paid for it because of its responsibility for his death." The Sheehan family did not want the furnished monument that the government provides because it did not reflect Casey's entire life or personality.

=== Legacy ===
Casey Sheehan was awarded the Purple Heart and Bronze Star with V for Valor posthumously for his actions April 4, 2004. The chapel at Fort Hood started a new Knights of Columbus chapter that was named the Specialist Casey Austin Sheehan Council.

== Antiwar campaign ==
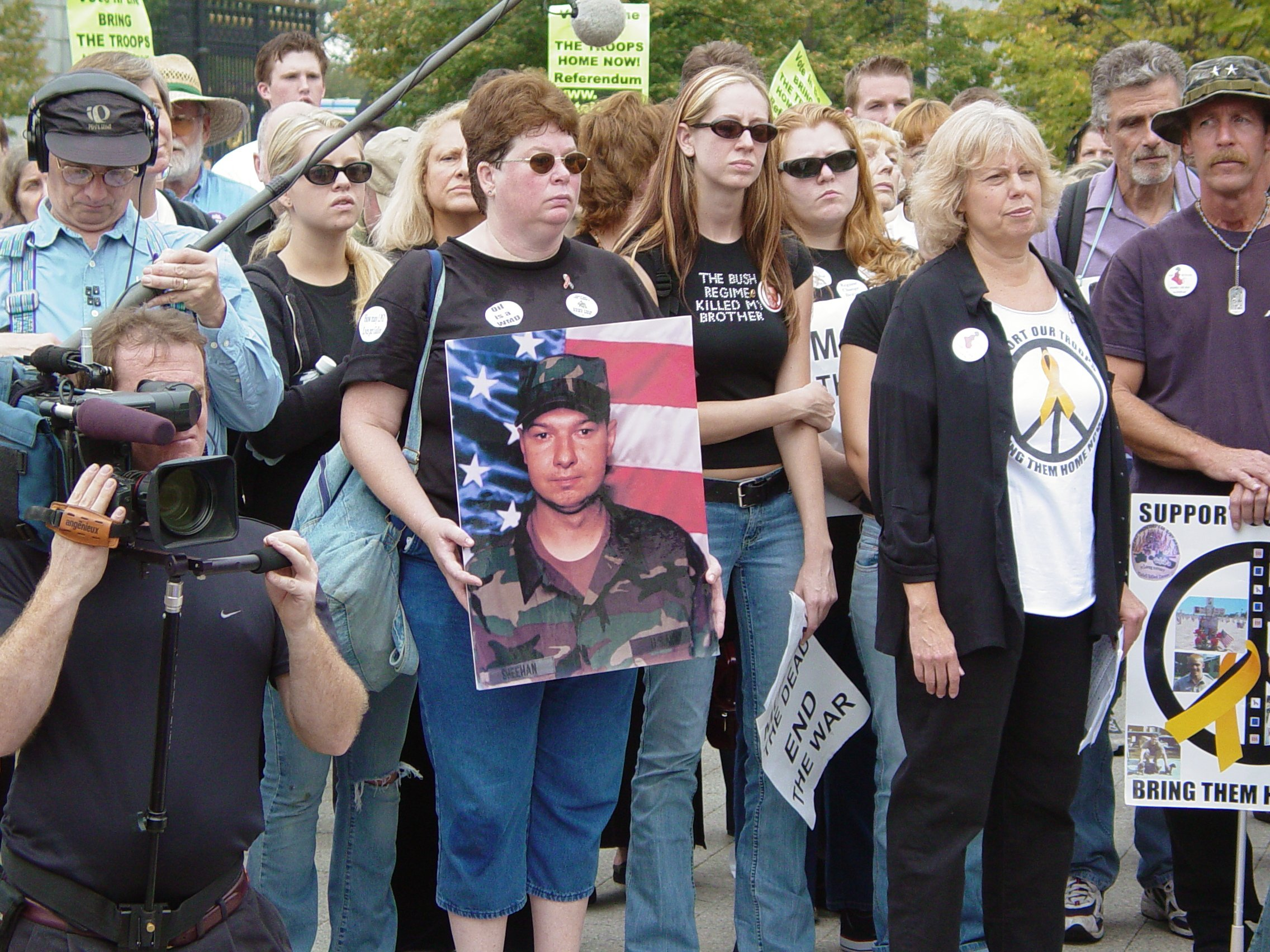
Friends and family of Cindy Sheehan hold a photo of Casey Sheehan at an anti-war demonstration in Arlington, Virginia on October 2, 2004.

Sheehan has said she initially questioned the urgency of the invasion of Iraq but did not become active in the antiwar effort until after her son's death. Sheehan and other military families met with President George W. Bush in June 2004 at Fort Lewis, near Tacoma, Washington, about three months after her son's death. In a June 24, 2004, interview with the Vacaville Reporter, published soon after the meeting, she stated, "We haven't been happy with the way the war has been handled. The president has changed his reasons for being over there every time a reason is proven false or an objective reached." She also stated that President Bush was "sincere about wanting freedom for the Iraqis. I know [he] feels pain for our loss. And I know he's a man of God." Sheehan gave another interview on October 4, 2004, stating that she did not understand the reasons for the Iraq invasion and never thought that Iraq posed an imminent threat to the United States. She further stated that her son's death had compelled her to speak out against the war.

For the presidential inauguration in January 2005, Sheehan traveled to Washington, D.C. to speak at the opening of "Eyes Wide Open: the Human Cost of War," a traveling exhibition created by the American Friends Service Committee that displays pairs of combat boots to represent U.S. military casualties. She also traveled with the exhibition to other locations and donated her son Casey's boots, stating, "Behind these boots is one broken-hearted family." Sheehan was one of the nine founding members of Gold Star Families for Peace, an organization she created in January 2005 with other families she met at the inauguration. It seeks to end U.S. presence in Iraq, and provides support for families of soldiers killed in Iraq.

Sheehan gained international attention in early August 2005, when she traveled to President Bush's Prairie Chapel Ranch, just outside Crawford, Texas, demanding a second meeting with the President. She told members of Veterans for Peace, "I'm gonna say, 'And you tell me, what the noble cause is that my son died for.' And if he even starts to say freedom and democracy, I'm gonna say, bullshit. You tell me the truth. You tell me that my son died for oil. You tell me that my son died to make your friends rich.... You tell me that, you don't tell me my son died for freedom and democracy." She also vowed not to pay her federal income tax for 2004 because that was the year her son was killed.

=== Camp Casey ===
On August 6, 2005, Sheehan arrived at the Crawford Peace House on a bus full of combat veterans, including Desert Storm Veteran Dennis Kyne and Camilo Mejía. They marched along a dirt road in the direction of The Bush Ranch. Stalled by law enforcement from walking all the way to the front door because the group refused to march as ordered in the Barr ditch, she created a makeshift camp that would be remembered as the "ditch". Three miles (5 km) from President Bush's Prairie Chapel Ranch near Crawford, Texas, Sheehan announced her intention to stay (sleeping in a pup tent at night) until she was granted a face-to-face meeting with the president. Sheehan started her protest the day the president started a planned five-week vacation. The encampment was publicized widely on behalf of Gold Star Families for Peace and Military Families Speak Out. A few days later, the media began referring to Sheehan's camp as "Camp Casey."

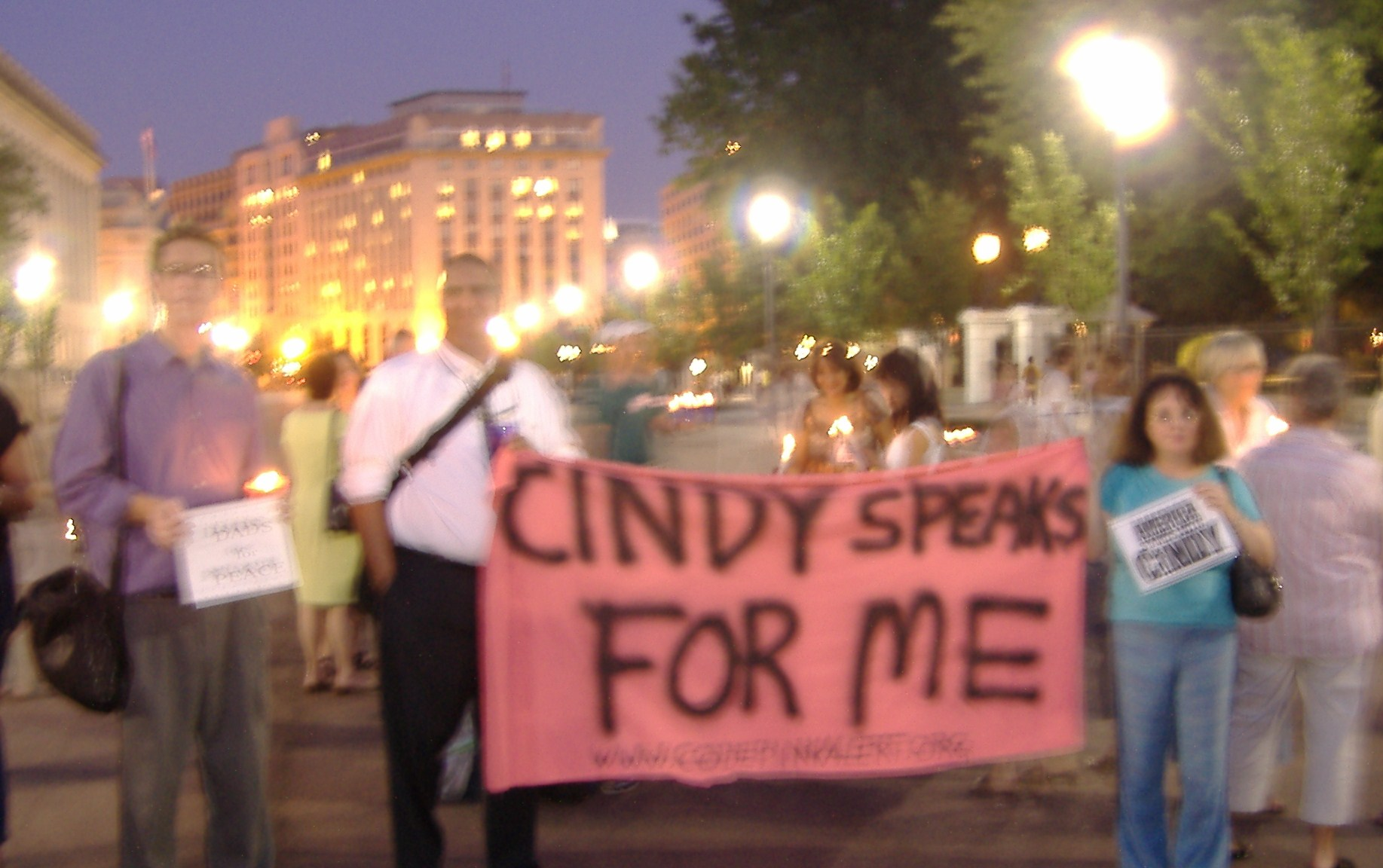
Members of White House vigil on August 17, 2005, in support of Cindy Sheehan's protest at President Bush's Crawford ranch

Sheehan spent most of the next four weeks in Crawford, drawing global media coverage. On some days as many as 1,500 supporters visited Camp Casey, including members of the U.S. Congress, as well as several notable actors, singers, and civil rights activists.

Gold Star Families for Peace, of which Sheehan is a founding member, released a TV commercial featuring Sheehan, broadcast on Crawford and Waco cable channels near Bush's ranch. The group conducted a walk to a police station just outside Bush's ranch and delivered a bundle of oversized letters written by them to First Lady Laura Bush, appealing to her as a mother to support their movement.

On August 16, Sheehan moved her camp closer to the Bush ranch after being offered the use of a piece of land owned by a supporter, Fred Mattlage.

In late August, Sheehan stated that she would continue to campaign against the Iraq war even if granted a meeting with Bush. She also announced the Bring Them Home Now Tour, to depart on September 1 and arrive in Washington, D.C., on September 24 for three days of demonstrations. The tour, which covered 42 cities in 26 states, was publicized by the Mintwood Media Collective, and garnered international media coverage. On the third day, Sheehan and about 370 other antiwar activists were arrested for demonstrating on the White House sidewalk.

Sheehan's actions led supporters such as Rev. Lennox Yearwood, CEO of the Hip Hop Caucus, to describe her as "the Rosa Parks of the antiwar movement." Sheehan also gained the label of "Peace Mom" from the mainstream media.

== Political activism ==
In September 2005, Sheehan moved into the Berkeley, California, home of Stephen Pearcy and Virginia Pearcy, where she lived for just over a year, during which time she wrote two books. Also that month, Sheehan met with Senator John McCain, and later called him a "warmonger." Between 2005 and 2007, Sheehan attended several antiwar events in Sacramento organized by the Pearcys. Also in September 2005, the Bring Them Home Now Tour was organized by Gold Star Families for Peace, Iraq Veterans Against the War, Military Families Speak Out, and Veterans For Peace. Inspired by Sheehan and frequently including Sheehan as a speaker, it was a rolling antiwar protest against the Iraq War, beginning in Crawford, Texas, traveling three routes across the country (with rallies along the way) and culminating in a rally in Washington, D.C., later in September 2005.

On October 24, 2005, Sheehan said that she planned to speak at the White House and then tie herself to the fence. She and 28 others were arrested in a sit-in at the White House on October 26.

Sheehan visited London in early December 2005 and was interviewed by BBC Radio 4 and by The Guardian. On December 10, Sheehan addressed the International Peace Conference, organized by the Stop the War Coalition. Later in the evening, she attended the London Premiere of Peace Mom, a play written by Dario Fo about her, in which the role of Sheehan was played by Frances de la Tour. On December 13, Sheehan traveled to Ireland, where she met Irish Foreign Affairs Minister Dermot Ahern. She voiced her objection to U.S. aircraft refueling at Shannon Airport, stating, "Your government, even though they didn't send troops to Iraq, are complicit in the crimes by allowing the planes to land and refuel."

On January 31, 2006, Sheehan wore a T-shirt reading "2,245 Dead. How many more?" to Bush's State of the Union address and was removed and arrested by Capitol Police.

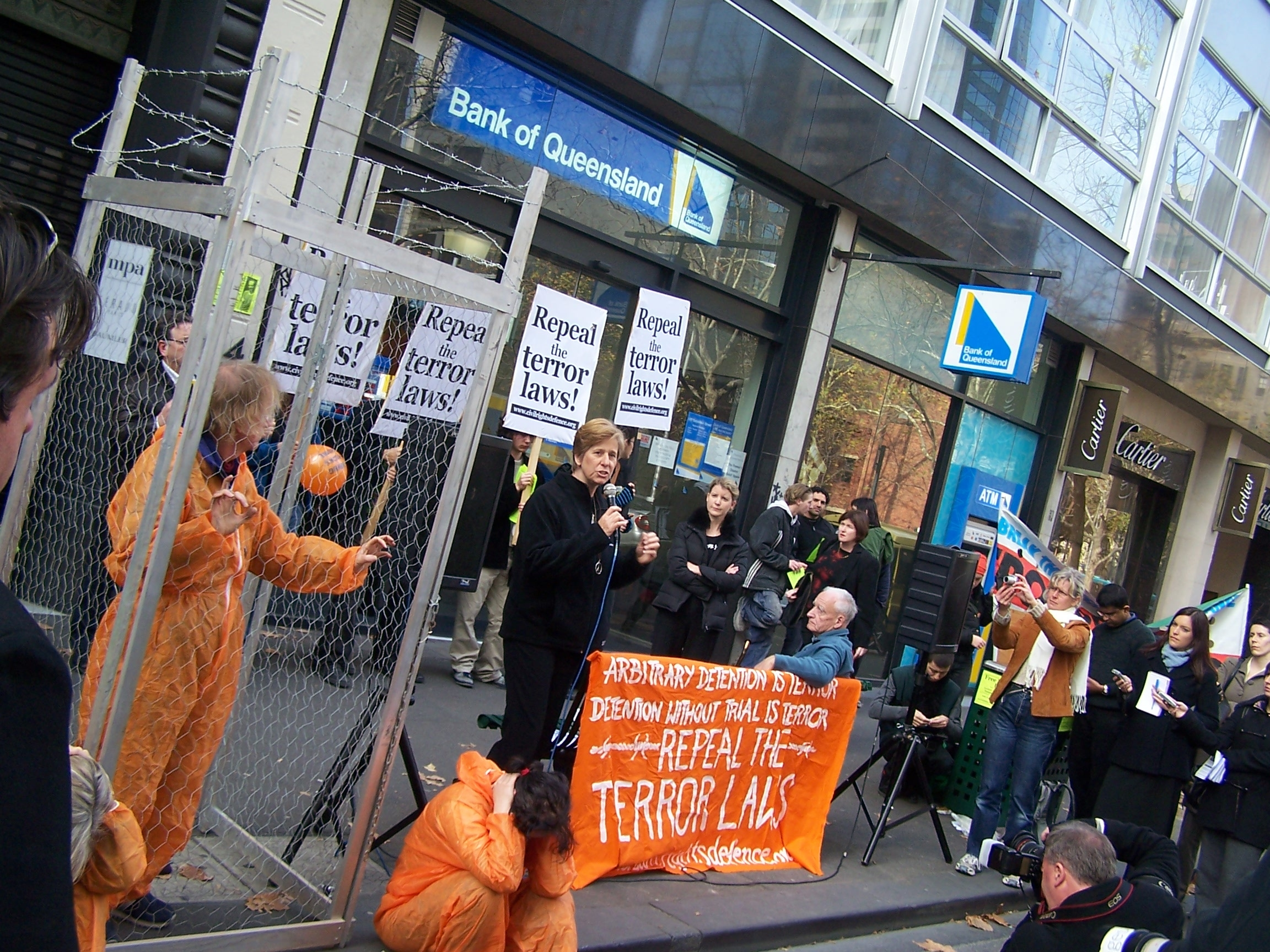
Sheehan in Melbourne speaking in support of David Hicks, May 2006.

On March 7, 2006, Sheehan was arrested in New York "after blocking the door to the U.S. Mission to the U.N. offices" during a protest with Iraqi women against the war.

Sheehan and Gold Star Families for Peace were awarded the 'Domestic Human Rights Award' by Global Exchange, an international human rights organization based in San Francisco.

Several organizations planned a hunger strike to begin on July 4, 2006; Sheehan stated she would participate. On July 5, Sheehan appeared on MSNBC's Hardball with Chris Matthews to discuss the war and her upcoming hunger strike. On the show, she called Bush "the biggest terrorist in the world" and "worse than Osama bin Laden," and conceded that she would rather live under Venezuela's Hugo Chávez than Bush. Later that month, Sheehan purchased 5 acres (20,000 m^{2}) of land in Crawford, Texas, near Bush's private residence.

On May 26 and May 28, 2007, Sheehan posted two messages to Daily Kos announcing that she was leaving the Democratic Party after the Democratic-controlled Congress passed a bill authorizing the continued funding of the war in Iraq. She also submitted her resignation as the "face" of the American antiwar movement, stating that she wanted to go home and be a mother to her surviving children. However, on July 3, 2007, in response to President Bush's commutation of Scooter Libby's sentence, she announced her return to activism. She focused on her congressional campaign in 2008.

In August 2009, Sheehan protested at Martha's Vineyard during President Barack Obama's stay there. According to ABC News: "Sheehan invoked Senator Ted Kennedy's passing as part of her message, noting that he was firmly antiwar and how he said his proudest vote as a senator was his 2002 vote against the Iraq war." On October 5, 2009, Sheehan was arrested with 60 others at the White House protesting President Obama's continuation of wars in Iraq and Afghanistan. She told CNN: "I think the mood of the country and the mood of our movement is getting a little bit more desperate, and [that] this will be the time to be able to translate our tireless activism and work for peace." On December 10, 2009, Sheehan protested on the streets of Oslo, Norway, as President Barack Obama accepted the Nobel Peace Prize. In 2009, she was awarded The US Peace Prize by the US Peace Memorial Foundation for “extraordinary and innovative antiwar activism."

On March 20, 2010, Sheehan was again arrested in front of the White House, along with seven others, after they refused to listen to orders by officers of the United States Park Police to clear the sidewalk on Pennsylvania Avenue. On July 12, Sheehan and four other activists were on trial in the Superior Court of the District of Columbia stemming from the arrests. The government decided not to try three others arrested that day, and had their cases dismissed. Sheehan and two others were acquitted of crossing a police line, while the other two were found guilty.

On May 2, 2011, Sheehan released a statement indicating that she considers the death of Osama bin Laden to be a hoax, stating: "If you believe the newest death of OBL, you're stupid." She referred to America as a "lying, murderous empire" and told Americans, whom she called "brainwashed," to "put [their] flags away."

In October 2011, Sheehan was arrested in Sacramento as part of an anti–Wall Street movement.

Although Sheehan agreed to run as the vice presidential nominee of the Socialist Party USA for the 2012 elections, the party's national convention voted on October 15, 2011, to block her candidacy, on the official grounds that she was not a member of the party. The nomination went to Alejandro Mendoza, of Texas.

In 2017, when the U.S. President Donald Trump was expected to announce the sending of thousands of additional troops, Sheehan feared that more opposition to the war would be only because of who occupies the presidency, stating, "If Trump announces that there will be a continued U.S. military presence or an increased presence, I am afraid any opposition from the 'left' will only be anti-Trump, because, of course, Obama escalated in Afghanistan and maintained that illegal war for the entire eight years of his presidency with not a peep from those same pro-DNC forces." Additionally, she believes "nothing but total withdrawal to give the people of Afghanistan autonomy over their own country will be acceptable" but said that she is concerned about the sincerity of possible protests.

Sheehan hosts a weekly radio show which began in 2009. She has interviewed activists and world leaders, including Howard Zinn, Ray McGovern, Ann Wright, and Hugo Chávez. Sheehan maintains a blog, "Cindy's Soapbox." Sheehan's blog was previously on Blogspot but in 2022, she announced that she moved it to Substack instead. The reasons Sheehan gave for moving her blog were the fact that she felt that the Blogspot software has become unwieldy in the 13 years that she used it and also for the fact that some of her posts were removed from the blog which she implied she considered censorship. Sheehan also stated that she will keep up the Blogspot page up permanently as an archive of her previous posts.

=== Refusal to pay taxes ===
In 2012, Sheehan was sued by the federal government for failure to pay back taxes. "I feel like I gave my son to this country in an illegal and immoral war. I'll never get him back," Sheehan said. "And, so, if they can give me my son back, then I'll pay my taxes. And that's not going to happen." Sheehan appeared in court on April 19, 2012, and in IRS offices on May 9, 2012, refusing to provide information on the basis of the First Amendment and the Fifth Amendment. The government dropped its case against her in February 2013.

== 2008 congressional campaign ==
Cindy Sheehan campaigns at an End the War Now! rally in San Francisco, October 2007

In July 2007, Sheehan announced that she would run against Speaker of the House Nancy Pelosi for representative of California's 8th District, based on Pelosi's failure to attempt impeachment of Bush. Up until her run for the U.S. Congress, Sheehan lived outside Pelosi's district, in Dixon, California; however, she moved to San Francisco's Mission District after declaring her candidacy. Earlier, in 2006, she had spoken of ambitions to challenge Dianne Feinstein for her seat in the United States Senate.

Sheehan ran on a platform of single-payer health care, media reform, overturning all free trade agreements, repealing the Patriot Act, renewable energy, nationalizing oil and electricity, ending the war on drugs, legalizing cannabis, ensuring all talks in the Middle East are fair to all parties, ending torture, closing Guantanamo Bay detention camp, overseas commitment to cleaning up Superfund sites, ending deregulation, ending No Child Left Behind, and legalizing same-sex marriage. Sheehan lost the 2008 election to the incumbent Pelosi. In a seven-way race, Sheehan came in second with 46,118 votes (16.14%) to Pelosi's 71.56%.

== 2012 vice-presidential campaign ==
In the summer of 2012, television personality Roseanne Barr named Sheehan as her running mate for the presidential nomination of the Peace and Freedom Party in the 2012 presidential election. Barr and Sheehan were nominated by that party as its presidential ticket on August 4, 2012. Sheehan had disagreements with Barr's views on policy, desire to campaign only online, and treatment of Green Party nominee Jill Stein, leading Sheehan to request that her name be taken off the Peace and Freedom Party ticket. Sheehan was told it was too late to have her name removed, so she instead announced that she would be leaving the campaign.

== 2014 California gubernatorial candidacy and campaign ==
On March 12, 2013 Marsha Feinland, state chair of California's Peace and Freedom Party, made the announcement that the central committee of the party had unanimously endorsed Cindy Sheehan for Governor of California in the 2014 election, should Sheehan choose to run. Sheehan formally announced her campaign for Governor of California at a news conference Tuesday, August 27, 2013, at the State Capitol in Sacramento.

Sheehan said she planned to unseat incumbent Gov. Jerry Brown, and to bring California "peace, economic equality and environmental sustainability," and reforms through an EPIC (End Poverty in California) program. Her EPIC campaign harkened to the End Poverty in California movement campaign of the 1934 California gubernatorial candidate Upton Sinclair. Sinclair garnered 879,537 votes in that race.

== Political positions ==
Sheehan has, through her own blog, described herself as a socialist. She has also criticized capitalism. In 2010, Sheehan changed her voter registration in California and became a member of the Peace and Freedom Party. Sheehan has expressed opposition to COVID-19 restrictions, mask mandates, and vaccine mandates. She published a paper about former New York Governor Andrew Cuomo's nursing home controversy.

In 2024, Sheehan signed an open letter in support of a trans-exclusionary activist who was excluded from a Jewish Voice for Peace action for "opposing trans rights."

== Personal life ==
In 1977, she married Patrick Sheehan, a sales representative, in Norwalk, California; they had four children, including Casey Sheehan (born in 1979), who was killed in action in Iraq on April 4, 2004. Patrick Sheehan filed for divorce on August 12, 2005, citing irreconcilable differences.

== Published works ==
- Dear President Bush. San Francisco: City Lights Publishers, 2006. ISBN 0872864545
- Peace Mom. San Francisco: City Lights Publishers, 2006. ISBN 074329792X

== See also ==
- Views on the 2003 invasion of Iraq
- Movement to impeach George W. Bush
- List of peace activists
- Reg Keys
