= Bring Them Home Now Tour =

2005 US anti-war protest

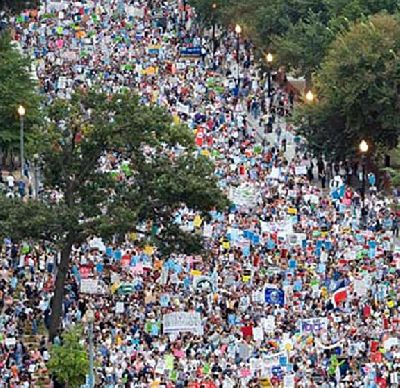
A crowd of 100,000 to 200,000 marches in Washington

The Bring Them Home Now Tour was a rolling anti-war protest against the Iraq War in the United States, beginning in Crawford, Texas, travelling three routes across the country (with rallies along the way) and culminating in a rally in Washington, D.C. in September 2005. The tour was organized by Gold Star Families for Peace, Iraq Veterans Against the War, Military Families Speak Out, and Veterans For Peace. It was inspired by and featured Cindy Sheehan as a speaker at many rallies. The three tour buses were purchased with donated money.

== Bus tour - Week 1 ==
- August 31, 2005: The bus tour Starts from Crawford, headed to Washington, D.C. following three legs - north, central and south.
- August 31, 2005: During a march in Austin, Texas, Sheehan says "I think it's important to connect these two things [Hurricane Katrina and the Iraq War]. We should be focused on America right now, not what's happening in Iraq with this natural disaster. It's important to have as many of our National Guard folks back here to support that effort."
- September 1, 2005: Bus tour stops at House Majority Leader Tom DeLay's office in Stafford, Texas and Resurrection Metropolitan Community Church in Houston for an evening anti-war rally. Sheehan is not able to meet with DeLay due to previous engagements.
- September 3, 2005: The anti-war bus tour arrives in Minneapolis, Minnesota where protesters link the Iraq War with the inability to respond to Hurricane Katrina. "People are dying in Louisiana and New Orleans right now" because Bush, a "warmonger," is intent on "looting" oil in Iraq", said state Rep. Keith Ellison, DFL-Minneapolis.

== Bus tour - Week 2 ==
- September 7, 2005: North bus tour stops in Chicago, Illinois and protests in front of House Speaker Dennis Hastert's office. Meanwhile, the Central and South tours make stops near Cincinnati, Ohio and Dothan, Alabama. to discuss why the war in Iraq is wrong.
- September 10, 2005: Sheehan brings her anti-war message to Stone Mountain, Georgia saying "I had given up on my country, but we remembered what we had forgotten after almost five years of a virtual dictatorship — that we the people have the power"
- September 10, 2005: Southern bus tour continues to Athens, Georgia and brings the message "to support troops, to bring them home, and to support them once they get home.”
- September 11, 2005: Sheehan rallies with the central bus tour in Pittsburgh, Pennsylvania. Criticizing Bush's policies in Iraq, she says "Every time Bush talks he should be removed from office." and "None of the chicken hawks have served our country the way our children have."
- September 11, 2005: The northern bus tour makes a stop near Detroit, Michigan and has a large turnout.
- September 12, 2005: The southern bus tour stops in Savannah, Georgia and in Columbia, South Carolina where Sheehan said before a small crowd "You know we had over 12,000 Americans come to Camp Casey but we thought that we’d bring Camp Casey to America and also to Congress to start holding them accountable for the war in Iraq" and "This was a war that was based on lies" ... "It was wrong for us to invade Iraq. It's wrong for us to occupy Iraq and we need to bring our troops home." A few protesters held signs that read "Sheehan does not speak for me" and "Support the Troops" were also at the rally.

== Bus tour - Week 3 ==
- September 15, 2005: Sheehan cancels her trip to upstate New York so that she can have time to help Hurricane Katrina victims. The north bus tour events will still go on as scheduled without Sheehan.
- September 19, 2005: New York Police break up a rally in Union Square during a speech by Cindy Sheehan for the absence of a sound permit. Organizer Paul Zulkowitz is arrested.

== Bus tour - Week 4 ==
- September 21, 2005: Caravan stopped by Capitol Police two blocks from the United States Capitol in Washington, D.C. Bomb-sniffing dogs are used to inspect vehicles, which officers stated was standard practice for large vehicles near the Capitol.

== Washington D.C. rally ==
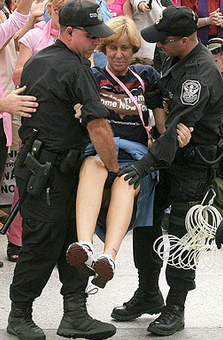
Cindy Sheehan arrested

- September 24, 2005: A crowd estimated at 100,000 to 200,000 rallies at the Ellipse, then marches around the White House and along Pennsylvania Avenue to the National Mall. The rally, lasting all day and night, includes a music marathon, and many speeches. Meanwhile, a comparatively very small crowd of only around 400 protests the anti-war march claiming they represent the silent majority. Organizers had hoped that as many as 20,000 people would turn out for the counter-protest.
- September 26, 2005: Sheehan and approximately 370 other protesters are arrested outside the White House after refusing to move when asked three times to do so by police. Organizers of the protest indicated prior to the incident that some participants intended to get arrested. Sheehan is the first of the protesters at the scene to be arrested. She, and the 383 others arrested with her, are charged with demonstrating without a permit, a misdemeanor.
