= Arlington West: The Film =

- Directed by: Peter Dudar; Sally Marr
- Written by: Peter Dudar; Sally Marr
- Cinematography: David Leitner
- Music by: Michael Hedges
- Release date: 2006
- Running time: 74 minutes
- Country: United States
- Language: English

Arlington West: The Film is a 2006 documentary about the Iraq War by Peter Dudar and Sally Marr. The title refers to Arlington West, the "temporary cemeteries" in Santa Barbara and Santa Monica, California which serve as memorials to those who have been killed in Iraq.

== Background ==
The film features 105 interviews, mostly with young soldiers who have served in Iraq, talking about their experiences there. It also features members of Gold Star Families for Peace, whose sons or daughters died in Iraq. Among these parents are Cindy Sheehan, Fernando Suarez, Jane Bright, Bill Mitchell, Vickie Castro, Nadia McCaffrey, and Karen Meredith.

== Endorsements ==
The film has been notably praised by historian Howard Zinn, U.S. Congressman John Murtha, author Chalmers Johnson, filmmaker Haskell Wexler, and anti-war activists Medea Benjamin and Frank Dorrel.
