= Deather =

The term deather or deathers has been used to refer to:

- The rationing of healthcare in the United States; see Health care reform debate in the United States#Rationing of care
- The belief that Osama bin Laden may not be dead; see Death of Osama bin Laden conspiracy theories
