= Fernando Suarez del Solar =

Mexican peace activist

Fernando Suárez del Solar (born December 8, 1955) is a Mexican-American peace activist.

== Life ==
Suárez was born in Tenango del Aire in the State of Mexico, approximately 50 kilometres (30 mi) southeast of Mexico City. His father was a high-ranking government official in the Mexican government from the late 1950s into the early 1970s. He grew up in Mexico City and the city of Puebla, where he attended several schools including the Universidad Militar Latino Americana; he eventually studied law at the UNAM.

Suárez moved his family to Tijuana after his father's death. It was near the border on the San Diego side that his son, Jesús Alberto Suárez del Solar Navarro, was approached by U.S. military recruiters, who suggested that military service would allow him to pursue a career in law enforcement. The Suárez family relocated in 1999 to Escondido, California, so that his son could attend high school and enlist in the U.S. Marines as a "green-card soldier." Suárez became a U.S. citizen on July 3, 1997.

Jesús, then a 20-year-old U. S. Marine Corps lance corporal, died in Iraq on March 27, 2003, the first soldier of Mexican origin and the fifth Hispanic soldier killed in the invasion of Iraq. Suárez subsequently founded the Guerrero Azteca for Peace Project, an antiwar initiative promoting peace and alternatives to the military. He traveled to Iraq in December 2003, visiting the place where his son died after stepping on a cluster bomb that had been dropped by U.S. forces.

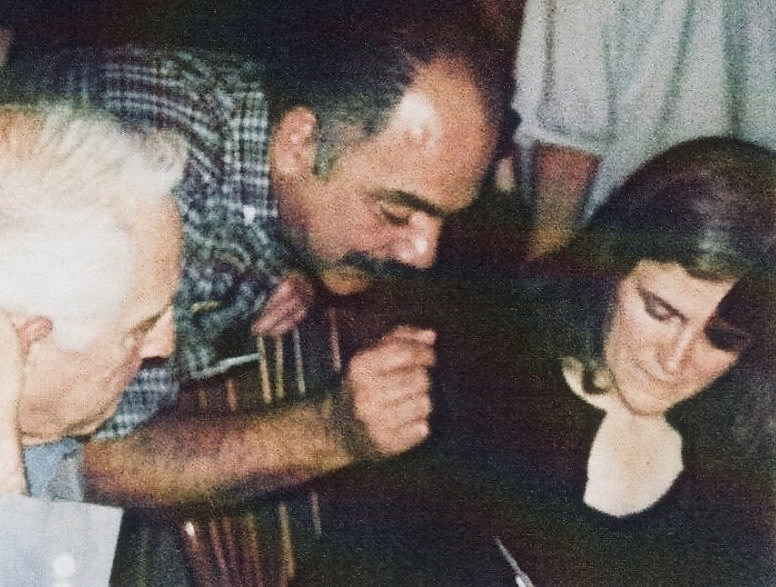

In 2006, he led an anti-war march from Tijuana to San Francisco, modeled after the Peregrinación (Pilgrimage/March) to Sacramento led by Cesar Chavez and the United Farm Workers in 1966. He was an active supporter of Latino/a active duty military members such as Pablo Paredes and Camilo Mejía, who protested against the war. In 2020, he joined a group of Gold Star families with an open letter to protest Donald Trump's treatment in the media of Gold Star parents Khizr and Ghazala Khan.

== See also ==
- Addicted To War
- Veterans For Peace
- Ron Kovic
- Documentary Film by Peter Lilienthal
