= Crawford Texas Peace House =

Anti-war organization

The Crawford Texas Peace House is an anti-war activist organization located in Crawford, Texas near the home of President George W. Bush. It gained international attention in August 2005 during the protest of Cindy Sheehan, who is serving on the board of directors.

In March 2007, it came to light that the Crawford Peace House had lost its corporate charter due to required paperwork not being submitted to the state since May 2006. In addition, former Peace House member Sara Oliver claimed that several hundreds of thousands of dollars in donations were unaccounted for. Oliver held the right to use the group's name, and demanded an investigation. The name was then changed to the Crawford Texas Peace House.

Peace House co-founder John Wolf said that $285,000 was raised in 2005 and was spent legitimately.
