= Camillo Mac Bica =

American philosopher, poet, activist, and author

Dr. Camillo Mac Bica
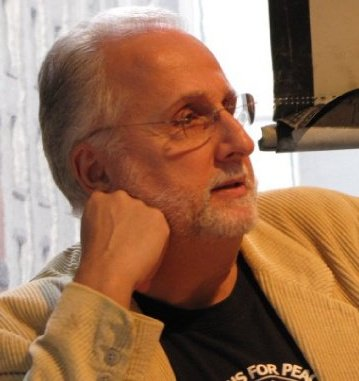
- Born: 7 January 1947 (age 79); Brooklyn, New York
- Occupations: Philosopher, poet, author, activist
- Employer: School of Visual Arts

Camillo Mac Bica is an American philosopher, poet, activist, and author.

== Biography ==
Bica was born on January 7, 1947, in Brooklyn. He received a Bachelor of Arts from Long Island University in 1968 and a Master of Arts from New York University in 1986. He then attended the Graduate Center of the City University of New York, where he received a Master's of Philosophy in 1993 and a Ph.D in Philosophy in 1995.

Since 1990, he has served as a professor at the School of Visual Arts (SVA) in New York City, where he teaches courses in philosophy, peace studies, and war. In 2003, he was given SVA's Distinguished Scholar-Teacher Award.

In 1964, Bica entered the United States Marine Corps Platoon Leaders Class and upon graduation from college in 1968 was commissioned a 2nd lieutenant. He spent three years on active duty as a Marine Corps officer, serving 13 months with the 26th Marine Infantry Regiment in the Vietnam War.

Upon his discharge from active duty, Bica spent many years recovering from his service in Vietnam. He eventually founded—with a number of other Veterans, and coordinating for six years—the successful Veterans Self-Help Initiative (also known as the HOOTCH Program) at the Department of Veterans Affairs Medical Center in Brooklyn. He is a long-time member of the Vietnam Veterans Against the War, and coordinator of the Long Island chapter of Veterans For Peace.

Bica has authored over fifty articles dealing with social policy, the ethics of war, posttraumatic stress disorder, moral injury, and related topics published in the Humanist Magazine; numerous alternative news sites such as Truthout.org, OpEd News, Common Dreams, and AlterNet; and numerous philosophical journals.

The first installment of Bica’s War Legacy Series, Worthy of Gratitude: Why Veterans May Not Want to be Thanked for their Service in War, was published in 2015. The second book in the series, Beyond PTSD: The Moral Casualties of War, was published in early 2016.

In 2010, Bica testified at the Truth Commission on Conscience in War at the Riverside Church in New York City.

He currently serves on the National Advisory Board of the Soul Repair Center, a think tank dedicated to research and public education about recovery from moral injury from war located at Brite Divinity School in Fort Worth, Texas.

== Books ==
- 2015: Worthy of Gratitude: Why Veterans May Not Want to be Thanked for their Service in War. ISBN 978-0-9968207-0-7.
- 2016: Beyond PTSD: The Moral Casualties of War. ISBN 978-0-9968207-1-4

== Articles ==
- Meeting With the Enemy: Vietnam From a Vietnamese Perspective
- Don't Thank Me for My Service
- Blood On All Our Hands: Don't Thank Me For My Service Redux
- When Soldiers Say No To War
- Protected Speech?
- Inappropriate Art: "Open Casket" and "Portraits of Courage"
- Whose "Truth" Matters Most When We Recount the War in Vietnam?
- “Thank You for Saving My Son From All the Grief and Pain!”
