= Veterans for Peace =

American anti-war organization

- logo
- Founded: July 9, 1985; 41 years ago
- Founded at: Maine
- Website: https://www.veteransforpeace.org/

Veterans for Peace is a nonprofit membership organization founded in 1985. The group works to promote alternatives to war. Initially made up of US military veterans of World War II, the Korean War and the Vietnam War - later including veterans of the Gulf War, the War in Afghanistan and the Iraq War - as well as peacetime veterans and non-veterans, it has since spread overseas and had an active offshoot in the United Kingdom called Veterans for Peace UK from 2011 to 2022. The British offshoot of VFP, Veterans for Peace UK, was permanently shut down in August, 2022.

The organization has opposed the military policies of the United States, NATO, and Israel, and has opposed military actions and threats to Russia, Iraq, Afghanistan, Iran, Libya and Syria.

== Foundation ==
The stated objective of the group is as follows:

We draw on our personal experiences and perspectives gained as veterans to raise public awareness of the true costs and consequences of militarism and war - and to seek peaceful, effective alternatives."

Veterans For Peace was founded and incorporated as a non-profit organization in the state of Maine on July 8, 1985. It was approved by the Internal Revenue Service as a 501(c)(3) tax-exempt educational organization that year. It was also recognized as a United Nations non-governmental organization (NGO) in 1990. VFP's first permanent representative to the United Nations was Benjamin Weintraub of Staten Island, New York, who was seated in 1990. Chapters and members are active in communities throughout the United States, Puerto Rico, and Viet Nam. National conventions are held annually and members communicate through quarterly newsletters as well as daily listserve news, online discussion groups as well as the national and chapter websites. Veterans for Peace has a national office in Saint Louis, Missouri and members across the country, both organized in chapters and at-large.

At least one unrelated anti-war group from the Vietnam War era had a similar name: "Veterans for Peace in Viet-Nam" participated in a number of demonstrations in 1967. And another demonstration in Washington, DC. Yet another group with a similar name may also have existed at the time of the Korean War.

== Anti-war activities ==
VFP first began organizing major anti-war protests in 1987 when, on Easter Sunday, hundreds of its members marched on President Reagan's "Western White House" in California, and Vice President Bush's vacation home in Kennebunkport, Maine, protesting U.S. support for the Nicaraguan Contra counter-revolution.

Starting in 2003, Veterans for Peace became a major participant of protests against the Iraq War.

In 2004, its Southern California chapters began installing Arlington West, a weekly "temporary cemetery" in tribute to those killed in the war in Iraq, each Sunday in Santa Barbara and Santa Monica, California.

In August 2005, Veterans For Peace Member, Desert storm veteran Dennis Kyne lead a group of veterans in support of Cindy Sheehan, the mother of a US Army soldier killed in Iraq who embarked on an extended anti-war vigil near the ranch of US President George W. Bush in Crawford, Texas. On August 5, 2005, Sheehan spoke at the organization's 20th annual convention in Dallas, Texas, just a day before traveling to Crawford to begin her vigil. Members traveled from California to install an Arlington West display at "Camp Casey", the site of Sheehan's protest.

In March 2006, Veterans For Peace and coalition partners Iraq Veterans Against the War, Gold Star Families for Peace, and Military Families Speak Out joined with Hurricane Katrina survivors and the relief and rebuilding organizations Savin' Ourselves After Katrina, Common Ground Collective, and Bayou Liberty Relief, as well as a number of African-American churches along the Gulf Coast on a march from Mobile, Alabama to New Orleans, Louisiana. Originally titled the Veterans and Survivors March, it quickly took on the moniker of Walkin' to New Orleans, in tribute to the famous song by Fats Domino. The marchers traveled the Gulf Coast advocating an immediate end to the war in Iraq and redirection of funds to help rebuild areas Katrina damaged not only in New Orleans, but also in Mississippi, and Alabama.

According to Vets for Peace - Peace Action Network, "The military has a clear and dangerous presence at Milwaukee's Summerfest" (June 26 - July 6, 2008). "One exhibit is especially offensive: kids as young as 13 years old can aim automatic weapons from atop a humvee at a large screen to virtually kill people."

Veterans for Peace participated in an anti-war demonstration held on the White House sidewalk in December 2010; dozens were arrested, including Ray McGovern, Daniel Ellsberg, Chris Hedges and a number of Veterans for Peace members.

In 2016, the US Peace Memorial Foundation awarded The US Peace Prize to the group “In recognition of heroic efforts to expose the causes and costs of war and to prevent and end armed conflict.”

== Issues ==
Veterans for Peace takes positions on a number of issues which generally oppose the military policy of the United States, NATO, and its allies against nations such as Iran, Russia, Palestine and Syria.

=== Veterans affairs ===
Members and chapters actively participate in efforts to save VA healthcare and defend veterans rights; to provide counseling through the GI Rights Hotline to active duty military needing assistance; and providing alternative information to counter military recruiters in the schools.

In April 1986, VFP protested the judicial execution of David Funchess, a Vietnam War veteran who was electrocuted in Florida for a double murder despite exhibiting signs of severe post-traumatic stress disorder from his service that may have affected his moral culpability in the murders he committed. VFP set up a round-the-clock vigil at the Florida Vietnam War Memorial in the days leading up to Funchess's execution. Members of VFP called Funchess a "forgotten man" and protested that neither Florida Governor Bob Graham nor the state and federal courts had taken Funchess's PTSD into enough consideration when refusing to commute his death sentence to life imprisonment.

=== Central America ===
In the 1980s, VFP opposed US-sponsored wars in Central America. On Easter Sunday, Apr 19, 1987, VFP members marched on President Reagan's Western White House in California, and Vice President Bush's vacation home in Kennebunkport, Maine, protesting U.S. intervention in Central America. From May 4–18, 1987, sixteen members of VFP representing eight states traveled through Guatemala, Honduras and Nicaragua conducting site visits and interviews with high level government, military, religious and private sector elders, and talking with many average citizens. Following their return, they published a 40-page delegation report that was distributed to 5,000 opinion leaders in the United States including members of the U.S. Senate and House of Representatives, the heads of many government offices and agencies, church, labor, and educational leaders, and media pace setters. In 1988, many VFP members participated in the Veterans Peace Convoy which was intended to truck medical and humanitarian aid to the suffering children of Nicaragua. Though the convoy was stopped by U.S. Customs and Treasury officials in Texas at the Laredo border checkpoint, on June 15, 1988, the vehicles were off-loaded into containers at a Texas port facility and about 95% of the cargo reached its destination in Nicaragua. In July 1988, VFP member Joe Ryan, an environmental scientist, of Tallahassee, Florida, established VFP's Nicaragua Environmental Science Project. Ryan spent two years working in Nicaragua training pollution control teams how to correct water contamination problems. The project was credited with significantly reducing the nation's infant mortality rate. Also in July 1988, VFP member Randy Parent of Caribou, Maine, drove a truckload of smelting and casting equipment to Guatemala where he established the Pro-Tierra Machine Tool Project to train members of several indigenous tribes how to make farm tools for the 100,000 members of the Pro-Tierra land reform movement. VFP regularly sends election observers to Guatemala, Honduras, Nicaragua and El Salvador.

=== Yugoslav wars ===
Within a year of the start of the Yugoslav Wars in 1991, it was announced the hospitals in several cities were no longer functional, and thousands of refugees had fled to the mountains. As the refugees were ill-equipped to face the coming winter, many were expected to perish. VFP's UN-NGO representative Ben Weintraub was instructed to offer U.N. officials whatever assistance VFP could provide in helping to deliver medical and humanitarian aid. Following discussions with the International Organization for Migration (IOM), another UN-NGO, the VFP National Office began contacting hospitals around the U.S. requesting pro bono services for any war wounded children that could be evacuated. Within weeks VFP had secured pro bono space and services for over 100 wounded children, but IOM had been able to evacuate very few due to Serbian, Croatian, and U.N. political constraints. In response, VFP organized the Children of War Rescue Project, and with assistance from contacts in the U.K., chief among them John Morrison of the Ex-Services Campaign for Nuclear Disarmament, and over 200 other British volunteers, a 63 vehicle convoy including 50 ambulances was staged at Brighton, England. Seven VFP volunteers including three physicians also joined the convoy that traveled almost non-stop for five days and nights. The convoy stopped only to regroup in Croatia. A Spanish battalion of U.N. protection forces assisted with armored vehicles in the evacuation of over 22 wounded children from East Mostar, Bosnia, including at least one family member accompanying each child. The children were airlifted to Ancona, Italy, and once stabilized, from there to hospitals throughout western Europe and the United States. In all, pro bono space and medical services were provided for about 50 wounded Bosnian, Croatian, and Serbian children through the project.

=== War on terror ===
In the immediate aftermath of 9/11, VFP called for restraint while agreeing that: "...the hijacked airplane attacks on the World Trade Towers and the Pentagon a grievous assault upon innocence; a cause for outrage, sadness and disbelief....At this critical point, we believe it is essential to recognize that terrorists do not represent, nor are representative, of any community or country as a whole. We must not allow terrorism the power to create fear, suspicion and hatred -- or to direct our nation's domestic and foreign policies. We must not surrender to the cycle of retaliatory violence these angry people would push us into. Instead, we must come together and support each other, with faith and trust." Veterans For Peace seeks to protect civil liberties that they believe are threatened by the Patriot Act and other similar legislation.

=== War in Iraq and Afghanistan ===
When the U.S. government threatened invasion of Iraq, VFP conducted public forums, met with elected representatives and participated in marches to express its opposition. As the war began, VFP gathered in Washington, DC, with other veterans groups for Operation Dire Distress. The organization participated in the Bring Them Home Now campaign and supports the Iraq Veterans Against the War.

Local chapters continue to conduct educational forums, demonstrations, and ongoing Iraq memorial displays such as Arlington West (portrayed in the documentary Arlington West: The Film) to remember the growing human cost of the war, to end the occupation, and to bring U.S. troops home.

VFP Chapter 14 in Gainesville, Florida has for the last eight years installed a display of small headstone replicas along a one-mile stretch of road in town which they call the Memorial Mile. Rows of 4 "tombstones" and columns of about 1 1/2-mile long represent every person killed since the beginning of war in Afghanistan to the very day of installation. Every single marker can be located for a friend or loved one to visit, and often remembrances or flowers are left by friends and relatives. From Sat. Morning to Monday evening on Memorial Day weekend VFP members and volunteers guard the memorial in shifts.

=== Impeachment of George W. Bush ===
In 2005 and 2007, VFP called for the impeachment of President Bush. In a letter sent to each member of the U.S. House and Senate, Veterans For Peace stated that "this administration's war on Iraq, in addition to being increasingly unpopular among Americans, is an unmistakable violation of our Constitution and federal law which you have sworn to uphold. In our system, the remedy for such high crimes is clear: this administration must be impeached."

=== Israel-Palestine ===
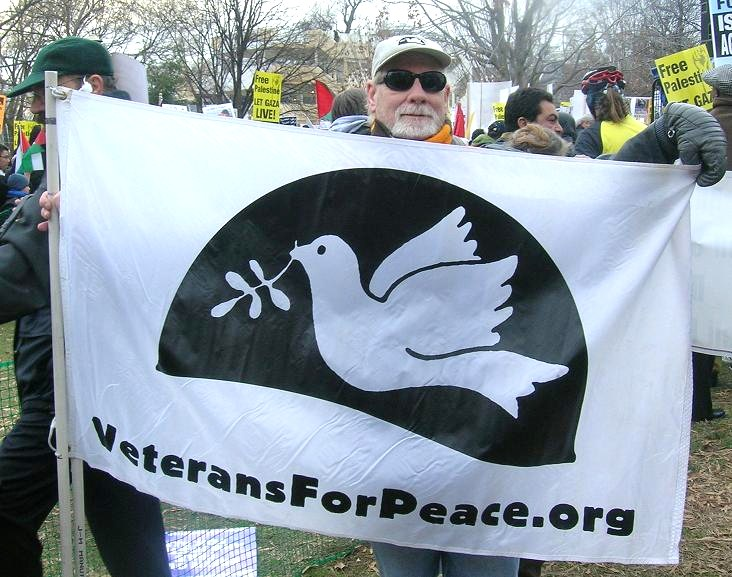
Veterans for Peace members at January 2009 protest vs. Israeli attacks on Gaza

Veterans For Peace issued a statement on Israel's 2006 invasion of Lebanon condemning the targeting of civilians by both sides and the "unjustified and totally disproportionate use of force and violence by the IDF (Israel Defense Forces)." In 2009 it issued a statement against Israel's attacks on Gaza condemning attacks on civilians both sides and stating "Bombings, rocket attacks, blockading medical supplies and military invasions will not lead to peace and security but will perpetuate the cycle of death, destruction, fear and insecurity among the people of all countries, including the U.S."

VFP was a sponsor for the Boston March for Palestine which demanded to "Free Palestine! No war on Iran or Syria! and Boycott Israel!" along with the Boston Coalition for Palestinian Rights and the Palestine Task Force of United for Justice with Peace. Members of the Palestine Working Group support remembrance of Al Nakba, and have made visits to Gaza and participated in "efforts to break the blockade of essential supplies to the area, including the Gaza Flotilla".

=== War against Iran ===
VFP agrees with the Iranian complaint that NATO seeks to "surround and threaten the nation of Iran". In 2012, the group stated that "Iran does not have a nuclear bomb. The U.S. intelligence agencies unanimously confirm this and say that Iran has not made the decision to build a nuclear weapon. Yet Iran has three neighbors that possess nuclear arsenals—India, Israel, and Pakistan." VFP endorsed United for Peace and Justice position against a War against Iran.

=== Humanitarian intervention in Syria and Libya ===
In 2012, VFP opposed military “humanitarian intervention” in Libya and in Syria as "opposition to all war is the official position of VFP because we know that peace cannot be realized by waging war."

=== Drones ===
Veterans For Peace joined Code Pink, World Can't Wait and Afghans For Peace to protest Drones in Chicago in 2012. On their national calendar, April 2013 was marked as the "No Drone" action month. Chapters across the nation held actions, protesting the use of drones.

=== NATO ===
VFP has called for the dissolution of the North Atlantic Treaty Organization as a "NATO has always been a war-making institution lacking in accountability to the peoples of the nations it claims to represent." VFP states that NATO has waged wars of aggression against Yugoslavia, Iraq, Afghanistan, and Libya. VFP states that NATO maintains nuclear weapons in violation of the Nuclear Nonproliferation Treaty. They back Russia's protest that Russia is threatened by missile base construction on its borders. VFP cites Saudi Arabia, Bahrain and Mubarak as examples where NATO did not address human rights abuses by dictators who supported NATO, and charges that NATO supports "Israel's expansionist agenda".

=== Agent Orange ===
VFP works with other Vietnam veterans, Vietnamese-Americans, and the Vietnam Agent Orange Relief and Responsibility Campaign (VAORRC) to secure justice and compensation for the Vietnamese victims of dioxin-contaminated Agent Orange and other herbicides that were sprayed over more than 1/8 of the land of southern Vietnam, Laos and Cambodia during the American portion of the Vietnam War.

=== School of the Americas ===
Each year VFP members from across the country go to Fort Benning, Georgia, to demonstrate for the closing of the Army's controversial School of the Americas, a training center for thousands of soldiers from Latin American countries which VFP identifies as having "long records of human rights abuses".

=== Korea ===
After revelations of the massacres of civilians by U.S. soldiers during the Korean War, VFP sent several fact-finding delegations to investigate these allegations and bring the hidden history of that war before the public. They continue to work for an end to that conflict through their Korea Peace Campaign.

=== Vieques ===
The VFP has actively supported the end of the U.S. Navy's use of the island-municipality of Vieques, Puerto Rico for bombing target practice. VFP continues to support current efforts for cleaning up the environment.

=== Colombia ===
VFP sent fact-finding delegations to Colombia and educated Americans about US military involvement, the murder of union leaders by para-militaries and other human rights abuses, including the use of harmful chemical defoliants in the war on drugs.

== Government monitoring and infiltration ==
According to FOIA documents obtained by the ACLU in 2006, VFP was among the peace groups targeted by FBI monitoring and infiltration by the FBI and local law enforcement terrorism task forces that targeted environmental, anti-war and faith-based groups.

== In fiction ==
The former British offshoot of Veterans for Peace, Veterans for Peace UK (2011–2022), was fictionalized in Bodyguard as "Veterans Peace Group". The fictional British peace group even used the same logo as the real group Veterans for Peace, apparently without permission according to a statement by Veterans for Peace UK.

== Notable members ==
- Bruce Beyer
- David Cline
- Camillo Mac Bica
- James B. Burkholder
- Brian Willson
- Utah Phillips

== See also ==
- Cindy Sheehan
- Ron Kovic
- Coffee Strong
- Vietnam Veterans Against the War
- Iraq Veterans Against the War
- List of anti-war organizations
- Scott Olsen (VFP/Occupy injury)
- Soldiers in Revolt: GI Resistance During the Vietnam War, book about soldier & sailor resistance during the Vietnam War
