= Stephen Pearcy (activist) =

American activist

Stephen Pearcy (born March 4, 1960) is an American probate, estate planning, income tax, and business transactions attorney in Sacramento, California.

== Biography ==
In 1999 and 2000, during the dot-com bubble, Pearcy was a corporate attorney at Gray Cary Ware & Freidenrich LLP (now DLA Piper) in Palo Alto, and focused on venture capital financing and public offering transactions.

In February 2005, Pearcy, who had not been known for being politically outspoken, made national news after displaying a stuffed American soldier's uniform hung with a noose, at his home, with the words: "Your Tax Dollars at Work." After someone tore down that display, he replaced it with a similar display with the words: "Bush Lied, I Died." This was also later torn down. Both instances of vandalism occurred while TV news crews were present and were captured on film, but the Sacramento District Attorney’s office declined to prosecute the vandals. Pearcy eventually won a US$5,000 judgment against one of the vandals, and he received an out-of-court settlement for $3,500 from another.

In August 2005, Pearcy made national news again when he exhibited a painting at the California Department of Justice in Sacramento showing a star-spangled map of the United States being flushed down a toilet. The painting included the words: "T'anks to Mr. Bush!" The art exhibit was controversial and generated a protest and counterprotest event that once again included supporters of the exhibition facing off with opponents of the exhibition.
