= Osama bin Laden death conspiracy theories =

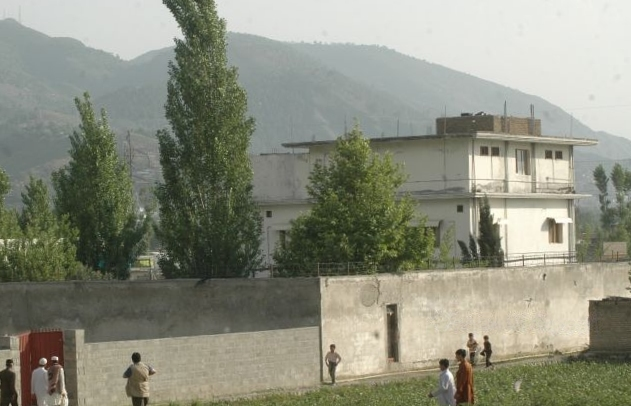
Bin Laden's compound

The death of Osama bin Laden on May 2, 2011, gave rise to various conspiracy theories, hoaxes and rumors. These include the ideas that he had died earlier, or that he lived beyond the reported date. Doubts about bin Laden's death were fueled by the U.S. military's disposal of his body at sea, the decision to not release any photographic or DNA evidence of bin Laden's death to the public, the contradicting accounts of the incident (with the official story on the raid appearing to change or directly contradict previous assertions), and the 25-minute blackout during the raid on bin Laden's compound during which a live feed from cameras mounted on the helmets of the U.S. special forces was cut off.

Within hours, an image purporting to show a dead bin Laden was broadcast on Pakistani television. Although the story was picked up by much of the British press, as well the Associated Press, it was swiftly removed from websites after it was exposed as a fake on Twitter.

On May 4, the Obama administration announced it would not release any images of bin Laden's dead body. The administration said it had considered releasing the photos to dispel rumors of a hoax, at the risks of perhaps prompting another attack by al-Qaeda and of releasing very graphic images to people who might find them disturbing. Several photos of the aftermath of the raid were given to Reuters by an anonymous Pakistani security official, but though all appeared to be authentic, they were taken after the U.S. forces had left and none of them included evidence regarding bin Laden's fate.

On May 6, it was reported that an al-Qaeda website acknowledged bin Laden's death. On May 11, Republican senator and Senate Armed Services Committee member Jim Inhofe stated he had viewed "gruesome" photographs of bin Laden's corpse, and later confirmed that the body "was him", adding, "He's history".

On May 21, 2015, journalist Seymour Hersh published a report claiming that Pakistan had kept bin Laden under house arrest since 2006, that the U.S. had learned of bin Laden's location through a Pakistani intelligence official and not through tracking a courier, and that elements of the Pakistani military aided the U.S. in killing bin Laden. The White House denied Hersh's report.

== Previous lack of physical evidence ==
The primary source of skepticism about the U.S. government's story has been its own refusal to provide any physical evidence to substantiate its claim. Although the Abbottabad raid has been described in great detail by U.S. officials, no physical evidence constituting actual proof of his death has been offered to the public, neither to journalists nor to independent third parties who have requested this information through the Freedom of Information Act (FOIA). Numerous organizations filed FOIA requests seeking at least a partial release of photographs, videos, and/or DNA test results, including The Associated Press, Reuters, CBS News, Judicial Watch, Politico, Fox News, Citizens United, and NPR. At the time of filing their FOIA request, The Associated Press said:

This information is important for the historical record. That's our view.

— Michael Oreskes, Senior Managing Editor, The Associated Press

On April 26, 2012, a US federal judge decided in the case Judicial Watch v. U.S. Department of Defense, et al that the DoD did not need to release any evidence to the public.

On 20 May 2015, the Office of the Director of National Intelligence (ODNI) released a sizeable number of documents recovered from the compound in Abbottabad where bin Laden was hiding. On 1 March 2016, the ODNI released a second tranche of material gleaned from the Abbottabad raid. On January 19, 2017, the ODNI released the final tranche of documents. ODNI said of the releases "[these releases] which followed a rigorous interagency review, align with the President’s call for increased transparency–consistent with national security prerogatives–and the 2014 Intelligence Authorization Act, which required the ODNI to conduct a review of the documents for release." The documents can be accessed publicly on the ODNI website.

On November 1, 2017, the Central Intelligence Agency (CIA) released nearly 470,000 files that included draft versions of items previously reviewed as well as other correspondence and materials outside the scope of previous declassification reviews. These files are available online as part of the CIA library. One of those files was bin Laden's diary.

== Burial at sea ==
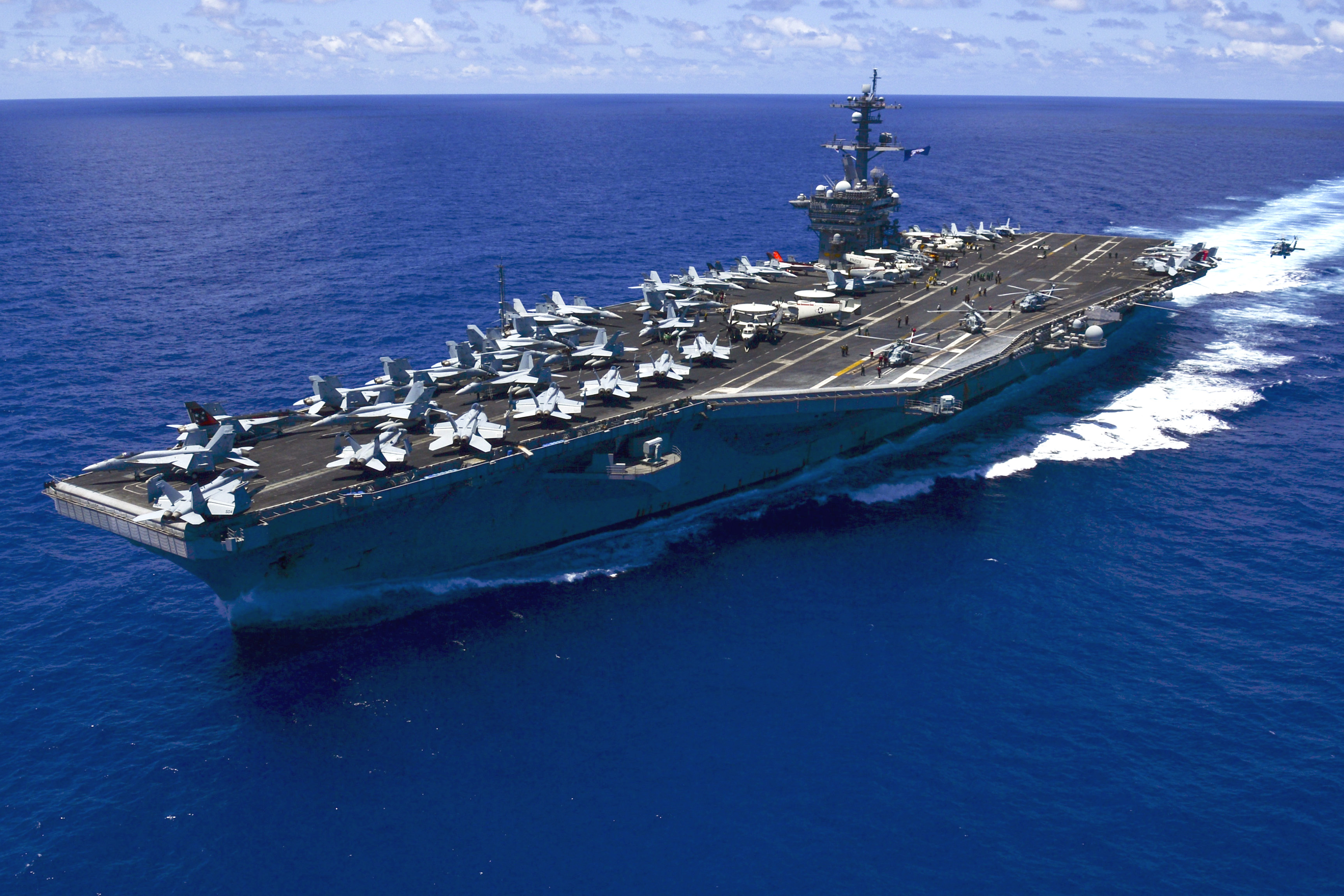
USS Carl Vinson, which carried bin Laden's body to sea

Doubts about bin Laden's death were fueled by the U.S. military's disposal of his body at sea, though U.S. officials maintained that the burial was necessary because arrangements could not be made with any country to bury bin Laden within 24 hours, as dictated by Muslim practice. The Muslim practice has not always been followed by the U.S. For example, the bodies of Uday Hussein and Qusay Hussein, sons of Saddam Hussein, were held for eleven days before release for burial. In that instance, several Iraqi cities refused to receive them.

The decision to bury bin Laden at sea was questioned by terrorists, Islamic clerics, and by some 9/11 survivors and the relatives of the victims. Professor Peter Romaniuk of John Jay College described the burial at sea as a way to forestall further questions. He stated: "Obviously they're going to be under pressure to show a body or produce further evidence, but this was a way of taking that issue off the table." A stated advantage of a burial at sea is that the site is not readily identified or accessed, thus preventing it from becoming a focus of attention or "terrorist shrine".

== Theories ==
=== In Pakistan ===
Senior Pakistani officials disseminated the theory that no firefight ever took place, and that whomever the U.S. forces captured, they executed him outside the compound, and took his body away on a helicopter.

Hamid Gul, the former head of Pakistan's Inter-Services Intelligence (ISI), stated in an interview with CNN that he believed bin Laden had died many years ago, and that the official death story given out by the American media was a hoax. Furthermore, he thinks the American government knew about bin Laden's death for years, "They must have known that he had died some years ago so they were waiting. They were keeping this story on the ice and they were looking for an appropriate moment and it couldn't be a better moment because President Obama had to fight off his first salvo in his next year's election as he runs for the presidential and for the White House and I think it is a very appropriate time to come out, bring this out of the closet."

Yet another scenario was reported in an article in the Urdu newspaper Ausaf, which quoted military sources as saying, "Bin Laden has been killed somewhere else. But since the US intends to extend the Afghan war into Pakistan, and accuse Pakistan, and obtain a permit for its military's entry into the country, it has devised the [assassination] scenario."

Bashir Qureshi, who lives close to the compound where bin Laden was shot and whose windows were blown out in the raid, was dismissive. "Nobody believes it. We've never seen any Arabs around here, he was not here."

=== In Iran ===
A number of Iranians said they believed that bin Laden was working with the U.S. during the entire war on terror. Ismail Kosari, an Iranian MP, said that bin Laden "was just a puppet controlled by the Zionist regime in order to present a violent image of Islam after the September 11 attacks", and that his death "reflects the passing of a temporary US pawn, and symbolizes the end of one era and the beginning of another in American policy in the region". Another MP, Javad Jahangirzadeh, said that it was the U.S. that had carried out the terrorist attacks, and bin Laden was the main source of help. He stated, "The West has been very pleased with bin Laden's operations in recent years. Now the West was forced to kill him in order to prevent a possible leak of information he had, information more precious than gold."

Iranian President Mahmoud Ahmadinejad said "I have exact information that bin Laden was held by the American military for sometime... until the day they killed him he was a prisoner held by them," in a live interview on Iranian state television.

=== Seymour Hersh ===
On May 21, 2015, Pulitzer prize winning journalist Seymour Hersh published a 10,000 word report (later a book - The Killing of Osama bin Laden) challenging most aspects of the official account of Osama's death. Among other things, the report claims that the Pakistani Inter-Services Intelligence (ISI) had kept bin Laden under house arrest at Abbottabad since 2006, and that when the US discovered this, Pakistani Army chief Pervez Kayani and ISI director Ahmad Shuja Pasha helped the U.S. in killing, not capturing bin Laden. Hersh's U.S. and Pakistani intelligence sources stated that the U.S. had learned of bin Laden's location through a "walk-in", a former ISI officer who came to the US embassy in Islamabad in 2010 seeking the $25 million reward, and not through tracking a courier. This claim had been previously reported by R.J. Hillhouse and was confirmed afterwards by NBC news. The White House denied Hersh's report.

Pakistani journalist Ahmed Rashid in the New York Review of Books finds the cooperation between the CIA and ISI that Hersh describes "inconceivable", in part because 2011 was "the worst year in US-Pakistan relations since the late 1980s" and "hatred and mistrust" between the CIA and ISI was "acute"—something Hersh does not mention in his article/book. Among the incidents that occurred in Pakistan in the months before the killing of bin Laden were the killing of two Pakistanis by Raymond Davis, a CIA contractor, numerous death threats against the Islamabad CIA station chief after his name was leaked (purportedly by the ISI), the cessation of the issuing of visas for US officials, following which the entire US consulate in Lahore was shut down and moved to Islamabad over concerns about security; increased US anger over the refusal of Pakistan to exert pressure on the Taliban and Haqqani group; the death of 40 Pakistanis including many civilians and later 24 Pakistani soldiers from US drone strikes, the cut off of US supplies to Afghanistan by Pakistan. Further adding to the implausibility of Hersh's theory, according to Rashid, is the unlikeliness that either the US would have "calmly accepted" Pakistan's hiding and protecting bin Laden, or that the dozens of Pakistani military, police, fire and bureaucrats—whose silence/complicity would have been required for a successful conspiracy—would have cooperated with the American incursion. While there was little or no disapproval by the Pakistan public over bin Laden's long residency in Pakistan, the US attack on the compound of bin Laden was so unpopular that just the failure of the military to detect and go after the US helicopters ignited outrage among the media, the public and the civilian government.

Andrew Anthony, in his review of the book for The Guardian, acknowledged the US government's "long and inglorious history of attempting to bury the facts" but found Hersh's theories "forceful but unconvincing". Zach Dorfman, in the Los Angeles Times, called Hersh's judgment about the veracity of his sources "mixed, at best" while acknowledging "the danger of a regime of excessive secrecy in international affairs [...] of which Hersh is rightly and acutely aware". (Rashid, Anthony, and Dorfman were also skeptical of another theory expounded in Hersh's book—that the Ghouta chemical attack that killed hundreds of Syrian civilians were instigated not by the Syrian government, but by rebels aided by Turkey working as agents provocateurs, blaming the Syrian government in hopes of forcing the Obama administration to enter the war against the government.)

=== Internet ===
Facebook groups formed discussing a rumor, in what has been dubbed the "death hoax". Some blogs theorised that the raid and killing were faked, in a conspiracy to attempt to deflect questions about President Obama's citizenship, or to boost Obama's approval ratings and guarantee his popularity during the 2012 U.S. presidential election.

=== Others ===
In 2002, the FBI's top counter-terrorism official, Dale Watson, said, "I personally think he [Osama bin Laden] is probably not with us anymore." Anti-war activist Cindy Sheehan stated "If you believe the newest death of OBL, you're stupid". Sheehan further stated on her Facebook page, "The only proof of [bin Laden] being dead again that we were offered was Obama telling us that there was a DNA match between the man killed by the Navy SEALs and OBL. Even if it is possible to get DNA done so quickly, and the regime did have bin Laden DNA lying around a lab somewhere – where is the empirical proof?"

On Russia Today, radio host Alex Jones claimed that bin Laden had been dead for nearly ten years, and that his body had been kept in liquid nitrogen so that it can be used as a propaganda tool at a future politically expedient time. He claimed that in 2002 an anonymous White House source had told him that bin Laden "is frozen, literally frozen and that he would be rolled out in the future at some date". In a separate interview in 2002, Steve Pieczenik told Jones that bin Laden had been dead for months. Jones also pointed to similar comments made by former Secretary of State Madeleine Albright in 2003, "Yes we have been told by intelligence that they've got him, Bush may roll him out but because they exposed that at the election they didn't do it". Jones further voiced doubts about the official story of bin Laden's death on his radio show telling his listeners, "My friends, this is a complete and total hoax."

Andrew Napolitano, the host of the Fox Business program Freedom Watch, said bin Laden's death could not be verified and insinuated that Obama was using the death of bin Laden to save his "lousy presidency." An article in Mediaite criticized Napolitano's remarks, opining that "such conspiracy talk is ultimately beneath Napolitano and his often enlightened discussions."

Canadian deputy Leader of the Opposition and MP, Thomas Mulcair, stated in an interview with CBC Television that "I don't think from what I've heard that those pictures [of bin Laden's body] exist". His remarks were picked up by dozens of U.S. media outlets, and criticized by various Canadian politicians.

An official statement from the Taliban stated that the lack of photos or video footage is suspicious, as their own sources close to bin Laden had not confirmed or denied his death, and that "when the Americans killed Mullah Dadullah (Taliban's chief military commander) they publicly showed the footage".

In October 2020, then-U.S. President Donald Trump retweeted an article which claimed that the Osama that was killed in the raid wasn't him but was actually a body double.

Several news agencies and intelligence agencies reported his death as being before 9/11 or shortly after from renal failure. Western intelligence reports stated bin Laden was seriously ill with kidney and liver disease. Bin Laden, who suffered from renal deficiency, had been periodically undergoing dialysis in a Peshawar military hospital with the knowledge and approval of the Inter-Services Intelligence, (ISI) if not of Gen. Pervez Musharraf himself. Bin Laden is alleged to have arrived in Dubai on July 4 from Quetta in Pakistan with his own personal doctor, nurse and four bodyguards, to be treated in the urology department. While there, he was allegedly visited by several members of his family and Saudi personalities, and the CIA. In December 2001 the New York Times reported that he was likely dead.

In late 2001 or early 2002, bin Laden's "Death Video" was released that month, after reports of bin Laden's funeral, a new video appeared, depicting a gaunt, sickly Osama bin Laden. The London Telegraph reported, "The recording was dismissed by the Bush administration yesterday as sick propaganda, possibly designed to mask the fact the al-Qa'eda leader was already dead."

In July 2002, CNN reported that bin Laden's close bodyguards were captured in February 2002, but not bin Laden. The article also quoted high-level officials: "Some high-level U.S. officials are already convinced by such evidence that bin Laden, who has not been seen or heard from in months, is dead." In October 2002, intelligence officials alleged bin Laden was dead, and his will was released. Also in October 2002, the Washington D.C.-based news service The World Tribune, citing Israeli intelligence sources, reported that the United States and Israel have concluded that bin Laden died in Afghanistan in December 2001. They noted that additional bin Laden messages are "probably fabrications," and that bin Laden's heir had been chosen. Intelligence officials allegedly obtained Osama bin Laden's will, which was dated December 14, 2001, though they were unable to ascertain its validity. CNN also reported that there has been no evidence of Bin Laden since December 2001.

In 2004, the LA Times quotes Donald Rumsfeld as admitting: "We've not seen him [bin Laden] on a video since 2001." In 2006, the New York Times reported the CIA had officially closed down the unit focused on capturing bin Laden the previous year, with the unit being folded into the broader Counterterrorist Center. In 2006, U.S. and Pakistani officials said they have not received any information about bin Laden in years: "no tips from informants, no snippets from electronic intercepts, no points on any satellite image." The article rehashes the December 2001 video of bin Laden as the most recent evidence (other than a second-hand claim from 2003) of bin Laden's existence.

== Related conspiracy theories ==
Numerous other conspiracy theories relating to bin Laden's death that were discussed include:

- That bin Laden had been killed a number of years prior in the Tora Bora mountains, but that this information had been kept secret to encourage continued support for the war on terror.
- That bin Laden died much earlier than reported, and the announcement of bin Laden's death was delayed, so as not to clash with the festivities surrounding the wedding of Prince William and Catherine Middleton.
- That the announcement of bin Laden's death was timed to conflict with and take Donald Trump's Celebrity Apprentice off the air, to punish Trump for publicly questioning the authenticity of Barack Obama's birth certificate.

== See also ==
- Al Qaeda
- List of conspiracy theories
