= Military Families Speak Out =

American anti-Iraq war group

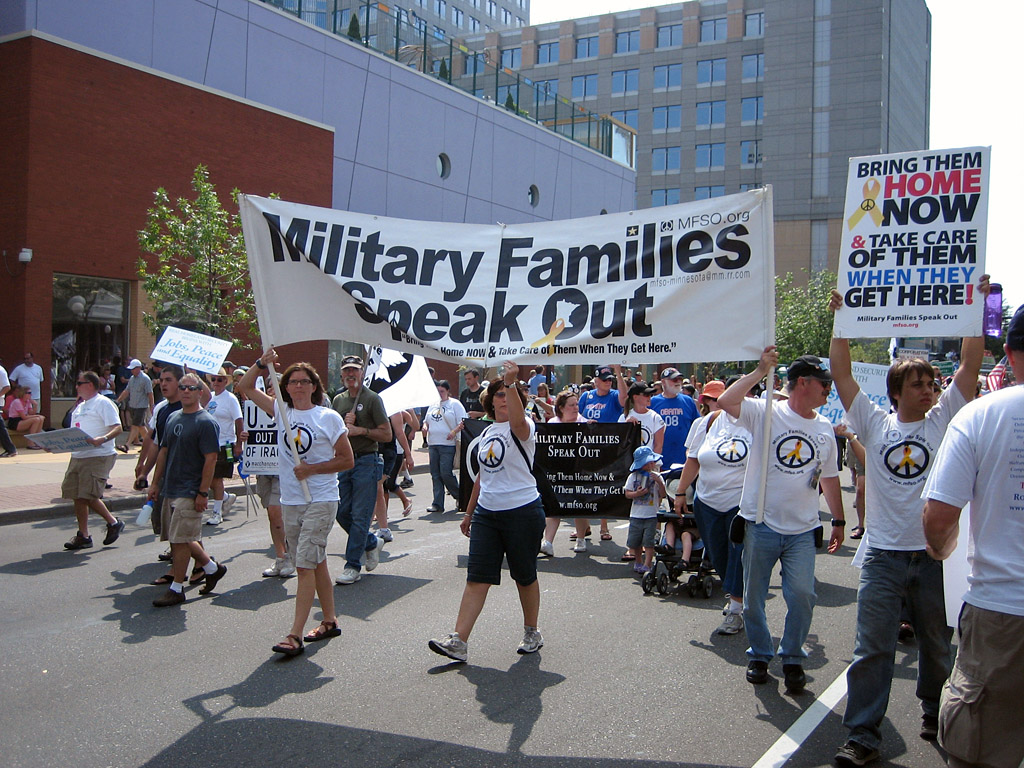
An MFSO march at the 2008 Republican National Convention

Military Families Speak Out (MFSO) is an American anti-Iraq war group. It was founded by two military families in November 2002 to oppose the planned invasion of Iraq.

MFSO's first national press conference was held to launch the "Bring Them Home Now" campaign in August 2003 at the National Press Club in Washington, D.C. It was organized by the Mintwood Media Collective and was televised on C-SPAN. Following the event, over 100 military families joined the organization within a week. That same month, MFSO members marched together for the first time with Veterans For Peace at a national demonstration opposing a U.S. invasion of Iraq. In February, 2003, 15 members of MFSO filed a lawsuit against President Bush and then-Secretary of Defense Donald Rumsfeld seeking to prevent a U.S. invasion of Iraq in the absence of a Congressional declaration of war. The lawsuit went two rounds in the 1st Circuit Court of Appeals, and ultimately failed on March 18, 2003. The invasion began on March 19, 2003. Within two weeks of the beginning of the war in Iraq, the membership of MFSO doubled, with 400 member families at the end of March, 2003.

The first MFSO chapters began in 2004. MFSO chapters have organized and built the voice of military families opposing the war in Iraq locally and regionally, with speaking programs, vigils, demonstrations, press conferences, meetings with elected officials, and many different kinds of creative actions. Chapters have allowed the organisation to reach out to new families around the country, get the voices of military families opposing the war into the media, work with local coalitions seeking to end the war in Iraq and to help mobilise citizens and elected officials to oppose the war in Iraq and take action to end it.

As of February 2007, MFSO included over 3,200 military families speaking out to end the war in Iraq, withdraw troops, take care of them when they return, and end the policies that allowed the war to happen. They have members in every state in the U.S., in Puerto Rico, American Samoa and on US military bases in several other countries. Over 130 of these families have suffered the ultimate tragedy – their loved ones have died as a result of the war in Iraq. Many other MFSO member families have seen loved ones wounded in Iraq – physically, psychologically or both. Many MFSO member families currently have loved ones serving in Iraq – some for third, fourth or fifth deployments; and for most of the rest, their loved ones are eligible for deployment or redeployment to Iraq.

== See also ==
- List of anti-war organizations
- List of peace activists
