= Crawford, Texas =

- Town
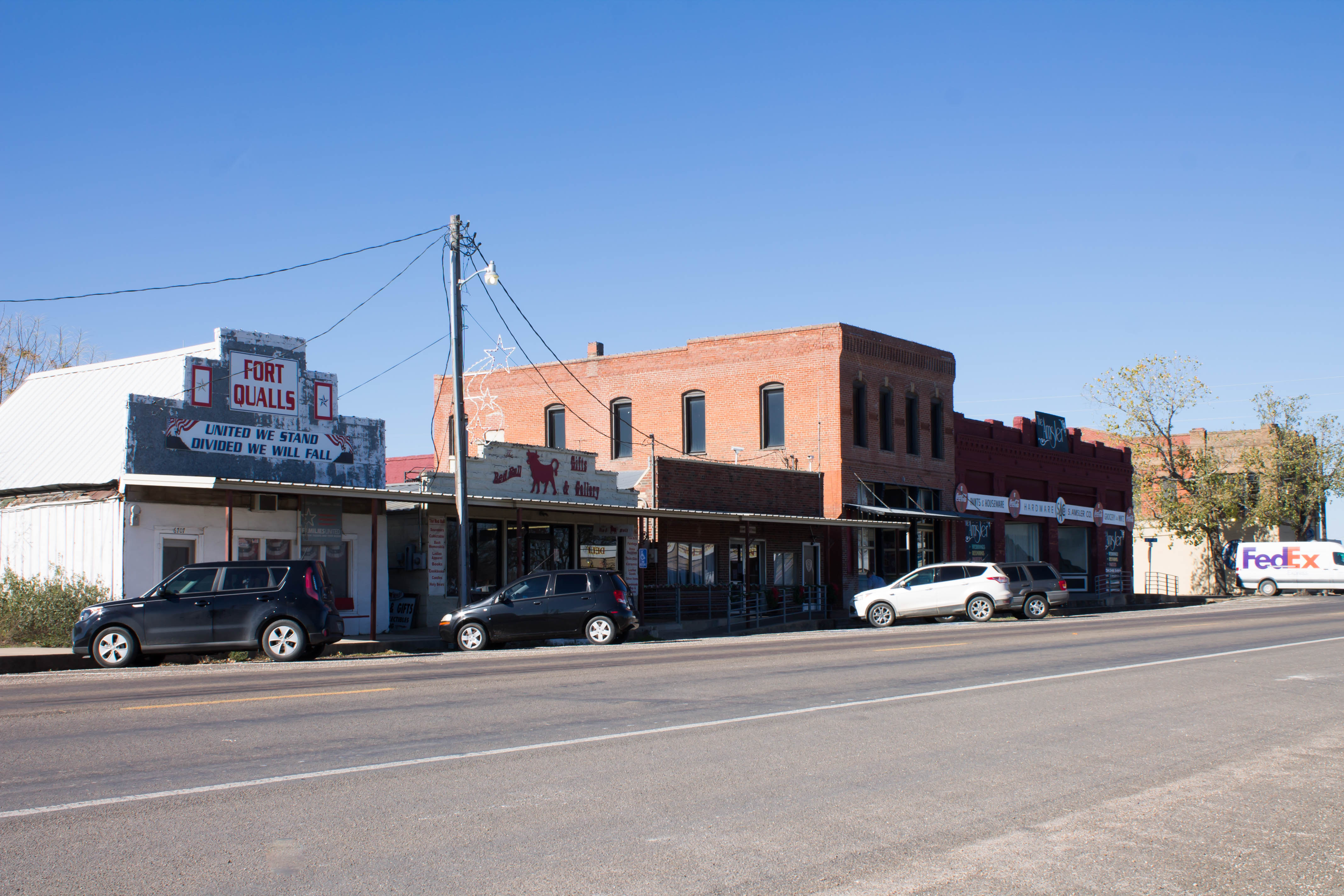
- Downtown Crawford

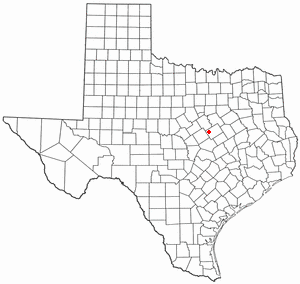
- Location of Crawford, Texas

- U.S. Census Map
- Coordinates: 31°32′16″N 97°26′48″W
- Country: United States
- State: Texas
- County: McLennan
- Incorporated: August 12, 1897

Area
  - Total: 1.46 sq mi (3.78 km^{2})
  - Land: 1.46 sq mi (3.78 km^{2})
  - Water: 0 sq mi (0.00 km^{2})
- Elevation: 699 ft (213 m)

Population (2020)
  - Total: 887
  - Density: 566.3/sq mi (218.65/km^{2})
- Time zone: UTC-6 (Central (CST))
  - Summer (DST): UTC-5 (CDT)
- ZIP code: 76638
- Area code: 254
- FIPS code: 48-17564
- GNIS feature ID: 2412383
- Website: https://crawfordtx.gov/

Crawford is a town located in western McLennan County, Texas, United States. Crawford is part of the Waco Metropolitan Statistical Area. As of the 2020 census, the town had a total population of 887.

The town was incorporated on August 12, 1897.

It is best known as the home of the 43rd president of the United States, George W. Bush. He currently resides part-time at the Prairie Chapel Ranch, which is located just outside Crawford, Texas.

== Demographics ==
Historical population
| Census | Pop. | Note | %± |
|---|---|---|---|
| 1900 | 443 | | — |
| 1910 | 516 | | 16.5% |
| 1920 | 573 | | 11.0% |
| 1930 | 491 | | −14.3% |
| 1940 | 471 | | −4.1% |
| 1950 | 423 | | −10.2% |
| 1960 | 480 | | 13.5% |
| 1970 | 477 | | −0.6% |
| 1980 | 610 | | 27.9% |
| 1990 | 631 | | 3.4% |
| 2000 | 705 | | 11.7% |
| 2010 | 717 | | 1.7% |
| 2020 | 887 | | 23.7% |
U.S. Decennial Census

Crawford racial composition as of 2020 (NH = Non-Hispanic) (Note: Note: the US Census treats Hispanic/Latino as an ethnic category. This table excludes Latinos from the racial categories and assigns them to a separate category. Hispanics/Latinos can be of any race.)
| Race | Number | Percentage |
|---|---|---|
| White (NH) | 752 | 84.78% |
| Black or African American (NH) | 18 | 2.03% |
| Native American or Alaska Native (NH) | 1 | 0.11% |
| Mixed/Multi-Racial (NH) | 46 | 5.19% |
| Hispanic or Latino | 70 | 7.89% |
| Total | 887 | |

As of the 2020 United States census, there were 887 people, 337 households, and 270 families residing in the town.

At the 2000 census there were 705 people in the town, organized into 260 households and 192 families. The population density was 763.1 inhabitants per square mile (294.6/km^{2}). There were 277 housing units at an average density of 299.8 per square mile (115.8/km^{2}). The racial makeup of the town was 88.37% White, 4.40% African American, 0.14% Native American, 0.00% Asian, 0.00% Pacific Islander, 5.96% from other races, and 1.13% from two or more races. 11.49% of the population were Hispanic or Latino of any race. There were 260 households, 41.2% had children under the age of 18 living with them, 59.6% were married couples living together, 10.4% had a female householder with no husband present, and 25.8% were non-families. 23.8% of households were made up of individuals, and 13.1% had someone living alone who was 65 or older. The average household size was 2.71 and the average family size was 3.23.

The age distribution was 30.8% under the age of 18, 7.7% from 18 to 24, 27.0% from 25 to 44, 21.3% from 45 to 64, and 13.3% who were 65 or older. The median age was 35 years. For every 100 females, there were 93.2 males. For every 100 females age 18 and over, there were 88.4 males.

The median household income was $38,015 and the median family income was $39,732. Males had a median income of $31,765 versus $19,653 for females. The per capita income for the town was $15,421. 6.2% of the population and 6.4% of families were below the poverty line. Out of the total population, 2.9% of those under the age of 18 and 24.7% of those 65 and older were living below the poverty line.

== Education ==
Crawford is served by the Crawford Independent School District.

== Notable people ==
=== George W. Bush ===
The Waco suburb is best known for President George W. Bush's Prairie Chapel Ranch, located just outside the town. Crawford was the site of many anti-Iraq War demonstrations including Camp Casey, when Cindy Sheehan purchased five acres (2 ha) just outside Crawford. Crawford is the subject of a 2008 documentary film, also called Crawford, about the change brought to the town by Bush's arrival.

== Gallery ==
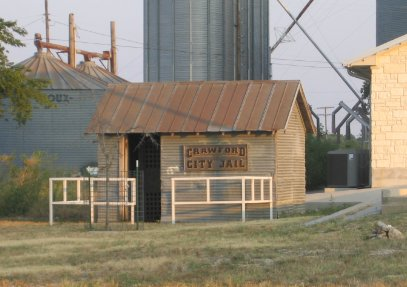
The old city jail in Crawford.

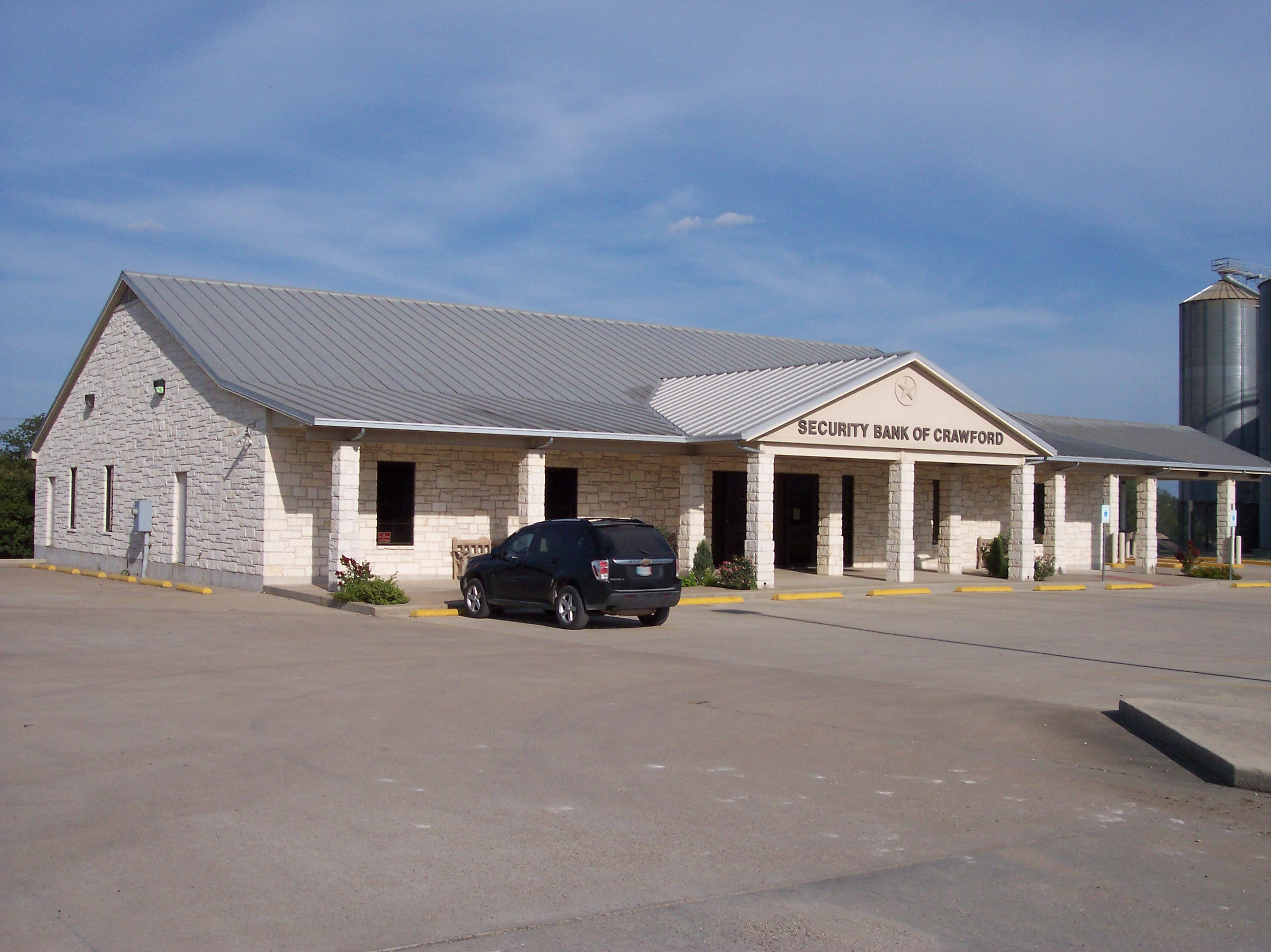
Security Bank of Crawford on Main Street.

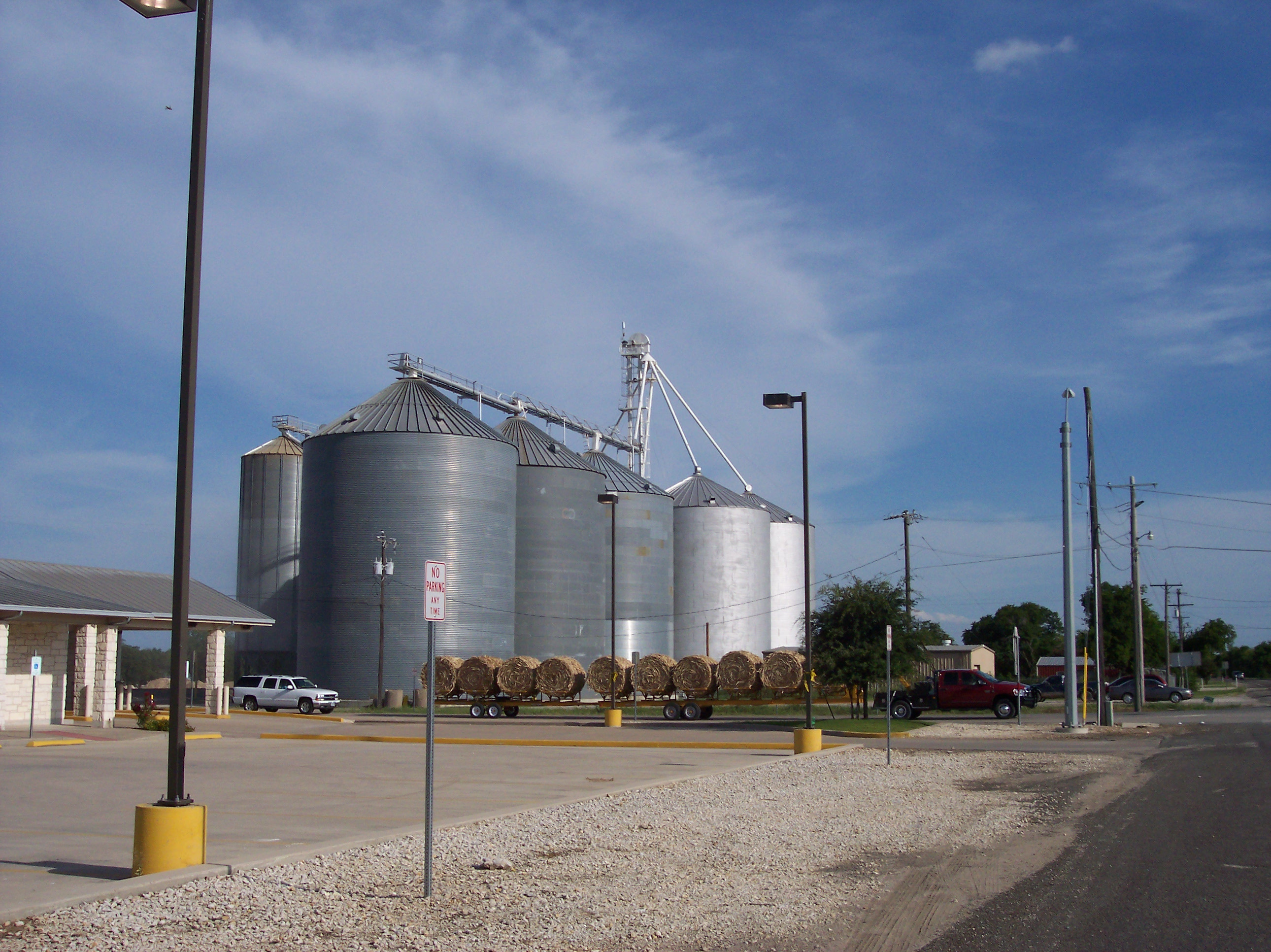
Grain silos along Main Street in Crawford, Texas.

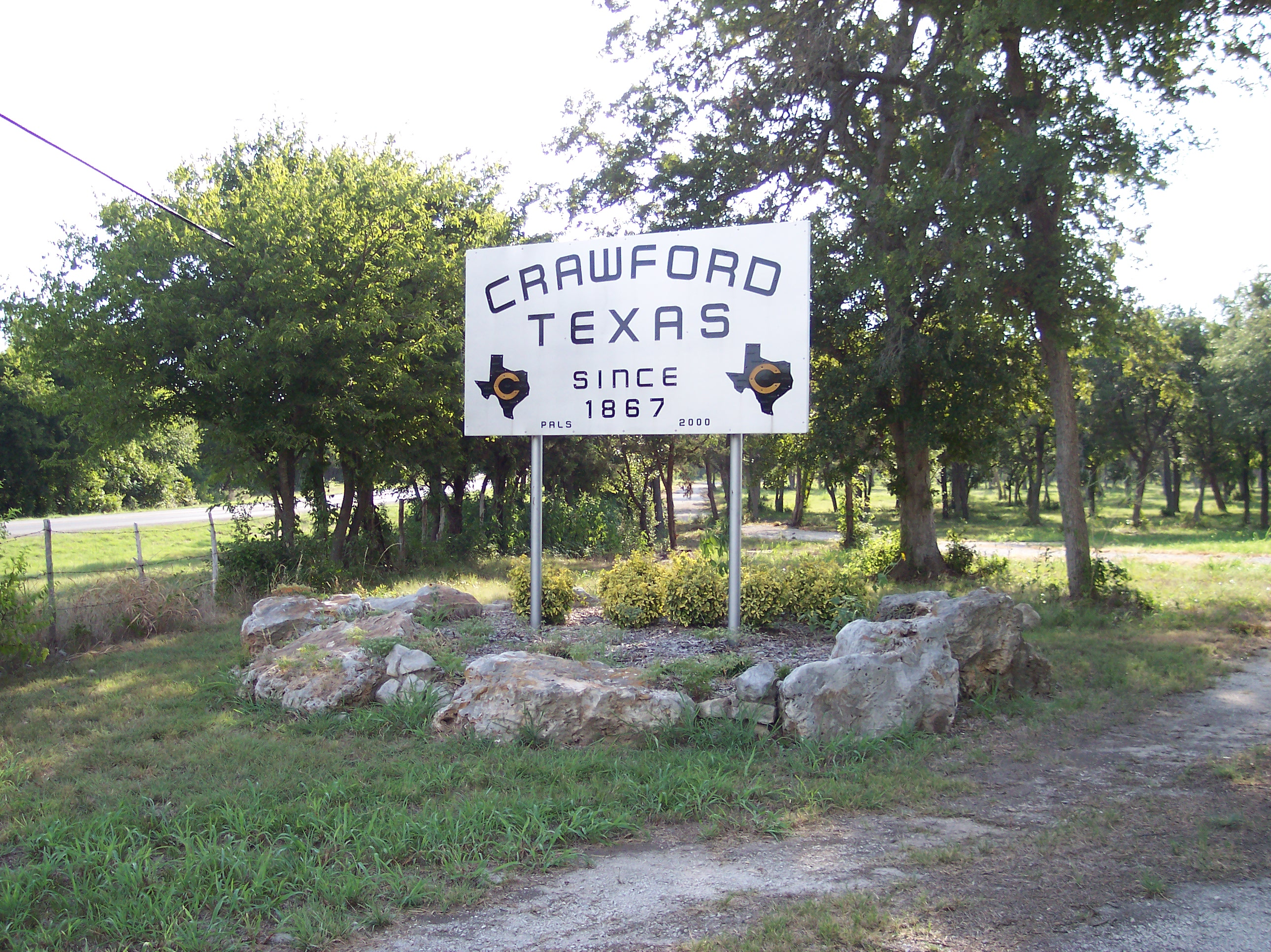
Welcome sign into Crawford on FM 185.

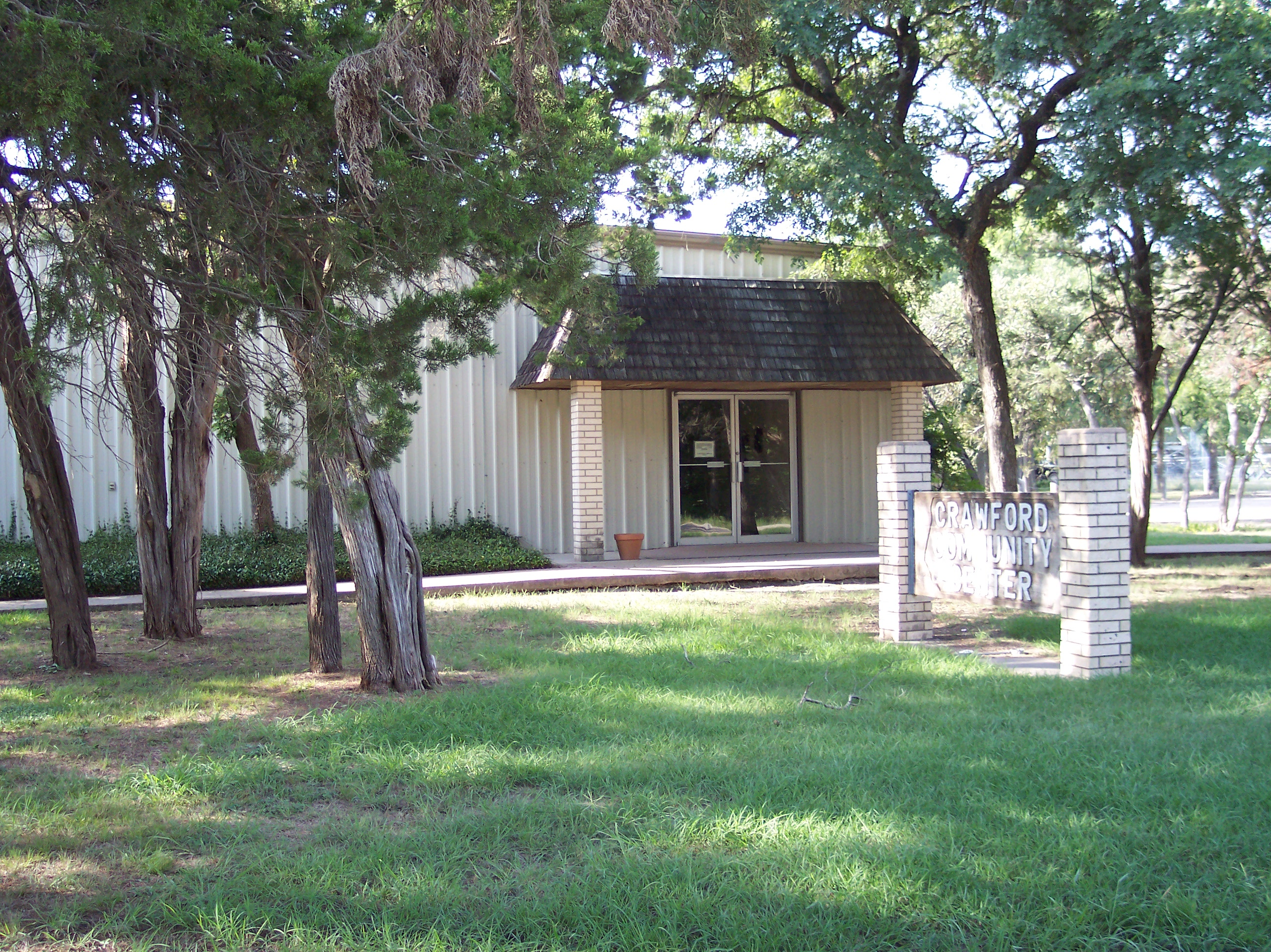
Many city, church, and school events are held at the Crawford Community Center.

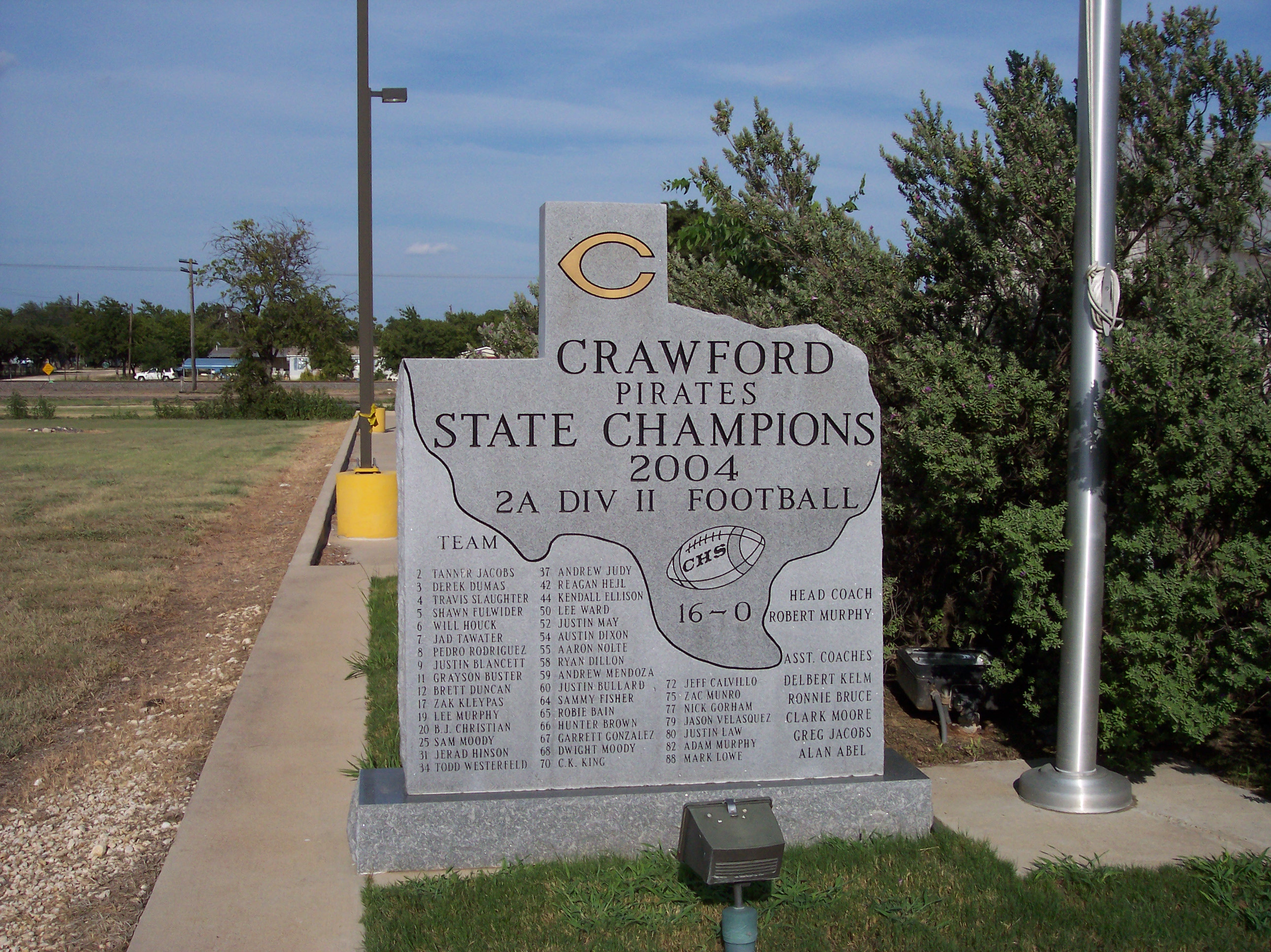
Tribute to the 2004 Football State Champions Crawford Pirates and their undefeated season, going 16–0.

== See also ==
- Crawford (name)
