= Flag of the United States =

- Other names: The American flag, The Stars and Stripes, The Red, White and Blue, Old Glory, The Star-Spangled Banner, The 50 Stars and 13 Bars, United States (U.S.) flag
- Use: National flag and ensign
- Proportion: 10:19
- Adopted: December 3, 1775; 250 years ago (Continental Union Flag); June 14, 1777; 249 years ago (13-star version); July 4, 1960; 66 years ago (current 50-star version)
- Design: Thirteen horizontal stripes alternating red and white; in the canton, one white star for each state (50 stars as of 1960) arranged in horizontal rows (of alternating numbers of six and five stars per row as of 1960) on a blue field
- Union Jack
- Use: Naval jack
- Proportion: 71:100
- Adopted: 1777 (initial use of underlying design template); July 4, 1960 (current design); July 4, 2019 (readopted)
- Design: 50 white five-pointed stars defacing a blue field in 9 rows, alternating between 6 and 5 stars.

The national flag of the United States of America, often referred to as the American flag or the U.S. flag, consists of thirteen horizontal stripes, alternating red and white starting with red, with a blue rectangle in the canton bearing fifty small, white, five-pointed stars arranged in nine offset horizontal rows, where rows of six stars alternate with rows of five stars. The 50 stars on the flag form a constellation, representing the 50 U.S. states united, while the 13 stripes represent the thirteen British colonies that won independence in the American Revolutionary War.

The flag was created as an item of military equipment to identify U.S. ships and forts. It evolved gradually during early American history, and was not designed by any one person. The flag exploded in popularity in 1861 as a symbol of opposition to the Confederate attack on Fort Sumter. It came to symbolize the Union in the American Civil War; Union victory solidified its status as a national flag. Because of the country's emergence as a superpower in the 20th century, the flag is now among the most widely recognized symbols in the world.

Well-known nicknames for the flag include "the Stars and Stripes", "Old Glory", "the Star-Spangled Banner", and "the Red, White and Blue". The Pledge of Allegiance and the holiday Flag Day are dedicated to it. The number of stars on the flag is increased as new states join the United States. The last adjustment was made in 1960, following the admission of Hawaii.

== History ==
The current design of the U.S. flag is its 27th; the design of the flag has been modified officially 26 times since 1777. The 48-star flag was in effect for 47 years until the 49-star version became official on July 4, 1959. The 50-star flag was ordered by then president Eisenhower on August 21, 1959, and was adopted in July 1960. It is the longest-used version of the U.S. flag and has been in use for over 66 years.

=== First flag ===
The Continental Union Flag, also known as the first American flag, was used from 1775 to 1777

The first official flag resembling the "Stars and Stripes" was the Continental Navy ensign (often referred to as the Continental Union Flag, Continental Colours, the first American flag, Cambridge Flag, and Grand Union Flag) was used from 1775 to 1777. It consisted of 13 red-and-white stripes, with the British Union Jack in the canton. It first appeared on December 3, 1775, when Continental Navy Lieutenant John Paul Jones flew it aboard Captain Esek Hopkins' flagship Alfred on the Delaware River.

Prospect Hill was the location of George Washington's command post during the Siege of Boston during the American Revolution. On New Year's Day in 1776, Washington conducted a flag-raising ceremony to raise the morale of the men of the Continental Army. The standard account features the Continental Union Flag flying, although in 2006, Peter Ansoff advanced a theory that it was actually a British Union Flag instead. Others, such as Byron DeLear, have argued in favor of the traditional version of events. The Continental Union Flag remained the national flag until June 14, 1777. At the time of the Declaration of Independence in July 1776, there were no flags with any stars on them; the Continental Congress did not adopt flags with "stars, white in a blue field" for another year. It has historically been referred to as the first flag of the United States.

Colloquially referred to as the Cambridge Flag and Grand Union Flag; the terms domain did not come into use until the 19th century. Although it has been claimed the more recent moniker, Grand Union Flag, was first applied to the Continental Union Flag by G. Henry Preble in his Reconstruction era book Our Flag; the first substantiated use of the name came from Philadelphia resident T. Westcott in 1852 when replying to an inquiry made in Notes and Queries, a London periodical, as to the origin of the U.S. flag.

The flag of the East India Company, introduced in 1707 and flown at sea in the Indian Ocean

The flag very closely resembles the East India Company flag of the era. Sir Charles Fawcett argued in 1937 that the company flag inspired the design of the U.S. flag. Both flags could easily have been constructed by adding white stripes to a Red Ensign, one of the three maritime flags used throughout the British Empire at the time. However, the East India Company flag could have from nine to 13 stripes and was not allowed to be flown outside the Indian Ocean.

Benjamin Franklin once gave a speech endorsing the adoption of the East India Company flag by the United Colonies. He said to George Washington, "While the field of your flag must be new in the details of its design, it need not be entirely new in its elements. There is already in use a flag, I refer to the flag of the East India Company." This was a way of symbolizing American loyalty to the Crown as well as the colonies' aspirations to be self-governing, as was the East India Company.

The theory that the Continental Union Flag was a direct descendant of the East India Company flag has been criticized as lacking written evidence; on the other hand, the resemblance to the company flag is obvious, and some of the Founding Fathers of the United States were aware of the East India Company's activities and of their free administration of India under Company rule.

=== Flag Resolution of 1777 ===
On June 14, 1777, the Continental Congress passed the Flag Resolution which stated: "Resolved, That the flag of the thirteen United States be thirteen stripes, alternate red and white; that the union be thirteen stars, white in a blue field, representing a new constellation." Flag Day is now observed on June 14 of each year. While scholars still argue about this, tradition holds that the new flag was first hoisted in June 1777 by the Continental Army at the Middlebrook encampment.

Both the stripes (barry) and the stars (mullets) have precedents in classical heraldry. Mullets were comparatively rare in early modern heraldry. However, an example of mullets representing territorial divisions predating the U.S. flag is the Valais 1618 coat of arms, where seven mullets stood for seven districts.

Another widely repeated theory is that the design was inspired by the coat of arms of George Washington's family, which includes three red stars over two horizontal red bars on a white field. Despite the similar visual elements, there is "little evidence" or "no evidence whatsoever" to support the claimed connection with the flag design. The Digital Encyclopedia of George Washington, published by the Fred W. Smith National Library for the Study of George Washington at Mount Vernon, calls it an "enduring myth" backed by "no discernible evidence". The story seems to have originated with the 1876 play Washington: A Drama in Five Acts, by the English poet Martin Farquhar Tupper, and was further popularized through repetition in the children's magazine St. Nicholas.

The first official U.S. flag flown during battle was on August 3, 1777, at Fort Schuyler (Fort Stanwix) during the Siege of Fort Stanwix. Massachusetts reinforcements brought news of the adoption by Congress of the official flag to Fort Schuyler. Soldiers cut up their shirts to make the white stripes; scarlet material to form the red was secured from red flannel petticoats of officers' wives, while material for the blue union was secured from Capt. Abraham Swartwout's blue cloth coat. A voucher is extant that Congress paid Capt. Swartwout of Dutchess County for his coat for the flag.

The 1777 resolution was probably meant to define a naval ensign. In the late 18th century, the notion of a national flag did not yet exist or was only nascent. The flag resolution appears between other resolutions from the Marine Committee. On May 10, 1779, Secretary of the Board of War Richard Peters expressed concern that "it is not yet settled what is the Standard of the United States." However, the term "Standard" referred to a national standard for the Army of the United States. Each regiment was to carry the national standard in addition to its regimental standard. The national standard was not a reference to the national or naval flag.

Two examples of flags with unusual stars and stripes that were created after the 1777 resolution. Top: The Bennington flag. Bottom: The Serapis flag.

The Flag Resolution did not specify any particular arrangement, number of points, nor orientation for the stars and the arrangement or whether the flag had to have seven red stripes and six white ones or vice versa. The appearance was up to the maker of the flag. Some flag makers arranged the stars into one big star, in a circle or in rows and some replaced a state's star with its initial. One arrangement features 13 five-pointed stars arranged in a circle, with the stars arranged pointing outwards from the circle (as opposed to up), the Betsy Ross flag. Experts have dated the earliest known example of this flag to be 1792 in a painting by John Trumbull.

Despite the 1777 resolution, the early years of American independence featured many different, hand-crafted flags. As late as 1779, Captain John Manley believed that the United States "had no national colors" so each ship flew whatever flag pleased the captain.

Some of the early flags included blue stripes as well as red and white. Benjamin Franklin and John Adams, in an October 3, 1778, letter to Ferdinand I of the Two Sicilies, described the American flag as consisting of "13 stripes, alternately red, white, and blue, a small square in the upper angle, next to the flagstaff, is a blue field, with 13 white stars, denoting a new Constellation." John Paul Jones used a variety of 13-star flags on his U.S. Navy ships including the well-documented 1779 flags of the Serapis and the Alliance. The Serapis flag had three rows of eight-pointed stars with red, white, and blue stripes. However, the flag for the Alliance had five rows of eight-pointed stars with 13 red and white stripes, and the white stripes were on the outer edges. Both flags were documented by the Dutch government in October 1779, making them two of the earliest known flags of 13 stars.

=== Designer of the first stars and stripes ===
Francis Hopkinson's flag for the U.S., an interpretation, with 13 six-pointed stars arranged in five rows

Hopkinson Flag for the U.S. Navy, an interpretation

Francis Hopkinson of New Jersey, a naval flag designer and a signer of the Declaration of Independence, designed a flag in 1777 while he was the chairman of the Continental Navy Board's Middle Department, sometime between his appointment to that position in November 1776 and the time that the flag resolution was adopted in June 1777. The Navy Board was under the Continental Marine Committee. Not only did Hopkinson claim that he designed the U.S. flag, but he also claimed that he designed a flag for the U.S. Navy. Hopkinson was the only person to have made such a claim during his own life when he sent a letter and several bills to Congress for his work. These claims are documented in the Journals of the Continental Congress and George Hasting's biography of Hopkinson. Hopkinson initially wrote a letter to Congress, via the Continental Board of Admiralty, on May 25, 1780. In this letter, he asked for a "Quarter Cask of the Public Wine" as payment for designing the U.S. flag, the seal for the Admiralty Board, the seal for the Treasury Board, Continental currency, the Great Seal of the United States, and other devices. However, in three subsequent bills to Congress, Hopkinson asked to be paid in cash, but he did not list his U.S. flag design. Instead, he asked to be paid for designing the "great Naval Flag of the United States" in the first bill; the "Naval Flag of the United States" in the second bill; and "the Naval Flag of the States" in the third, along with the other items. The flag references were generic terms for the naval ensign that Hopkinson had designed: a flag of seven red stripes and six white ones. The predominance of red stripes made the naval flag more visible against the sky on a ship at sea. By contrast, Hopkinson's flag for the United States had seven white stripes and six red ones – in reality, six red stripes laid on a white background. Hopkinson's sketches have not been found, but we can make these conclusions because Hopkinson incorporated different stripe arrangements in the Admiralty (naval) Seal that he designed in the Spring of 1780 and the Great Seal of the United States that he proposed at the same time. His Admiralty Seal had seven red stripes; whereas his second U.S. Seal proposal had seven white ones. Remnants of Hopkinson's U.S. flag of seven white stripes can be found in the Great Seal of the United States and the President's seal. The stripe arrangement would have been consistent with other flags of the period that had seven stripes below the canton, or blue area with stars. For example, two of the earliest known examples of Stars and Stripes flags were painted by a Dutch artist who witnessed the arrival of Navy Lieutenant John Paul Jones' squadron in Texel, The Netherlands, in 1779. The two flags have seven stripes below the canton.

When Hopkinson was chairman of the Navy Board, his position was like that of today's Secretary of the Navy. The payment was not made, most likely, because other people had contributed to designing the Great Seal of the United States, and because it was determined he already received a salary as a member of Congress. This contradicts the legend of the Betsy Ross flag, which suggests that she sewed the first Stars and Stripes flag at the request of the government in the Spring of 1776.

On May 10, 1779, a letter from the War Board to George Washington stated that there was still no design established for a national standard, on which to base regimental standards, but also referenced flag requirements given to the board by General von Steuben. On September 3, Richard Peters submitted to Washington "Drafts of a Standard" and asked for his "Ideas of the Plan of the Standard", adding that the War Board preferred a design they viewed as "a variant for the Marine Flag". Washington agreed that he preferred "the standard, with the Union and Emblems in the center." The drafts are lost to history but are likely to be similar to the first Jack of the United States.

13-star Betsy Ross variant

The origin of the stars and stripes design has been muddled by a story disseminated by the descendants of Betsy Ross. The apocryphal story credits Betsy Ross for sewing one of the first flags from a pencil sketch handed to her by George Washington. No such evidence exists either in George Washington's diaries or the Continental Congress's records. Indeed, nearly a century passed before Ross's grandson, William Canby, first publicly suggested the story in 1870. By her family's own admission, Ross ran an upholstery business, and she had never made a flag as of the supposed visit in June 1776. Furthermore, her grandson admitted that his own search through the Journals of Congress and other official records failed to find corroborating evidence for his grandmother's story.

George Henry Preble states in his 1882 text that no combined stars and stripes flag was in common use prior to June 1777, and that no one knows who designed the 1777 flag. Historian Laurel Thatcher Ulrich argues that there was no "first flag" worth arguing over. Researchers accept that the United States flag evolved, and did not have one design. Marla Miller writes, "The flag, like the Revolution it represents, was the work of many hands."

The family of Rebecca Young claimed that she sewed the first flag. Young's daughter was Mary Pickersgill, who made the Star-Spangled Banner Flag. She was assisted by Grace Wisher, a 13-year-old African American girl.

=== Later flag acts ===
15-star, 15-stripe Star-Spangled Banner Flag

This 48-star flag was in use from 1912 to 1959, the second longest-used U.S. flag. The current U.S. flag is the longest-used flag, having surpassed the 1912 version in 2007.

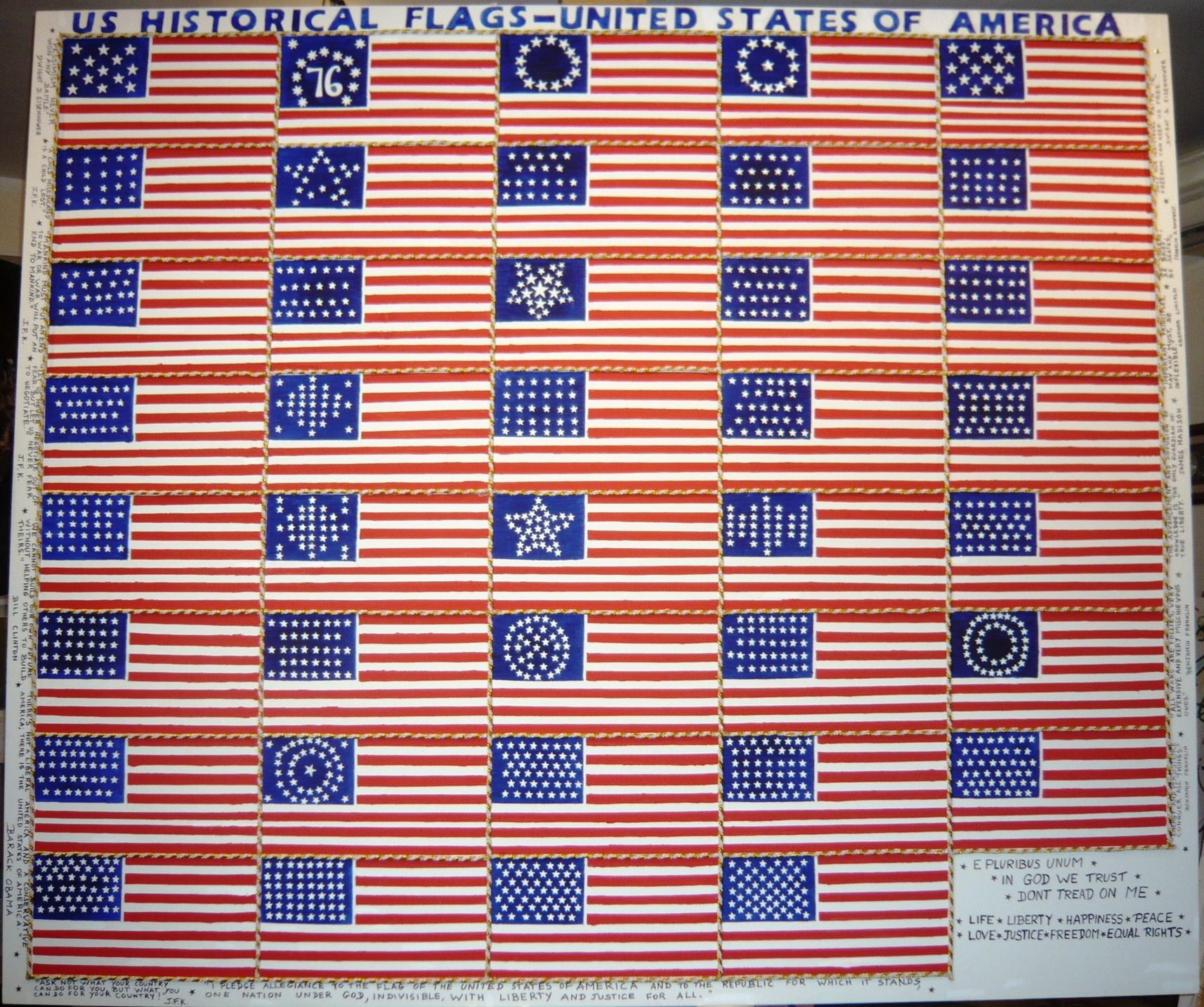
Oil painting depicting the 39 historical U.S. flags

In 1795, the number of stars and stripes was increased from 13 to 15 (to reflect the entry of Vermont and Kentucky as states of the Union). For a time, the flag was not changed when subsequent states were admitted, probably because it was thought that this would cause too much clutter. It was the 15-star, 15-stripe flag that inspired Francis Scott Key to write "Defence of Fort M'Henry", later known as "The Star-Spangled Banner", which is now the American national anthem. The flag is currently on display in the exhibition "The Star-Spangled Banner: The Flag That Inspired the National Anthem" at the Smithsonian Institution National Museum of American History in a two-story display chamber that protects the flag while it is on view.

On April 4, 1818, a plan was passed by Congress at the suggestion of U.S. Naval Captain Samuel C. Reid in which the flag was changed to have 20 stars, with a new star to be added when each new state was admitted, but the number of stripes would be reduced to 13 so as to honor the original colonies. The act specified that new flag designs should become official on the first July 4 (Independence Day) following the admission of one or more new states.

In 1912, the 48-star flag was adopted. This was the first time that a flag act specified an official arrangement of the stars in the canton, namely six rows of eight stars each, where each star would point upward. The U.S. Army and U.S. Navy, however, had already been using standardized designs. Throughout the 19th century, different star patterns, both rectangular and circular, had been abundant in civilian use.

In 1960, the current 50-star flag was adopted, incorporating the most recent change, from 49 stars to 50, when the present design was chosen, after Hawaii gained statehood in August 1959. Before that, the admission of Alaska in January 1959 had prompted the debut of a short-lived 49-star flag.

=== 49- and 50-star unions ===
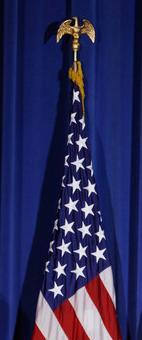
A U.S. flag with gold fringe and a gold eagle on top of the flag pole

When Alaska and Hawaii were being considered for statehood in the 1950s, more than 3,000 designs from the public were submitted to President Dwight D. Eisenhower's administration for consideration. Although some were 49-star versions, the vast majority were 50-star proposals. The earliest submission of a 50-star flag design was submitted in 1953, with most submissions arriving after the admission of Alaska in 1958 (the designs were diverse in media, from simple pencil sketches to professionally constructed flags). For the case of states admitted in 1912, a joint Army-Navy board submitted recommendations to the President on designs of a new flag, who eventually made the final choice; in that instance the War Department admitted to having received some 150 designs in 1912 from the public for consideration.

For the 49- and 50-state flags, on July 14, 1953 President Eisenhower declared his preferred method to select a flag design: by a joint committee with six members, three representatives from the Armed forces and one each from the Interior Department, State Department and Commission on Fine Arts. (In late 1958, the White House issued a press release stating that the Secretaries of State, Defense, and Treasury, along with the Chairman of the Commission on Fine Arts were appointed to informally propose the new flag designs to the President; this committee was responsible for formally submitted designs for the 50-star flag to the President on August 17, 1959.) On January 3, 1959, President Eisenhower issued Executive Order 10798 establishing the design of the 49-star flag, and on August 21, 1959, President Eisenhower issued Executive Order 10834 establishing the design of the (current) 50-star flag. At the time, credit was given by the executive department to the United States Army Institute of Heraldry for the design. The 49- and 50-star flags were each flown for the first time at Fort McHenry on Independence Day, in 1959 and 1960 respectively.

There is a popular account of Ohio teenager and later mayor of Napoleon, Ohio, Robert G. Heft, being the original designer of the 50-star flag, however no official account of this is known to exist. Like other informal submissions to the government, his submission closely resembled the design of the eventual 50-star American flag, and by the time Heft submitted his design, the final design probably had already been chosen. Biographer Alec Nevala-Lee investigated Heft's story, concluding that main details behind the story seem entirely fabricated.

On July 4, 2007, the 50-star flag became the longest-used version of the flag, surpassing the 48-star flag that was used from 1912 to 1959.

=== "Flower Flag" arrives in Asia ===
The U.S. flag was brought to the city of Canton (Guǎngzhōu) in China in 1784 by the merchant ship Empress of China, which carried a cargo of ginseng. There it gained the designation "Flower Flag" (Chinese: 花旗; pinyin: huāqí; Cantonese Yale: fākeì). According to a pseudonymous account first published in the Boston Courier and later retold by author and U.S. naval officer George H. Preble:

When the thirteen stripes and stars first appeared at Canton, much curiosity was excited among the people. News was circulated that a strange ship had arrived from the further end of the world, bearing a flag "as beautiful as a flower". Every body went to see the kwa kee chuen [花旗船; Fākeìsyùhn], or "flower flagship". This name at once established itself in the language, and America is now called the kwa kee kwoh [花旗國; Fākeìgwok], the "flower flag country"—and an American, kwa kee kwoh yin [花旗國人; Fākeìgwokyàhn]—"flower flag countryman"—a more complimentary designation than that of "red headed barbarian"—the name first bestowed upon the Dutch.

In the above quote, the Chinese words are written phonetically based on spoken Cantonese. The names given were common usage in the nineteenth and early twentieth centuries.

Chinese now refer to the United States as Měiguó from Mandarin (simplified Chinese: 美国; traditional Chinese: 美國). Měi is short for Měilìjiān (simplified Chinese: 美利坚; traditional Chinese: 美利堅, phono-semantic matching of "American") and "guó" means "country", so this name is unrelated to the flag. However, the "flower flag" terminology persists in some places today: for example, American ginseng is called flower flag ginseng (simplified Chinese: 花旗参; traditional Chinese: 花旗參) in Chinese, and Citibank, which opened a branch in China in 1902, is known as Flower Flag Bank (花旗银行).

Similarly, Vietnamese also uses the borrowed term from Chinese with Sino-Vietnamese reading for the United States, as Hoa Kỳ from 花旗 ("Flower Flag"). Even though the United States is also called nước Mỹ (or simpler Mỹ) colloquially in Vietnamese before the name Měiguó was popular among Chinese, Hoa Kỳ is always recognized as the formal name for the United States with the Vietnamese state officially designates it as Hợp chúng quốc Hoa Kỳ ( chữ Hán: 合眾國花旗, lit. 'United states of the Flower Flag'). By that, in Vietnam, the U.S. is also nicknamed xứ Cờ Hoa ("land of Flower Flag") based on the Hoa Kỳ designation.

Additionally, the seal of Shanghai Municipal Council in Shanghai International Settlement from 1869 included the U.S. flag as part of the top left-hand shield near the flag of the UK, as the U.S. participated in the creation of this enclave in the Chinese city of Shanghai. It is also included in the badge of the Gulangyu Municipal Police in the International Settlement of Gulangyu, Amoy.

President Richard Nixon presented a U.S. flag and Moon rocks to Mao Zedong during his visit to China in 1972. They are now on display at the National Museum of China.

The U.S. flag took its first trip around the world in 1787–1790 on board the Columbia. William Driver, who coined the phrase "Old Glory", took the U.S. flag around the world in 1831–32. The flag attracted the notice of the Japanese when an oversized version was carried to Yokohama by the steamer Great Republic as part of a round-the-world journey in 1871.

=== Civil War and the flag ===
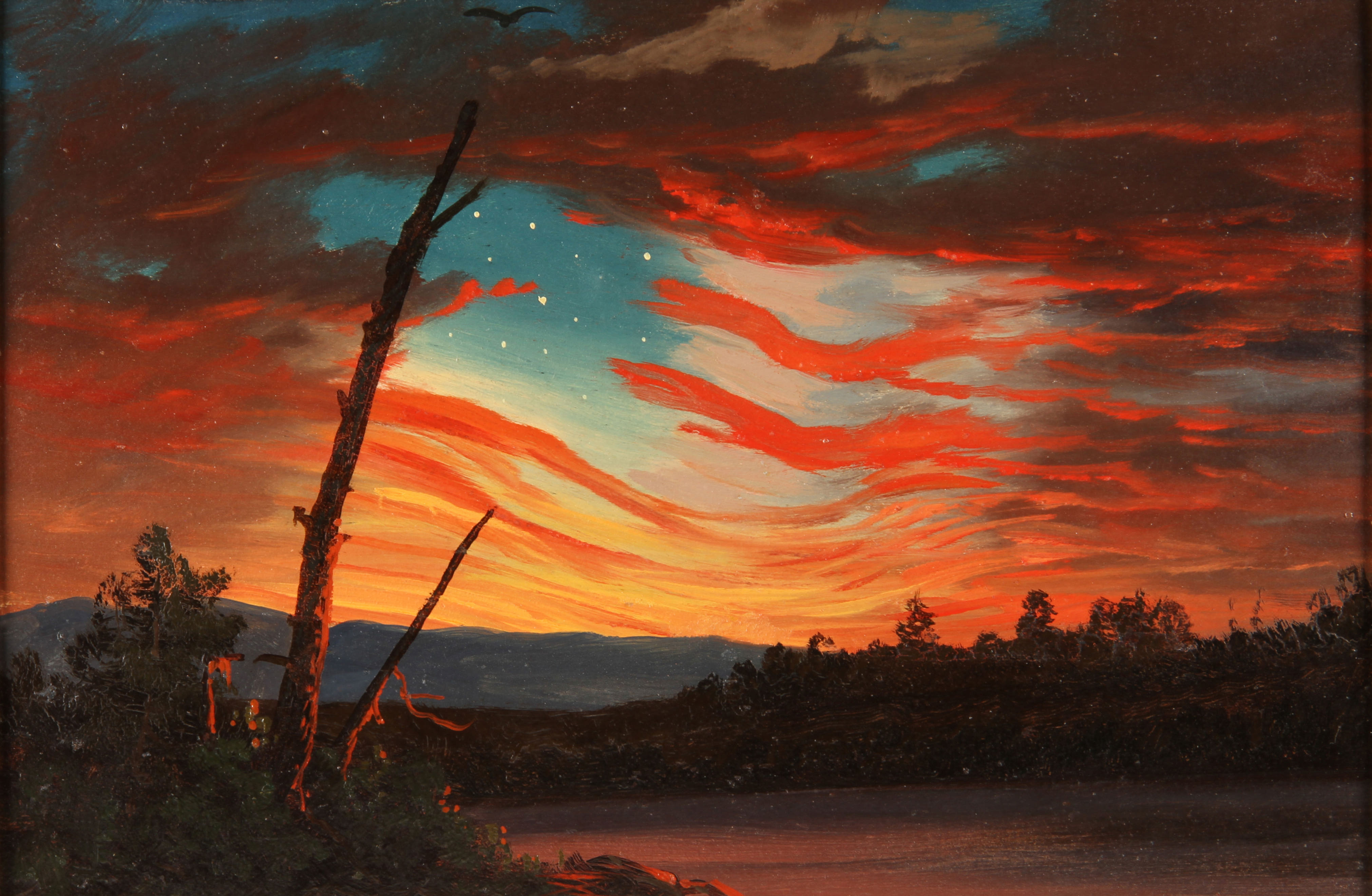
Our Banner in the Sky (1861) by Frederic Edwin Church

Prior to the Civil War, the American flag was rarely seen outside of military forts, government buildings and ships. This changed following the Battle of Fort Sumter in 1861. The flag flying over the fort was allowed to leave with the Union troops as they surrendered. It was taken across Northern cities, which spurred a wave of "Flagmania". The Stars and Stripes, which had had no real place in the public conscious, suddenly became a part of the national identity. The flag became a symbol of the Union, and the sale of flags exploded at this time. Historian Adam Goodheart wrote:

For the first time American flags were mass-produced rather than individually stitched and even so, manufacturers could not keep up with demand. As the long winter of 1861 turned into spring, that old flag meant something new. The abstraction of the Union cause was transfigured into a physical thing: strips of cloth that millions of people would fight for, and many thousands die for.

In the Civil War, the flag was allowed to be carried into battle, reversing the 1847 regulation which prohibited this. (During the American Revolutionary War and War of 1812 the army was not officially sanctioned to carry the United States flag into battle. It was not until 1834 that the artillery was allowed to carry the American flag; the army would be granted to do the same in 1841. However, in 1847, in the middle of the war with Mexico, the flag was limited to camp use and not allowed to be brought into battle.) Some wanted to remove the stars of the states which had seceded but Abraham Lincoln was opposed, believing it would give legitimacy to the Confederate states' claim that unilateral secession was effective.

=== Historical progression of designs ===
In the following table depicting the 28 various designs of the United States flag, the star patterns for the flags are merely the usual patterns, often associated with the United States Navy. Canton designs, prior to the proclamation of the 48-star flag, had no official arrangement of the stars.

Number of stars (OEIS: A140646)	Number of stripes	Design(s)	Arrangement of stars	States represented by new stars	Dates in use	Duration
0	13		—N/a	Continental Union Flag: Connecticut, Delaware, Georgia, Maryland, Massachusetts Bay, New Hampshire, New Jersey, New York, North Carolina, Pennsylvania, Rhode Island and Providence Plantations, South Carolina, Virginia represented by stripes, no stars	December 3, 1775 – June 14, 1777	1 1/2 years
13	13		Various: 3–2–3–2–3 or Square or Circle or Oval or ellipse of 10 stars with 3 in a row in the middle or 1–4–3–4–1 or 4–5–4 or 5–3–5	Connecticut, Delaware, Georgia, Maryland, Massachusetts, New Hampshire, New Jersey, New York, North Carolina, Pennsylvania, Rhode Island, South Carolina, Virginia	June 14, 1777 – May 1, 1795	18 years
15	15		5 rows of 3	Vermont, Kentucky	May 1, 1795 – July 3, 1818	23 years
20	13		4 rows of 5 or Pentagram	Tennessee, Ohio, Louisiana, Indiana, Mississippi	July 4, 1818 – July 3, 1819	1 year
21	13		5–4–6–6 or Pentagram with a star in center	Illinois	July 4, 1819 – July 3, 1820	1 year
23	13		6–5–6–6 or 5–4–5–4–5	Alabama, Maine	July 4, 1820 – July 3, 1822	2 years
24	13		4 rows of 6	Missouri	July 4, 1822 – July 3, 1836; 1831 term "Old Glory" coined	14 years
25	13		6–5–7–7 or 5 rows of 5	Arkansas	July 4, 1836 – July 3, 1837	1 year
26	13		7–6–6–7 or Inverted pentagram with large star in center	Michigan	July 4, 1837 – July 3, 1845	8 years
27	13		7–6–7–7	Florida	July 4, 1845 – July 3, 1846	1 year
28	13		4 rows of 7	Texas	July 4, 1846 – July 3, 1847	1 year
29	13		8–7–6–8 or Diamond pattern	Iowa	July 4, 1847 – July 3, 1848	1 year
30	13		5 rows of 6	Wisconsin	July 4, 1848 – July 3, 1851	3 years
31	13		7–5–6–6–7	California	July 4, 1851 – July 3, 1858	7 years
32	13		7–6–6–6–7	Minnesota	July 4, 1858 – July 3, 1859	1 year
33	13		7–7–5–7–7 or Various patterns	Oregon	July 4, 1859 – July 3, 1861	2 years
34	13		7–7–6–7–7 or 6–1–6–1–6–1–6–1–6 or Circle pattern	Kansas	July 4, 1861 – July 3, 1863	2 years
35	13		5 rows of 7 or Circle pattern	West Virginia	July 4, 1863 – July 3, 1865	2 years
36	13		8–6–8–6–8 or 6 rows of 6 or Wagon wheel pattern	Nevada	July 4, 1865 – July 3, 1867	2 years
37	13		7–8–7–8–7 or 8–7–7–7–8 or Two concentric rings	Nebraska	July 4, 1867 – July 3, 1877	10 years
38	13		7–8–8–8–7 or 8–7–8–7–8 or 7–5–7–7–5–7 or 8–8–6–8–8 or Circle pattern	Colorado	July 4, 1877 – July 3, 1890	13 years
43	13		8–7–7–7–7–7	North Dakota, South Dakota, Montana, Washington, Idaho	July 4, 1890 – July 3, 1891	1 year
44	13		8–7–7–7–7–8	Wyoming	July 4, 1891 – July 3, 1896	5 years
45	13		8–7–8–7–8–7	Utah	July 4, 1896 – July 3, 1908	12 years
46	13		8–7–8–8–7–8	Oklahoma	July 4, 1908 – July 3, 1912	4 years
48	13		6 rows of 8	New Mexico, Arizona	July 4, 1912 – July 3, 1959	47 years
49	13		7 rows of 7	Alaska	July 4, 1959 – July 3, 1960	1 year
50	13		6–5–6–5–6–5–6–5–6	Hawaii	July 4, 1960 – present	66 years

== Symbolism ==
The flag of the United States is the nation's most widely recognized symbol. Within the United States, flags are frequently displayed on both public buildings and private residences. The flag is a common motif on decals for car windows, and on clothing ornamentation such as badges and lapel pins. Owing to the United States's emergence as a superpower in the 20th century, the flag is among the most widely recognized symbols in the world, and is used to represent the United States.

The flag has become a powerful symbol of Americanism, and is flown on many occasions, with giant outdoor flags used by retail outlets to draw customers. Reverence for the flag has at times reached religion-like fervor: in 1919 William Norman Guthrie's book The Religion of Old Glory discussed "the cult of the flag" and formally proposed vexillolatry.

Despite a number of attempts to ban the practice, desecration of the flag remains protected as free speech under the First Amendment to the United States Constitution. Scholars have noted the irony that "[t]he flag is so revered because it represents the land of the free, and that freedom includes the ability to use or abuse that flag in protest". Comparing practice worldwide, Testi noted in 2010 that the United States was not unique in adoring its banner, for the flags of Scandinavian countries are also "beloved, domesticated, commercialized and sacralized objects".

=== Color symbolism ===
When the flag was officially adopted in 1777, the colors of red, white, and blue were not given an official meaning. However, when Charles Thomson, Secretary of the Continental Congress, presented a proposed U.S. seal in 1782, he explained its center section in this way:

The colours of the pales are those used in the flag of the United States of America; White signifies purity and innocence, Red, hardiness & valor, and Blue, the colour of the Chief signifies vigilance, perseverance & justice.

Flower wreath placed by Joe Biden at the John McCain Memorial Marker in Hanoi, designed with the three colors of the national flag.

These meanings have broadly been accepted as official, with some variation, but there are other extant interpretations as well:

- Henry Ward Beecher said of the Fort Sumter Flag upon its 1865 return to the fort,
  The stars that redeem the night from darkness, and the beams of red light that beautify the morning, have been united upon its folds. As long as the sun endures, or the stars, may it wave over a nation neither enslaved nor enslaving.
- In 1986, president Ronald Reagan gave his own interpretation, saying,
  The colors of our flag signify the qualities of the human spirit we Americans cherish. Red for courage and readiness to sacrifice; white for pure intentions and high ideals; and blue for vigilance and justice.
- An interpretation attributed to George Washington claims that
  We take the stars from heaven, the red from our mother country, separating it by white stripes, thus showing that we have separated from her, and the white stripes shall go down to posterity, representing our liberty.

== Design ==
=== Specifications ===

The basic design of the current flag is specified by 4 U.S.C. § 1 (1947): "The flag of the United States shall be thirteen horizontal stripes, alternate red and white; and the union of the flag shall be forty-eight stars, white in a blue field." 4 U.S.C. § 2 outlines the addition of new stars to represent new states, with no distinction made for the shape, size, or arrangement of the stars. Executive Order 10834 (1959) specifies a 50-star design for use after Hawaii was added as a state, and Federal Specification DDD-F-416F (2005) provides additional details about the production of physical flags for use by federal agencies.

- Hoist (height) of the flag: A = 1.0
- Fly (width) of the flag: B = 1.9
- Hoist (height) of the canton ("union"): C = 0.5385 (A × 7/13, spanning seven stripes)
- Fly (width) of the canton: D = 0.76 (B × 2/5, two-fifths of the flag width)
- E = F = 0.0538 (C/10, one-tenth of the height of the canton)
- G = H = 0.0633 (D/12, one twelfth of the width of the canton)
- Diameter of star: K = 0.0616 (approximately L × 4/5, four-fifths of the stripe width)
- Width of stripe: L = 0.0769 (A/13, one thirteenth of the flag height)

The executive order establishing these specifications directly governs only flags made for or by the federal government, but it is also used as the definition of the flag in the Flag Code. In practice, most U.S. national flags available for sale to the public follow the federal star arrangement, but have a different width-to-height ratio; common sizes are 2 × 3 ft. or 4 × 6 ft. (flag ratio 1.5), 2.5 × 4 ft. or 5 × 8 ft. (1.6), or 3 × 5 ft. or 6 × 10 ft. (1.667). Even flags flown over the U.S. Capitol for sale to the public through Representatives or Senators are provided in these sizes. Flags that are made to the prescribed 1.9 ratio are often referred to as "G-spec" (for "government specification") flags.

=== Colors ===
The red, white, and blue colors are derived from the flag of the United Kingdom. The flag colors are not standardized by law, and there are no legally specified shades of red, white, and blue. Despite this, some government agencies have specified the use of certain shades.

Federal Specification DDD-F-416E specifies shades of red, white, and blue to be used for physical flags procured by federal agencies with reference to the Standard Color Card of America 10th edition, a set of dyed silk fabric samples produced by The Color Association of the United States. The colors are "White" No. 70001, "Old Glory Red" No. 70180, and "Old Glory Blue" No. 70075. There are no easy or proper methods for converting these colors to digital colors.

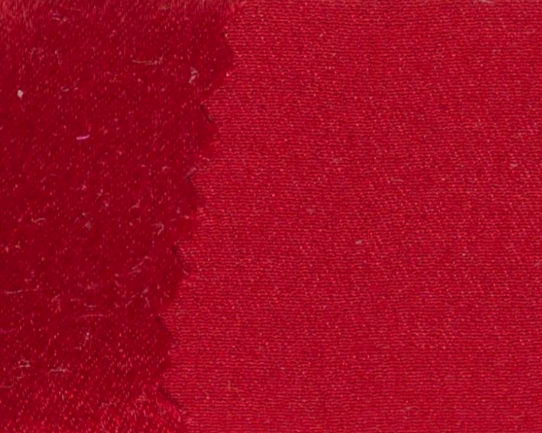
"Old Glory Red" No. 70180

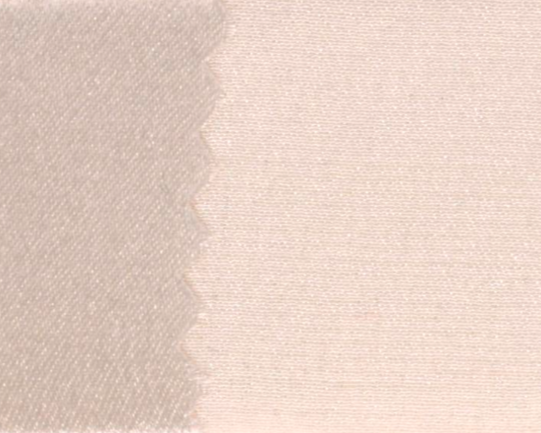
"White" No. 70001

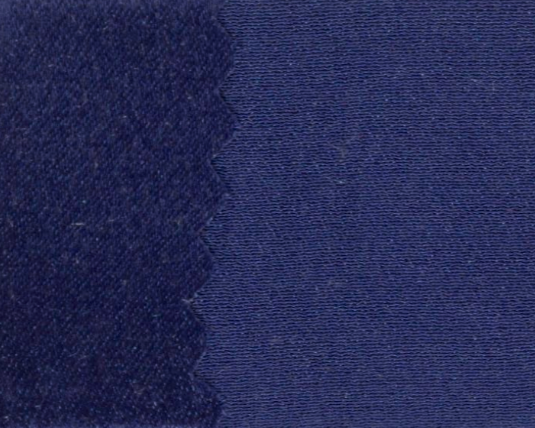
"Old Glory Blue" No. 70075

According to the California flag code, "Old Glory Red" No. 70180 should be used as red on the California state flag. In 2002, the California Military Department suggested PMS 200C as a Pantone color equivalent.

Several government websites have given Pantone (PMS) equivalents for the flag colors. These colors are "Old Glory Red" PMS 193C and "Old Glory Blue" PMS 281C. When converted to RGB, the colors are "Old Glory Red" #BF0A30, "Old Glory Blue" #00205B, and #FFFFFF for white.

Pantone specifications

Pantone color specifications
Pantone Identifier	RGB				CMYK			
Pantone Identifier	R	G	B	8-bit hex	C	M	Y	K
White	255	255	255	#FFFFFF	0.00	0.00	0.00	0.00
PMS 193C	191	10	48	#BF0A30	0.00	0.95	0.75	0.25
PMS 281C	0	32	91	#00205B	1.00	0.65	0.00	0.64

The specific shade of Pantone blue varies in government sources. Blue is either listed as PMS 281C, or as PMS 282C.

As early as 1996, the website of the U.S. embassy in London listed red PMS 193C and blue PMS 282C. They later changed blue to be PMS 281C. The website of the U.S. embassy in Stockholm claimed in 2001 that those colors had been suggested by Pantone, and that the U.S. Government Printing Office preferred a different set. Red PMS 186C and blue PMS 288C are preferred by the U.S. Government Printing Office.

U.S. Government Printing Office color specifications

U.S. Government Printing Office specifications
Pantone Identifier	RGB				CMYK			
Pantone Identifier	R	G	B	8-bit hex	C	M	Y	K
White	255	255	255	#FFFFFF	0.00	0.00	0.00	0.00
PMS 186C	187	19	62	#C8102E	0.00	0.90	0.67	0.27
PMS 288C	0	45	114	#002D72	1.00	0.61	0.00	0.55

In 2001, the Texas legislature specified that the colors of the Texas flag should be "(1) the same colors used in the United States flag; and (2) defined as numbers 193 (red) and 281 (dark blue) of the Pantone Matching System."

The U.S. Millennium Challenge Corporation on their website listed red PMS 193C and blue PMS 281C as the flag colors.

The United States Department of State recognizes red PMS 193C and blue PMS 282C, though they also suggest alternate shades of red and blue and give RGB and CMYK conversions.

U.S. Department of State color specifications

United States Department of State specifications
Color	RGB				CMYK			
Color	R	G	B	8-bit hex	C	M	Y	K
White	255	255	255	#FFFFFF	0.00	0.00	0.00	0.00
Red	187	19	62	#BB133E	0.00	0.90	0.67	0.27
Blue	0	33	71	#002147	1.00	0.54	0.00	0.72

The current internal style guide of the State Department Bureau of Educational and Cultural Affairs recognizes red PMS 193C and blue PMS 282C, though it also suggests alternate shades of red and blue and gives RGB and CMYK conversions generated by Adobe InDesign.

DoS Bureau of Educational and Cultural Affairs color specifications

Bureau of Educational and Cultural Affairs specifications
Color	RGB				CMYK			
Color	R	G	B	8-bit hex	C	M	Y	K
White	255	255	255	#FFFFFF	0.00	0.00	0.00	0.00
Red	179	25	66	#B31942	0.00	1.00	0.66	0.13
Blue	10	49	97	#0A3161	0.90	0.49	0.00	0.62

Other colors are often used for mass-market flags, printed reproductions, and other products intended to evoke flag colors. The practice of using more saturated colors than the official cloth is not new. As Taylor, Knoche, and Granville wrote in 1950: "The color of the official wool bunting [of the blue field] is a very dark blue, but printed reproductions of the flag, as well as merchandise supposed to match the flag, present the color as a deep blue much brighter than the official wool."

These colors are standardized for producing physical fabric flags, ensuring they look identical regardless of manufacturer, and are distinct from digital (RGB) approximations.

=== Decoration ===
Traditionally, the flag may be decorated with golden fringe surrounding the perimeter of the flag as long as it does not deface the flag proper. Ceremonial displays of the flag, such as those in parades or on indoor posts, often use fringe to enhance the flag's appearance. Traditionally, the Army and Air Force use a fringed flag for parades, color guard and indoor display, while the Navy, Marine Corps, and Coast Guard use a fringeless flag for all occasions.

The first recorded use of fringe on a flag dates from 1835, and the Army used it officially in 1895. No specific law governs the legality of fringe. Still, a 1925 opinion of the United States Attorney General addresses the use of fringe (and the number of stars) "is at the discretion of the Commander in Chief of the Army and Navy" as quoted from a footnote in previous volumes of Title 4 of the United States Code law books. This opinion is a source for claims that a flag with fringe is a military ensign rather than a civilian. However, according to the Army Institute of Heraldry, which has official custody of U.S. flag designs and makes any change ordered, there are no implications of symbolism in using fringe.

Individuals associated with the sovereign citizen movement and tax protester conspiracy arguments have claimed, based on the military usage, that the presence of a fringed flag in a civilian courtroom changes the nature or jurisdiction of the court. Federal and state courts have rejected this contention.

== Display and use ==
The flag is customarily flown year-round at most public buildings, and it is not unusual to find private houses flying full-size (3 by 5 feet (0.91 by 1.52 m)) flags. Some private use is year-round, but becomes widespread on civic holidays like Memorial Day, Veterans Day, Presidents' Day, Flag Day, and on Independence Day. On Memorial Day, it is common to place small flags by war memorials and next to the graves of U.S. war veterans. Also, on Memorial Day, it is common to fly the flag at half staff until noon to remember those who lost their lives fighting in U.S. wars.

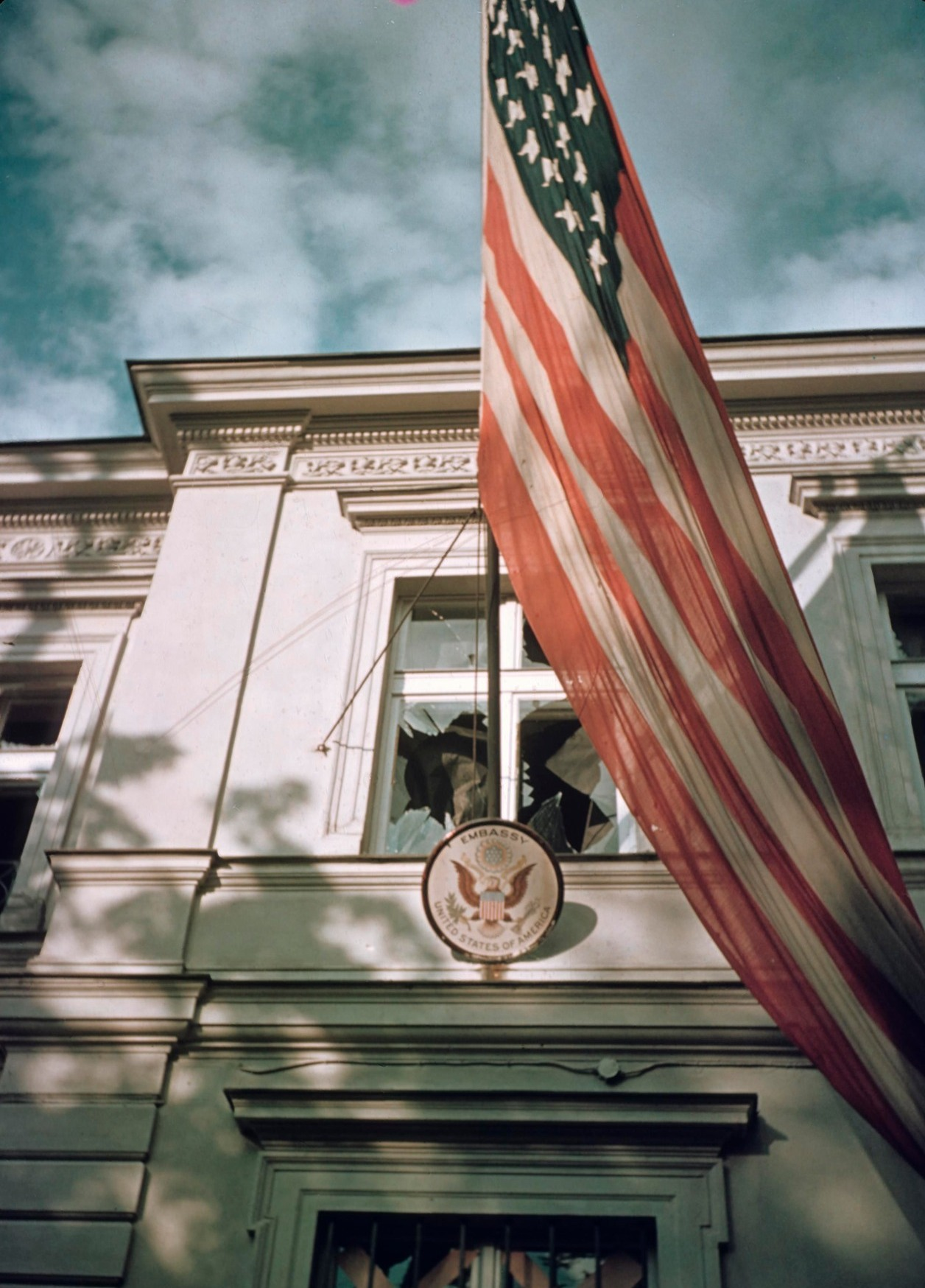
An American flag on the U.S. embassy in Warsaw during a German air raid in September 1939.

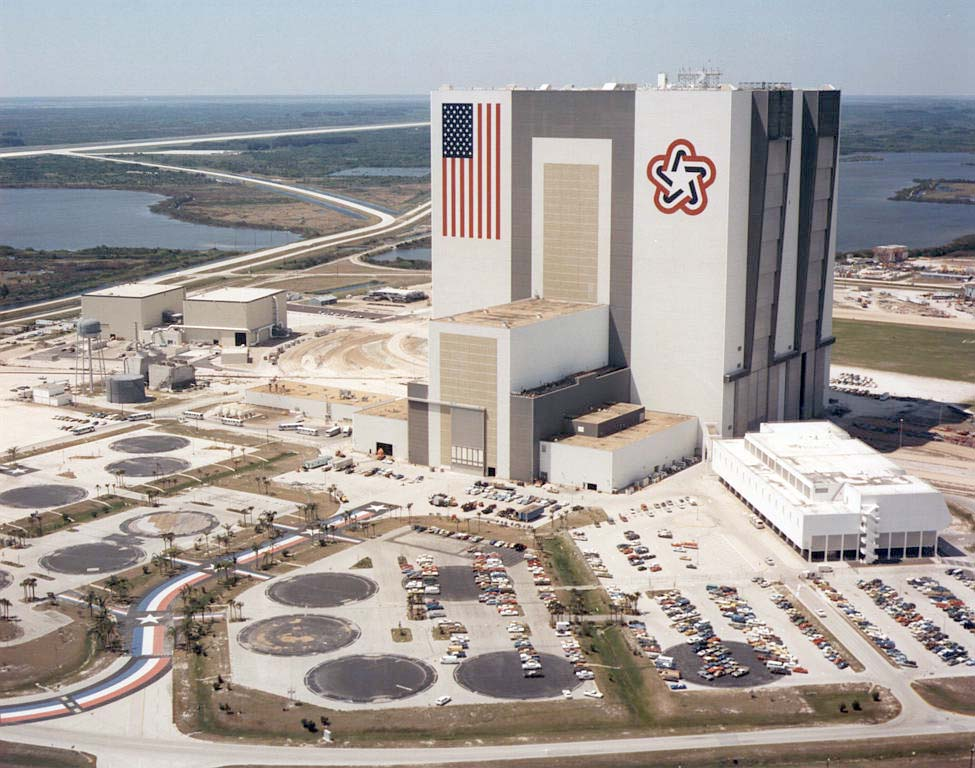
The NASA Vehicle Assembly Building in 1977. The VAB has the largest U.S. flag ever used on a building, with the Bicentennial Star opposite the flag.

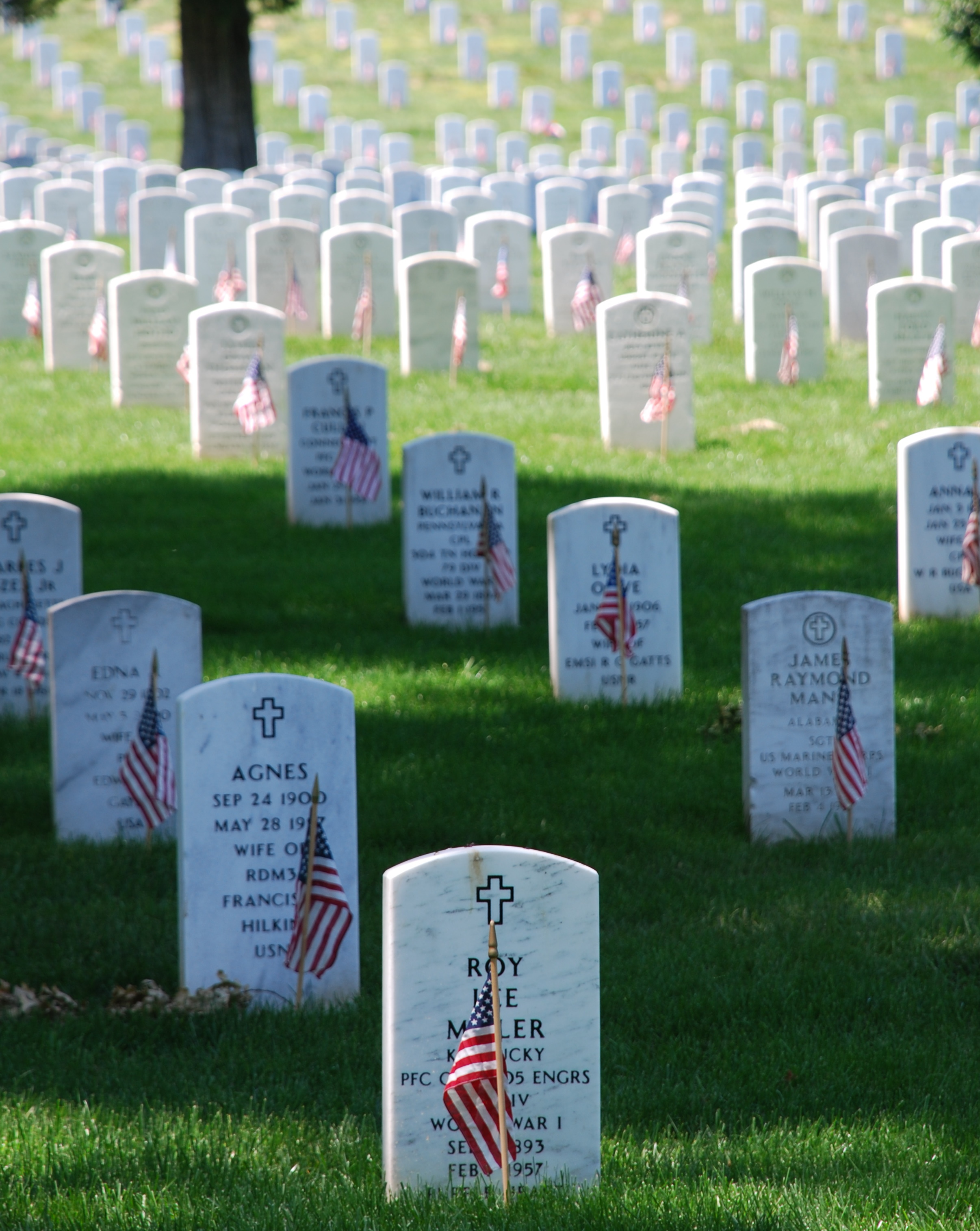
Gravestones at Arlington National Cemetery decorated with U.S. flags on Memorial Day.

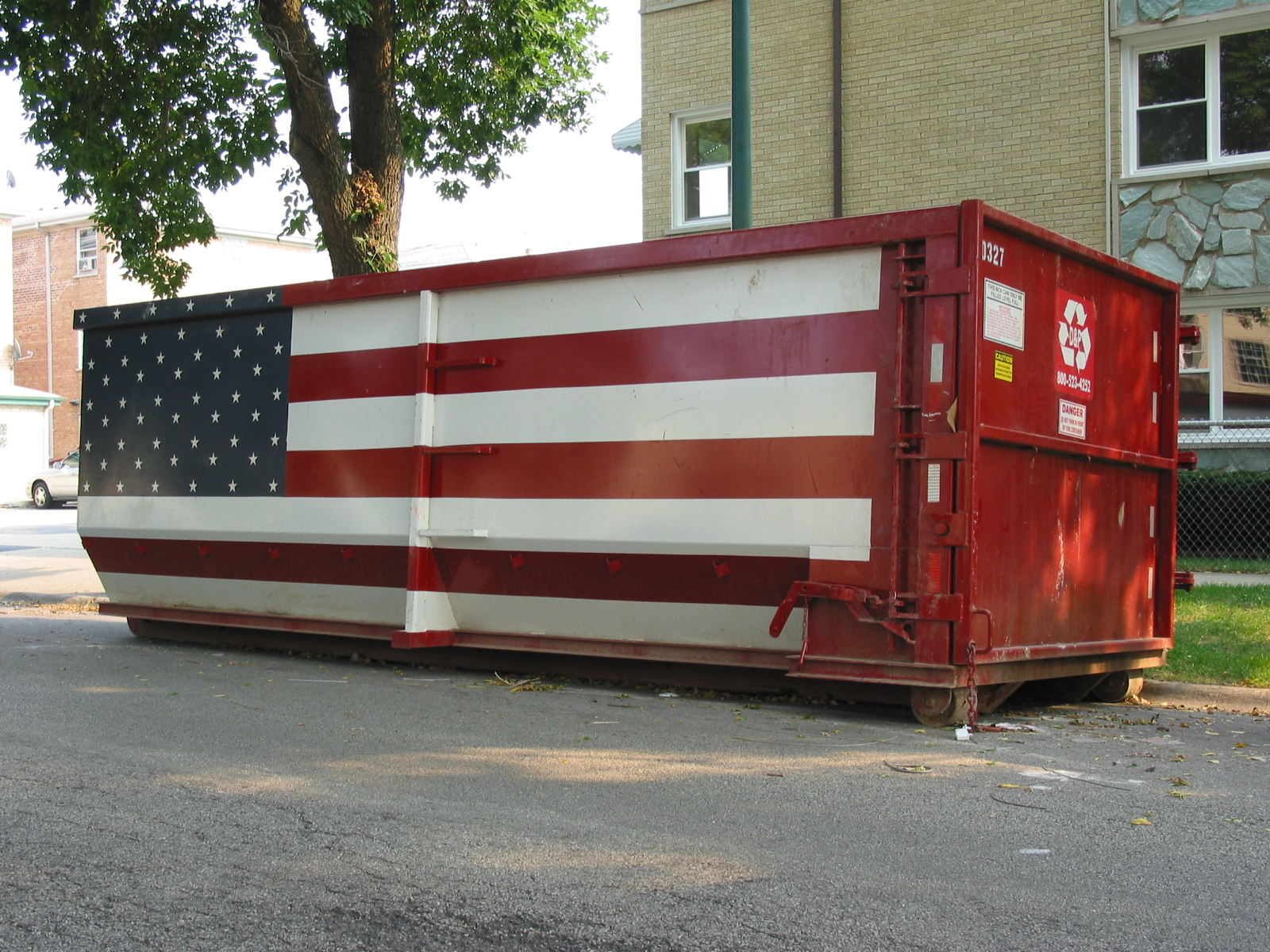
A dumpster in Chicago painted to resemble the American flag.

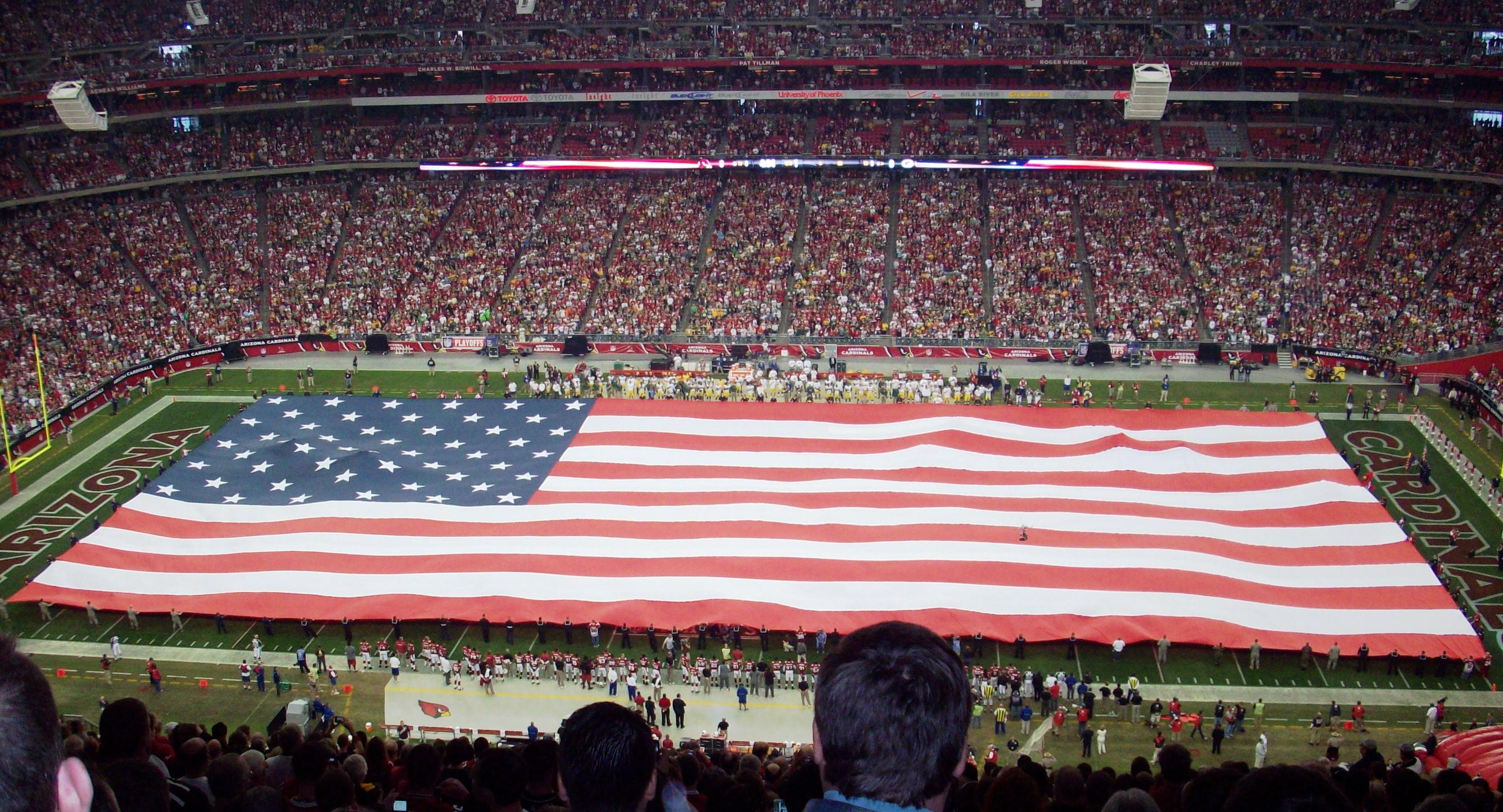
A large flag displayed during the singing of The Star-Spangled Banner prior to the start of an NFL game.

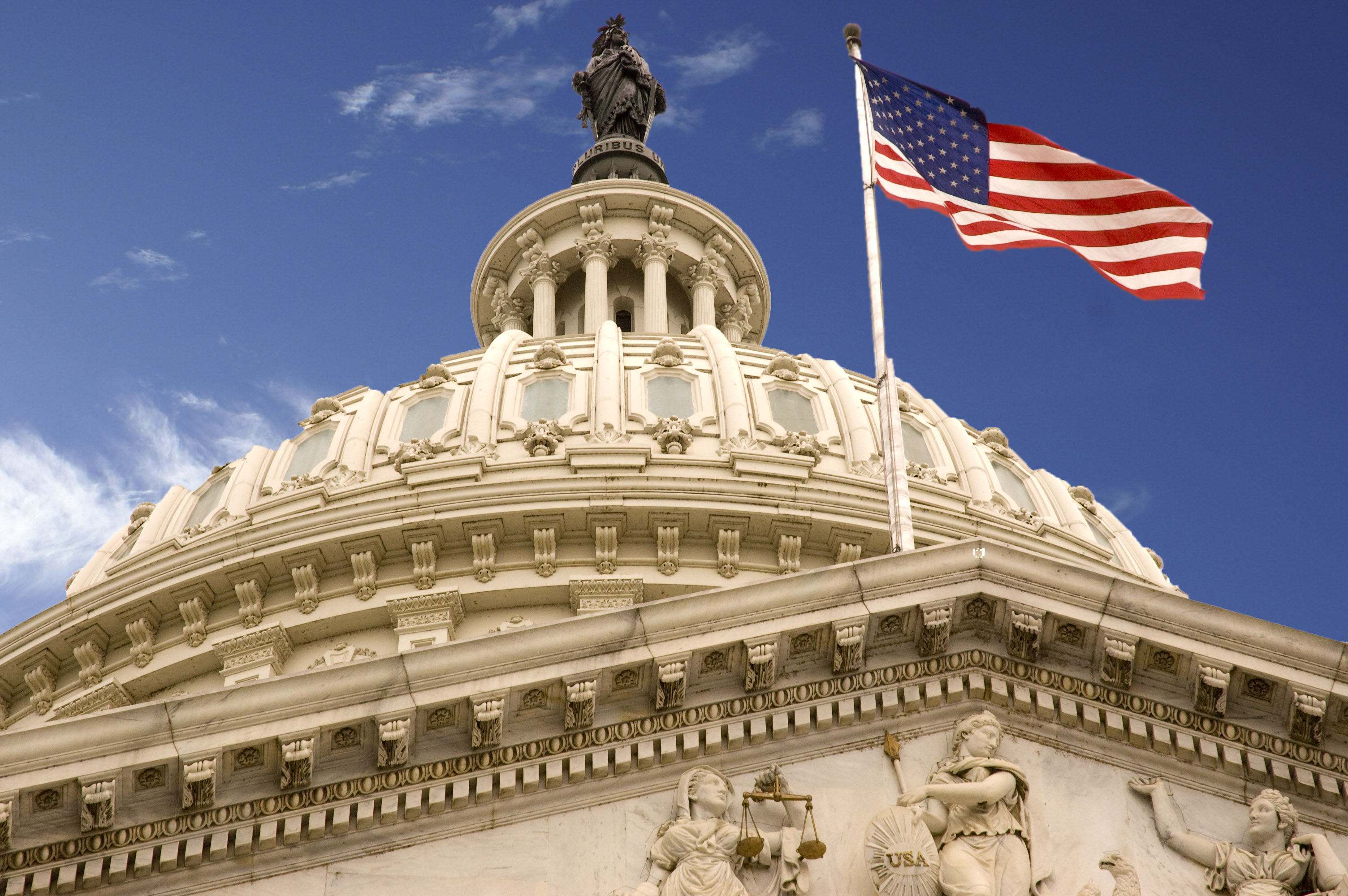
The flag at the United States Capitol.

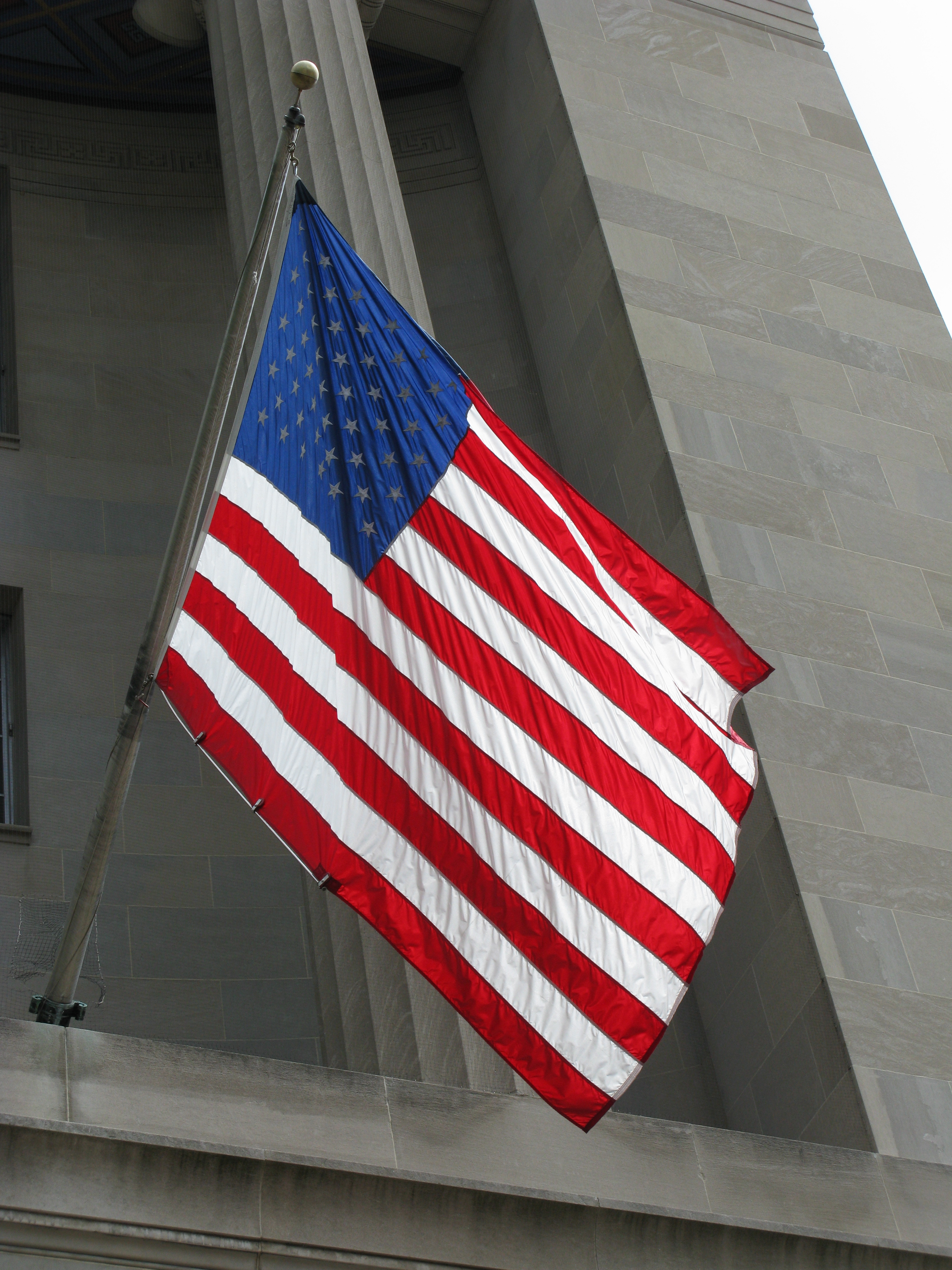
The flag on the Robert F. Kennedy Department of Justice Building.

=== Flag etiquette ===
The proper stationary vertical display. The union (blue box of stars) should always be in the upper-left corner.

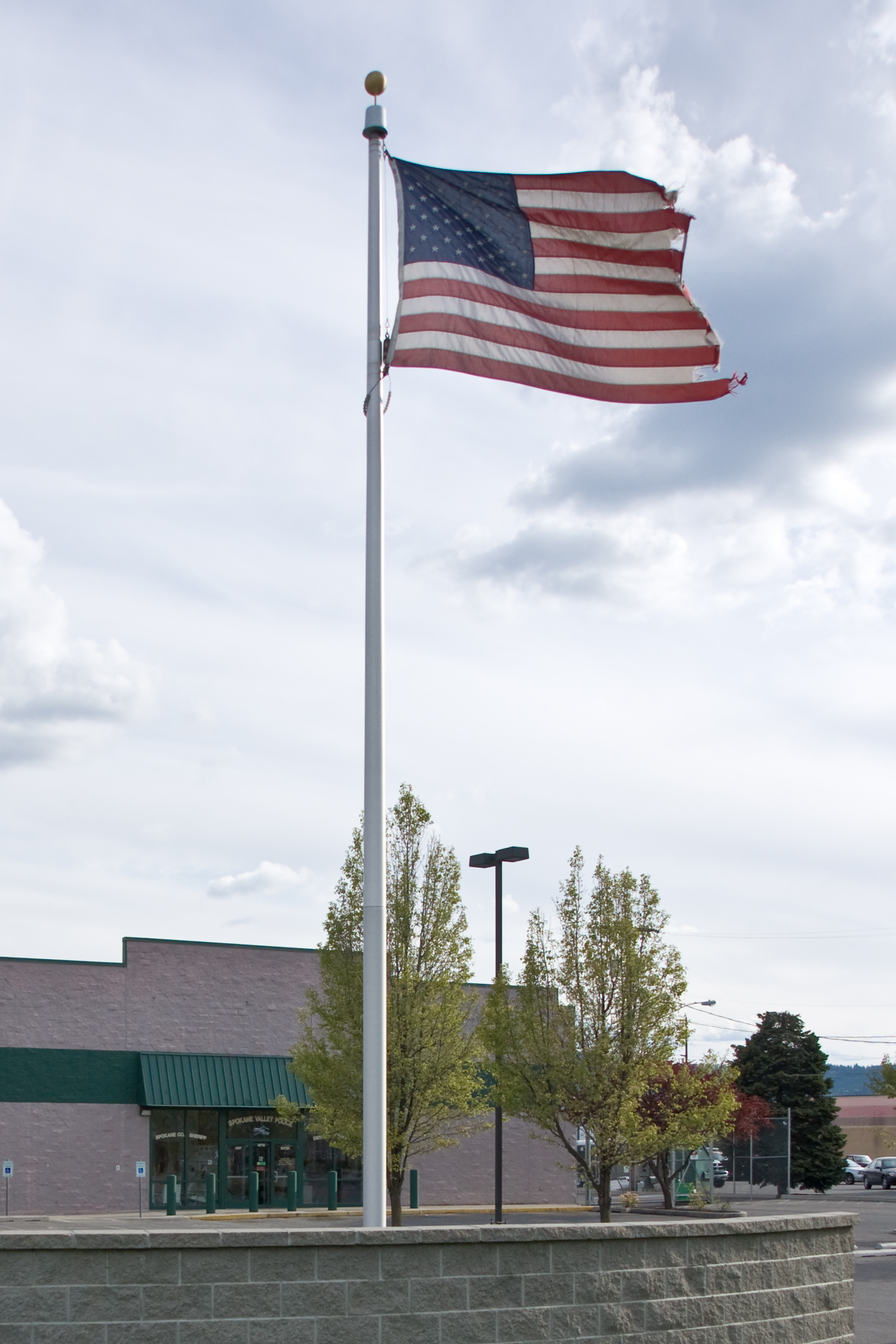
A tattered flag at Spokane Valley Police Headquarters, Spokane, Washington

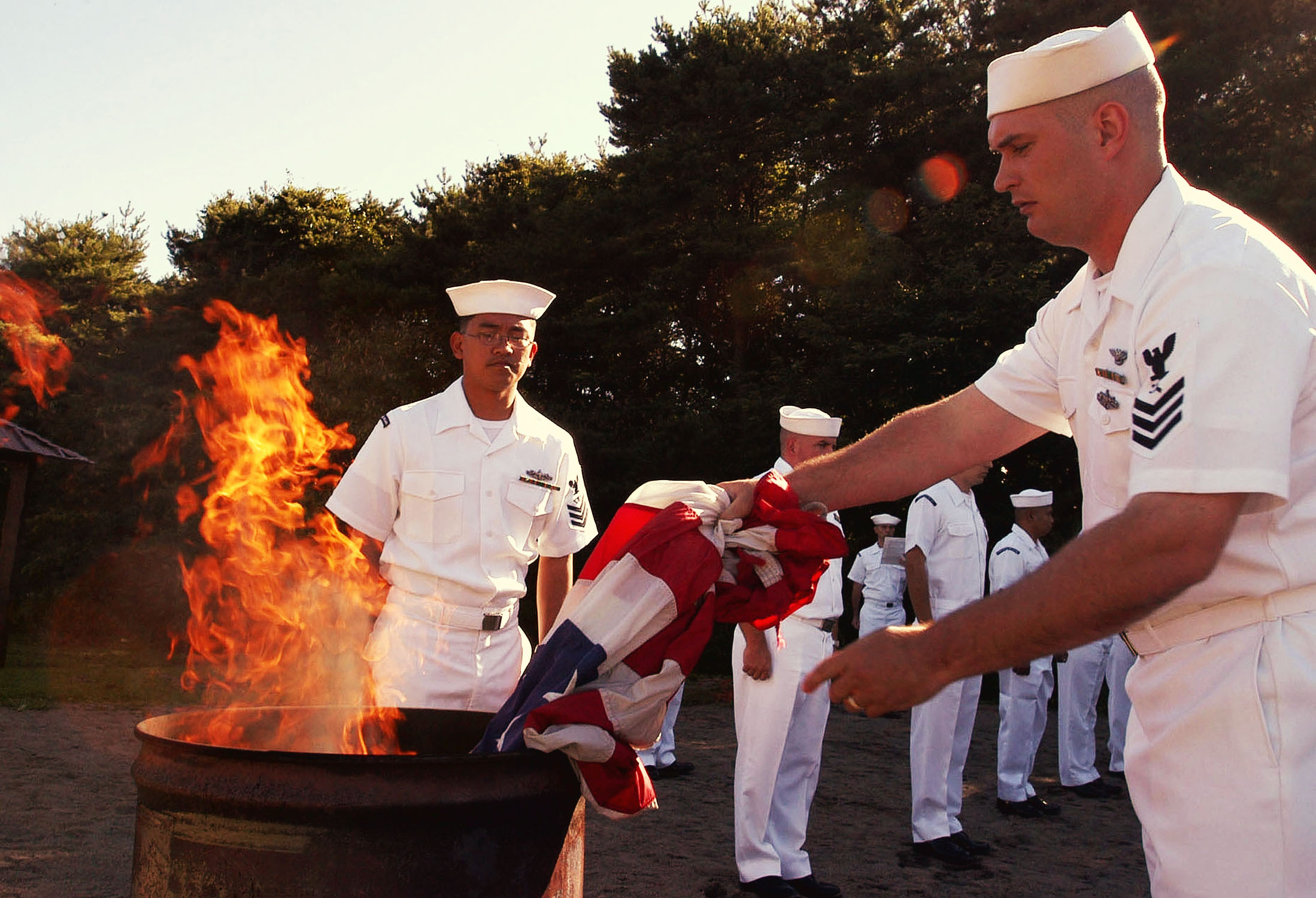
A proper and respectful manner of disposing of a damaged flag is a ceremonial burning (as seen here at Misawa Air Base)

The United States Flag Code outlines certain guidelines for the flag's use, display, and disposal. For example, the flag should never be dipped to any person or thing, unless it is the ensign responding to a salute from a ship of a foreign nation. This tradition may come from the 1908 Summer Olympics in London, where countries were asked to dip their flag to King Edward VII: the American flag bearer did not. Team captain Martin Sheridan is famously quoted as saying, "this flag dips to no earthly king", though the true provenance of this quotation is unclear.

The flag should never be allowed to touch the ground and should be illuminated if flown at night. The flag should be repaired or replaced if the edges become tattered through wear. When a flag is so tattered that it can no longer serve as a symbol of the United States, it should be destroyed in a dignified manner, preferably by burning. The American Legion and other organizations regularly conduct flag retirement ceremonies, often on Flag Day, June 14. (The Boy Scouts of America recommends that modern nylon or polyester flags be recycled instead of burned due to hazardous gases produced when such materials are burned.)

The Flag Code prohibits using the flag "for any advertising purpose" and also states that the flag "should not be embroidered, printed, or otherwise impressed on such articles as cushions, handkerchiefs, napkins, boxes, or anything intended to be discarded after temporary use". Both of these codes are generally ignored, almost always without comment.

Section 8, entitled "Respect For Flag", states in part: "The flag should never be used as wearing apparel, bedding, or drapery", and "No part of the flag should ever be used as a costume or athletic uniform". Section 3 of the Flag Code defines "the flag" as anything "by which the average person seeing the same without deliberation may believe the same to represent the flag of the United States of America". An additional provision that is frequently violated at sporting events is part (c) "The flag should never be carried flat or horizontally, but always aloft and free."

Although the Flag Code is U.S. federal law, there is no penalty for a private citizen or group failing to comply with the Flag Code, and it is not widely enforced—punitive enforcement would conflict with the First Amendment right to freedom of speech. Passage of the proposed Flag Desecration Amendment would overrule the legal precedent that has been established.

=== Display on vehicles ===
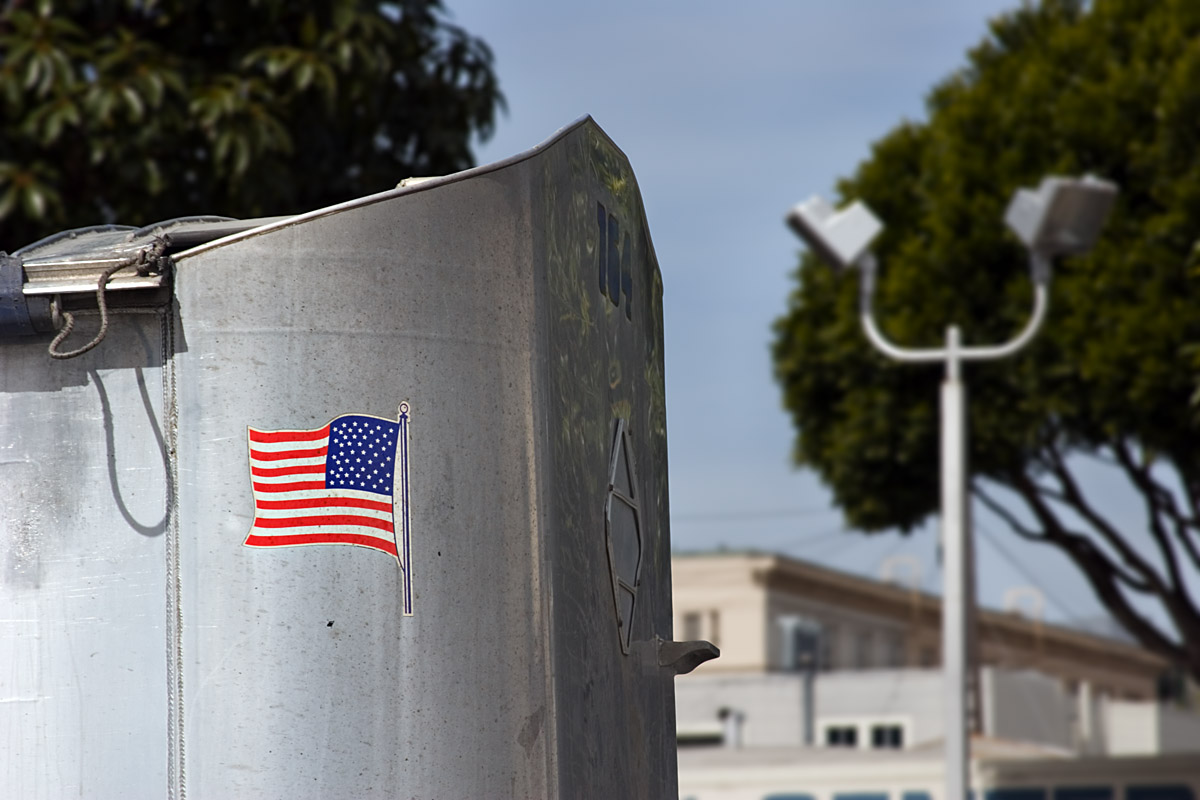
Truck with sticker showing the flag as if moving forward with the truck

When the flag is affixed to the right side of a vehicle of any kind (e.g., cars, boats, planes, any physical object that moves), it should be oriented so that the canton is towards the front of the vehicle, as if the flag were streaming backward from its hoist as the vehicle moves forward. Therefore, U.S. flag decals on the right sides of vehicles may appear to be reversed, with the union to the observer's right instead of left as more commonly seen.

The flag has been displayed on every U.S. spacecraft designed for crewed flight starting from John Glenn's Friendship 7 flight in 1962, including Mercury, Gemini, Apollo Command/Service Module, Apollo Lunar Module, and the Space Shuttle. The flag also appeared on the S-IC first stage of the Saturn V launch vehicle used for Apollo. Nevertheless, Mercury, Gemini, and Apollo were launched and landed vertically instead of horizontally as the Space Shuttle did on its landing approach, so the streaming convention was not followed. These flags were oriented with the stripes running horizontally, perpendicular to the direction of flight.

=== Display on uniforms ===
On some U.S. military uniforms, flag patches are worn on the right shoulder, following the vehicle convention with the union toward the front. This rule dates back to the Army's early history when mounted cavalry and infantry units would designate a standard-bearer who carried the Colors into battle. As he charged, his forward motion caused the flag to stream back. Since the Stars and Stripes are mounted with the canton closest to the pole, that section stayed to the right, while the stripes flew to the left. Several U.S. military uniforms, such as flight suits worn by members of the United States Air Force and Navy, have the flag patch on the left shoulder.

Other organizations that wear flag patches on their uniforms can have the flag facing in either direction. The congressional charter of the Boy Scouts of America stipulates that Boy Scout uniforms should not imitate U.S. military uniforms; consequently, the flags are displayed on the right shoulder with the stripes facing front, the reverse of the military style. Law enforcement officers often wear a small flag patch, either on a shoulder or above a shirt pocket.

Every U.S. astronaut since the crew of Gemini 4 has worn the flag on the left shoulder of their space suits, except for the crew of Apollo 1, whose flags were worn on the right shoulder. In this case, the canton was on the left.

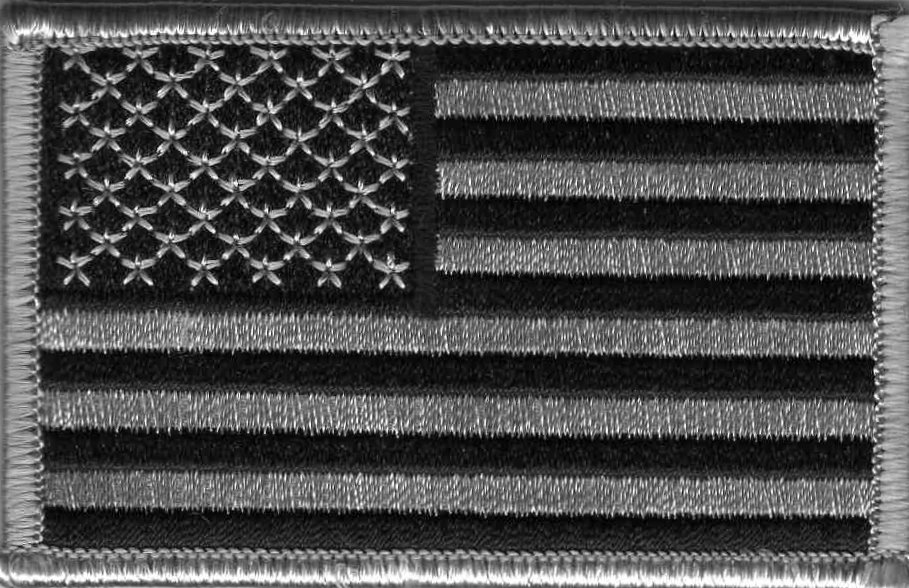
A subdued-color flag patch, similar to the style worn on the United States Army's ACU uniform. The patch is customarily worn reversed on the right upper sleeve.

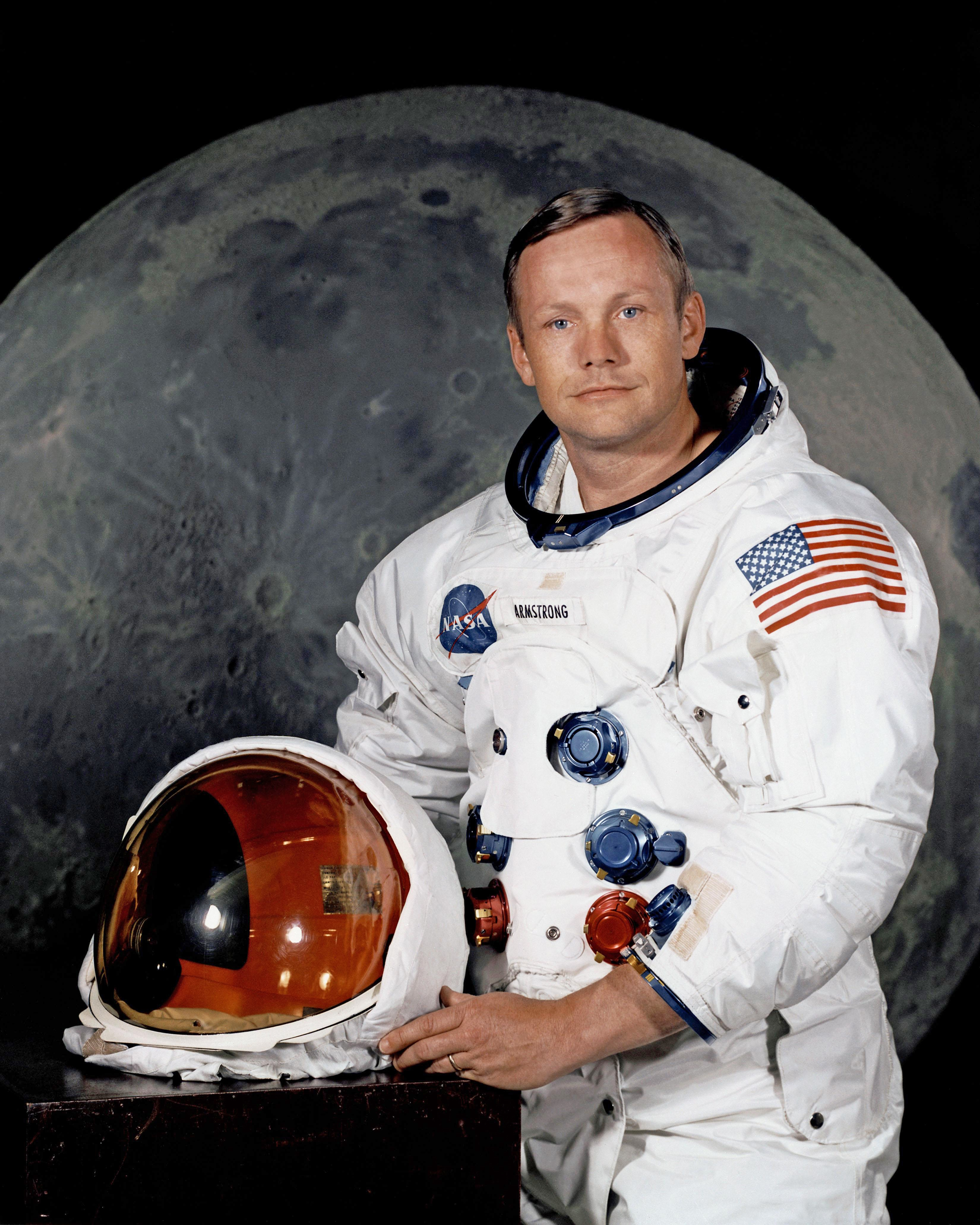
Flag of the United States on American astronaut Neil Armstrong's space suit

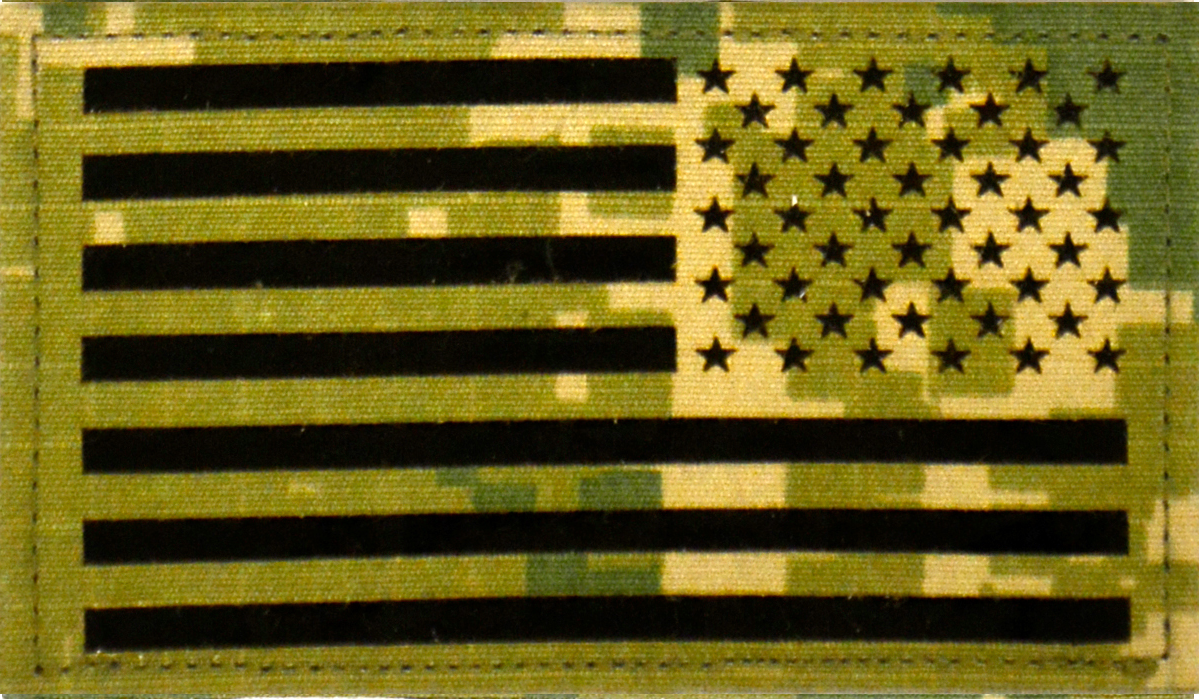
Patch with the union to the front, as seen on a Navy uniform

=== Postage stamps ===
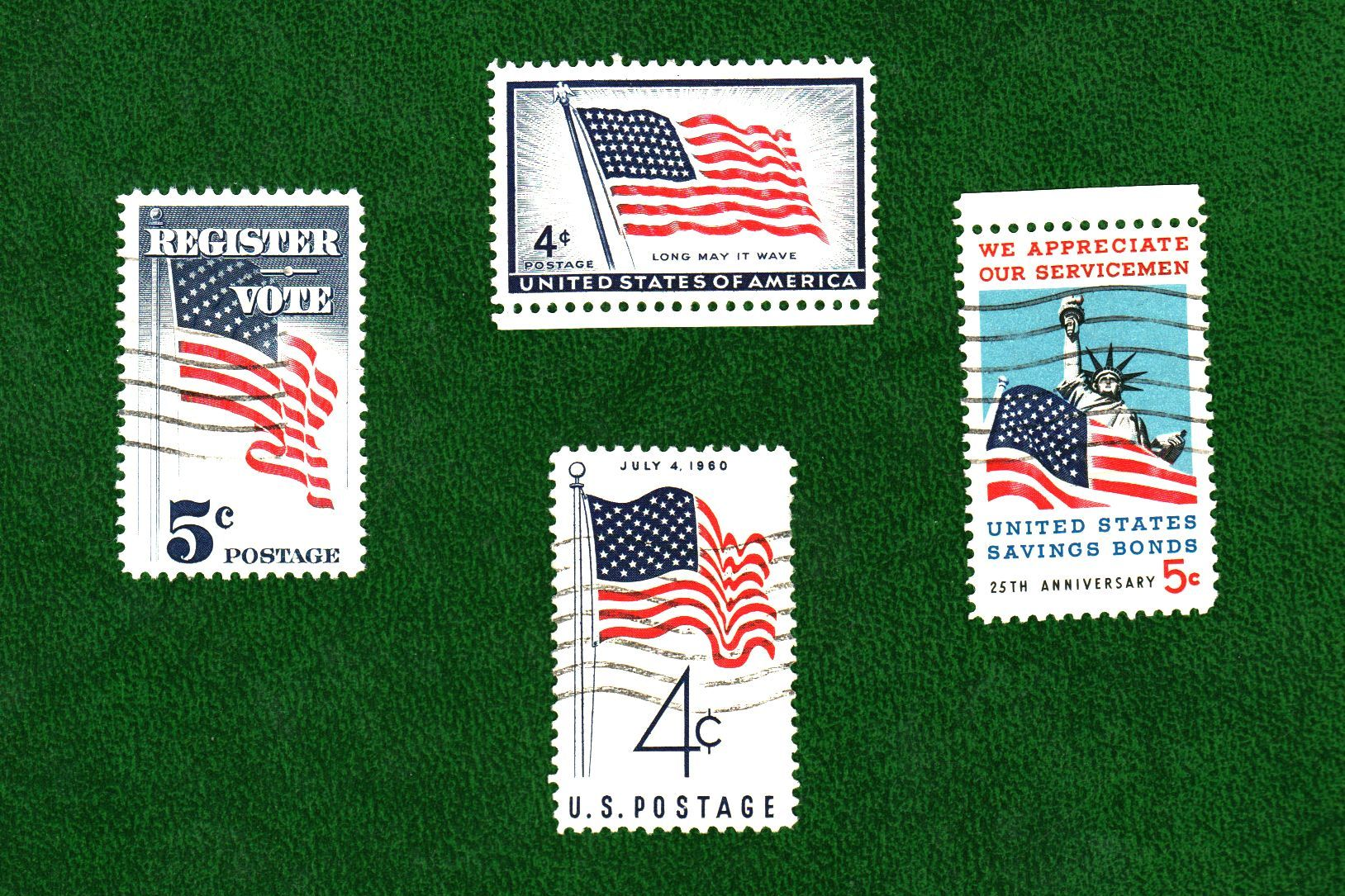
Flags depicted on U.S. postage stamp issues

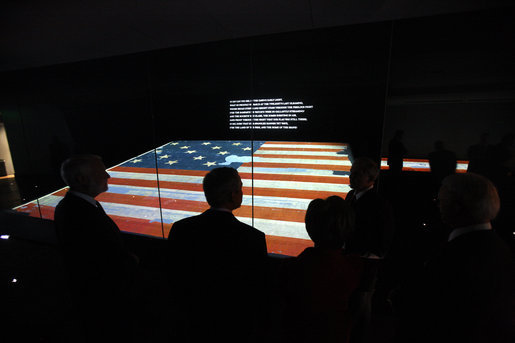
Image of the Star-Spangled Banner flag in the National Museum of American History, being observed by George W. Bush

The flag did not appear on U.S. postal stamp issues until the Battle of White Plains Issue was released in 1926, depicting the flag with a circle of 13 stars. The 48-star flag first appeared on the General Casimir Pulaski issue of 1931, though in a small monochrome depiction. The first U.S. postage stamp to feature the flag as the sole subject was issued July 4, 1957, Scott catalog number 1094. Since then, the flag has frequently appeared on U.S. stamps.

=== Display in museums ===
In 1907, Eben Appleton, New York stockbroker and grandson of Lieutenant Colonel George Armistead (the commander of Fort McHenry during the 1814 bombardment), loaned the Star-Spangled Banner Flag to the Smithsonian Institution. In 1912 he converted the loan into a gift. Appleton donated the flag with the wish that it would always be on view to the public. In 1994, the National Museum of American History determined that the Star-Spangled Banner Flag required further conservation treatment to remain on public display. In 1998 teams of museum conservators, curators, and other specialists helped move the flag from its home in the Museum's Flag Hall into a new conservation laboratory. Following the reopening of the National Museum of American History on November 21, 2008, the flag is now on display in a special exhibition, "The Star-Spangled Banner: The Flag That Inspired the National Anthem," where it rests at a 10-degree angle in dim light for conservation purposes.

=== Places of continuous display ===
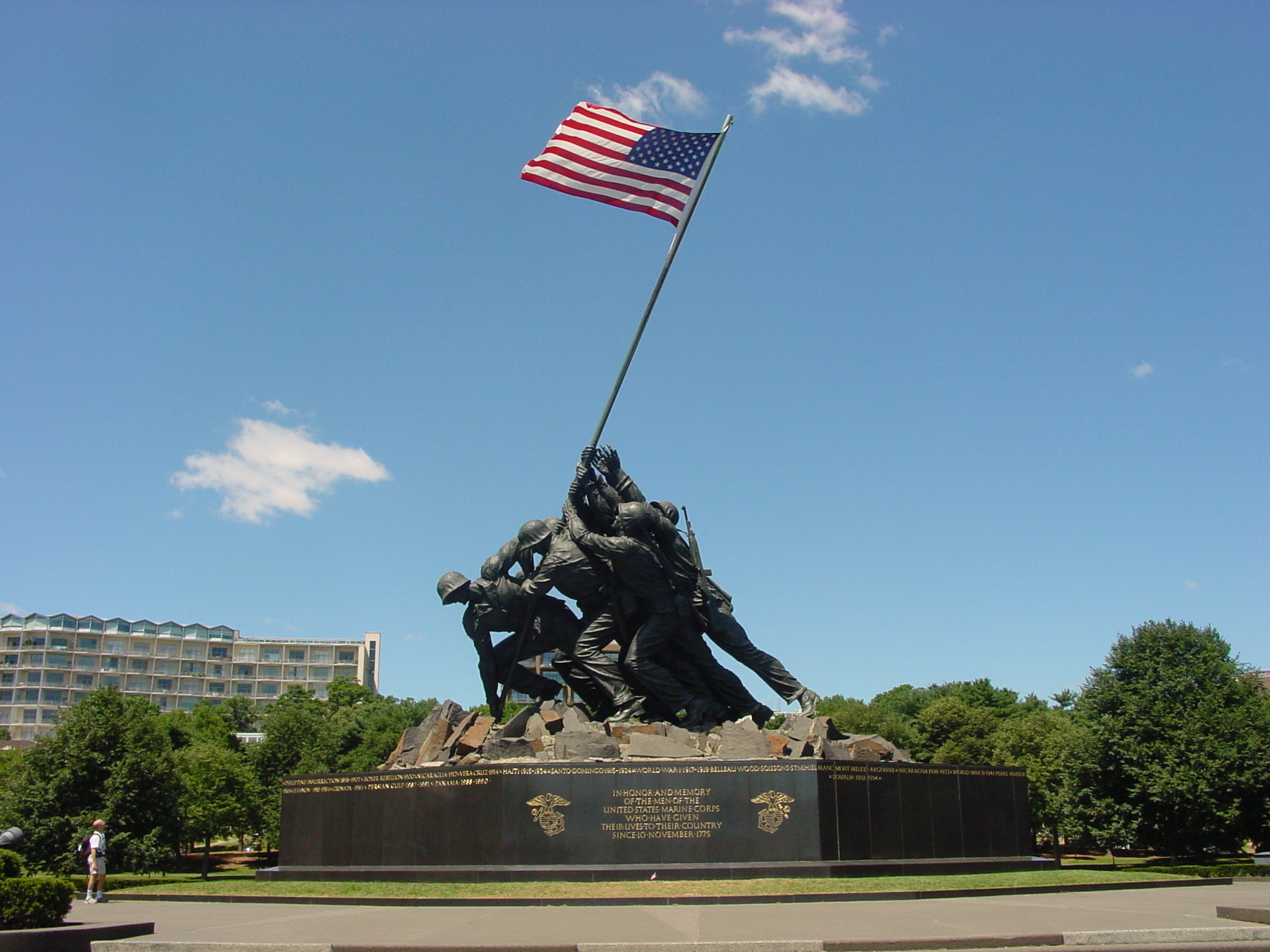
Marine Corps War Memorial, Arlington, Virginia

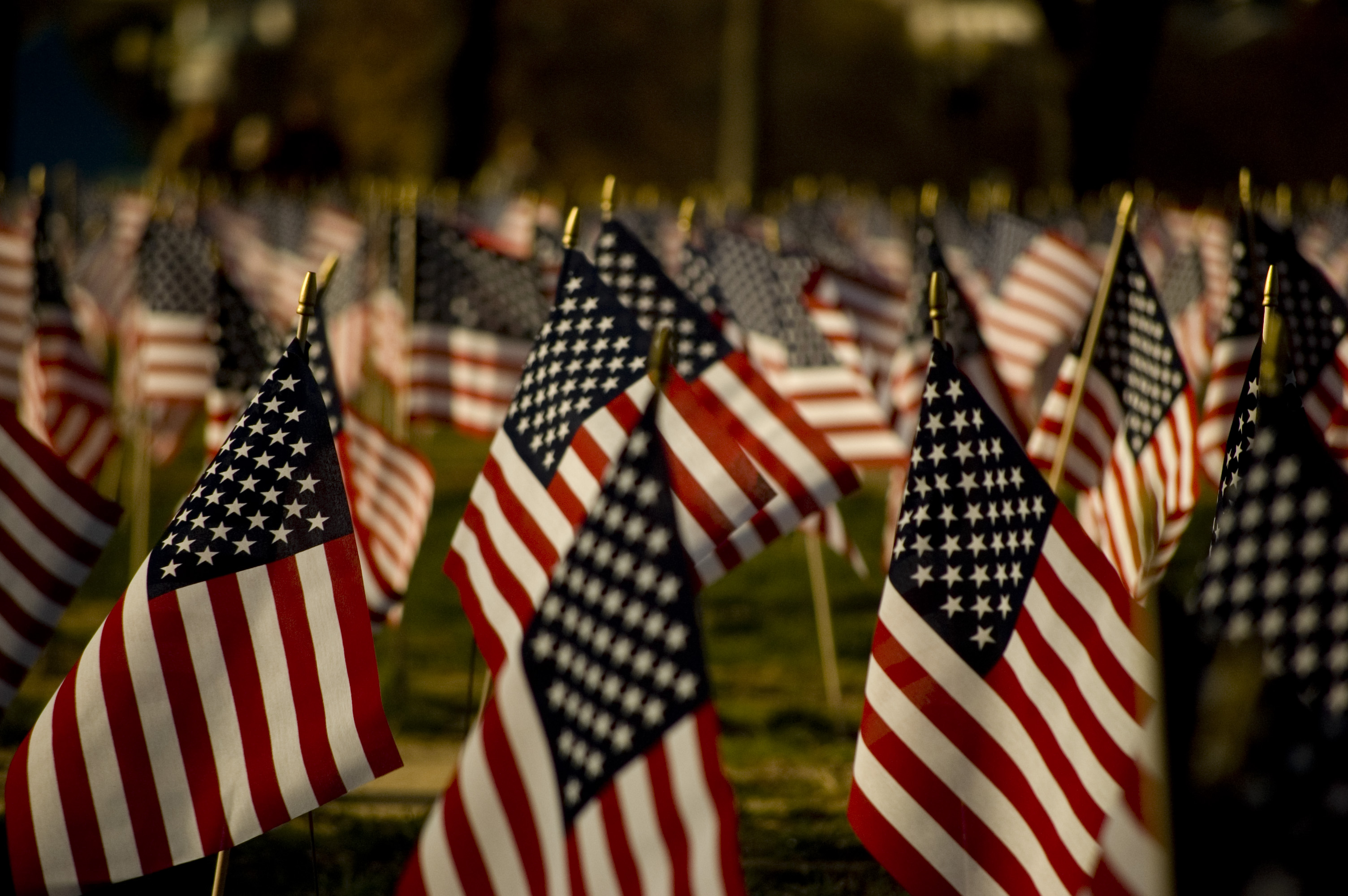
Flags covering the National Mall

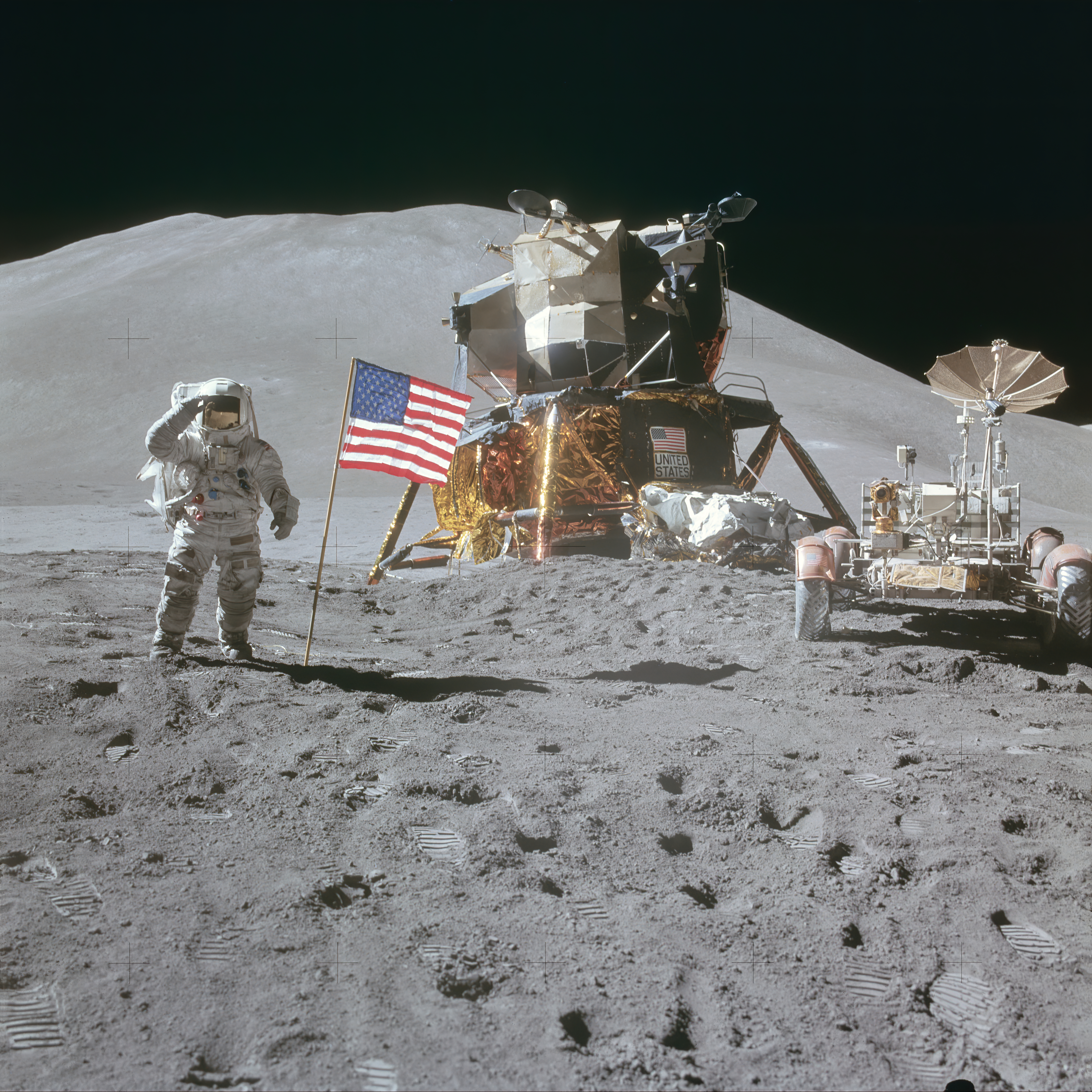
Astronaut James Irwin salutes the flag during the 1971 Apollo 15 lunar mission.

U.S. flags are displayed continuously at certain locations by presidential proclamation, acts of Congress, and custom.

- Replicas of the Star-Spangled Banner Flag (15 stars, 15 stripes) are flown at two sites in Baltimore, Maryland: Fort McHenry National Monument and Historic Shrine and Flag House Square.
- Marine Corps War Memorial (Raising the Flag on Iwo Jima), Arlington, Virginia.
- The Battle Green in Lexington, Massachusetts, site of the first shots fired in the Revolution
- The White House, Washington, D.C.
- Fifty U.S. flags are displayed continuously at the Washington Monument, Washington, D.C.
- At continuously open U.S. Customs and Border Protection Ports of Entry.
- A Civil War era flag (for the year 1863) flies above Pennsylvania Hall (Old Dorm) at Gettysburg College. This building, occupied by both sides at various points of the Battle of Gettysburg, served as a lookout and battlefield hospital.
- Grounds of the National Memorial Arch in Valley Forge NHP, Valley Forge, Pennsylvania
- By custom, at the Maryland home, birthplace, and grave of Francis Scott Key; at the Worcester, Massachusetts war memorial; at the plaza in Taos, New Mexico (since 1861); at the United States Capitol (since 1918); and at Mount Moriah Cemetery in Deadwood, South Dakota.
- Newark Liberty International Airport's Terminal A, Gate 17 (2001–2021) and Boston Logan Airport's Terminal B, Gate 32, and Terminal C, Gate 19 in memoriam of the events of September 11, 2001.
- Slover Mountain (Colton Liberty Flag), in Colton, California. July 4, 1917, to c. 1952 & 1997 to 2012.
- At the ceremonial South Pole as one of the 12 flags representing the signatory countries of the original Antarctic Treaty.
- On the Moon: six crewed missions successfully landed at various locations and each had a flag raised at the site. Exhaust gases when the Ascent Stage launched to return the astronauts to their Command Module Columbia for return to Earth blew over the flag the Apollo 11 mission had placed.

=== Particular days for display ===
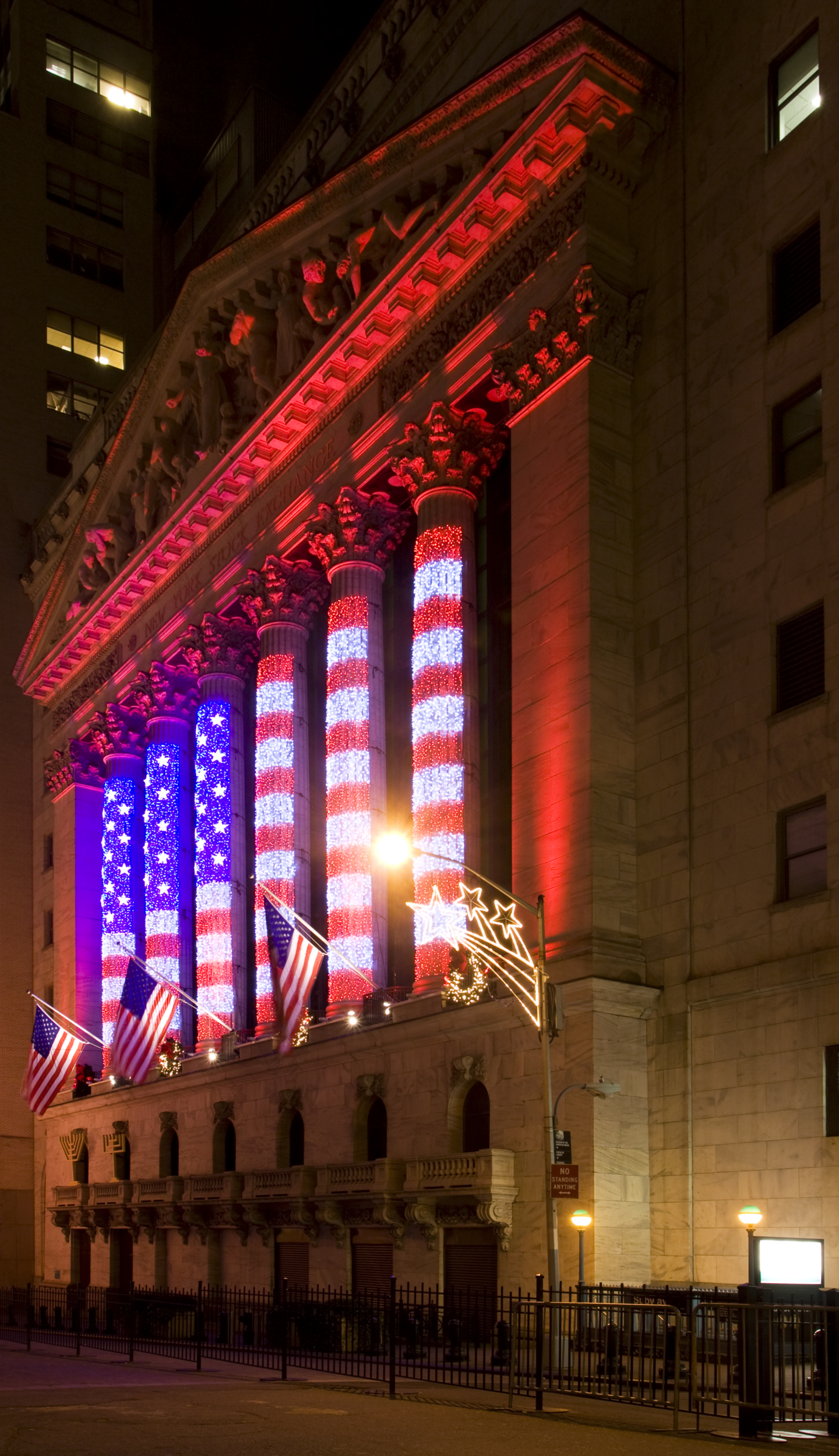
The New York Stock Exchange at Christmas time

The flag should especially be displayed on the following days:

- January: 1 (New Year's Day), third Monday of the month (Martin Luther King Jr. Day), and 20 (Inauguration Day, once every four years, which, by tradition, is postponed to the 21st if the 20th falls on a Sunday)
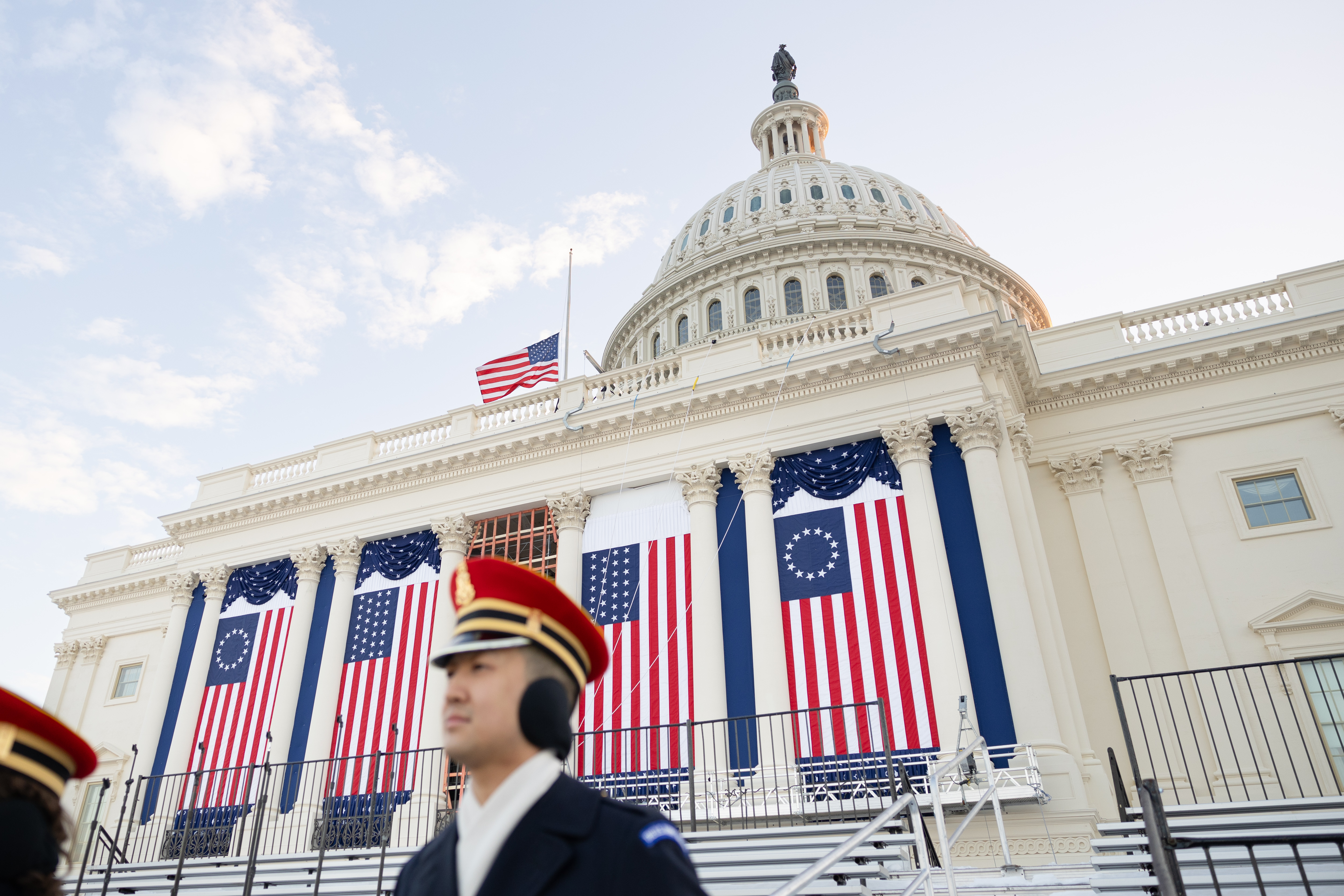
  Flag decorations at the Capitol as being prepared for Trump's inauguration in 2025, featuring a pair of Betsy Ross flags alongside a pair of 27-star flags – representing the President's home state of Florida when it was admitted to the Union as the 27th state. The main flag on the flagpole was noticeably displayed at half-staff in honor of Jimmy Carter.
- February: 12 (Lincoln's birthday) and the third Monday (legally known as Washington's Birthday but more often called Presidents' Day)
- March–April: Easter Sunday (date varies)
- May: Second Sunday (Mother's Day), third Saturday (Armed Forces Day), and last Monday (Memorial Day; half-staff until noon)
- June: 14 (Flag Day), third Sunday (Father's Day)
- July: 4 (Independence Day)
- September: First Monday (Labor Day), 17 (Constitution Day and Citizenship Day), and last Sunday (Gold Star Mother's Day)
- October: Second Monday (Columbus Day) and 27 (Navy Day)
- November: 11 (Veterans Day) and fourth Thursday (Thanksgiving Day)
- December: 25 (Christmas Day)
- and such other days as may be proclaimed by the president of the United States; the birthdays of states (date of admission); and on state holidays.

=== Display at half-staff ===
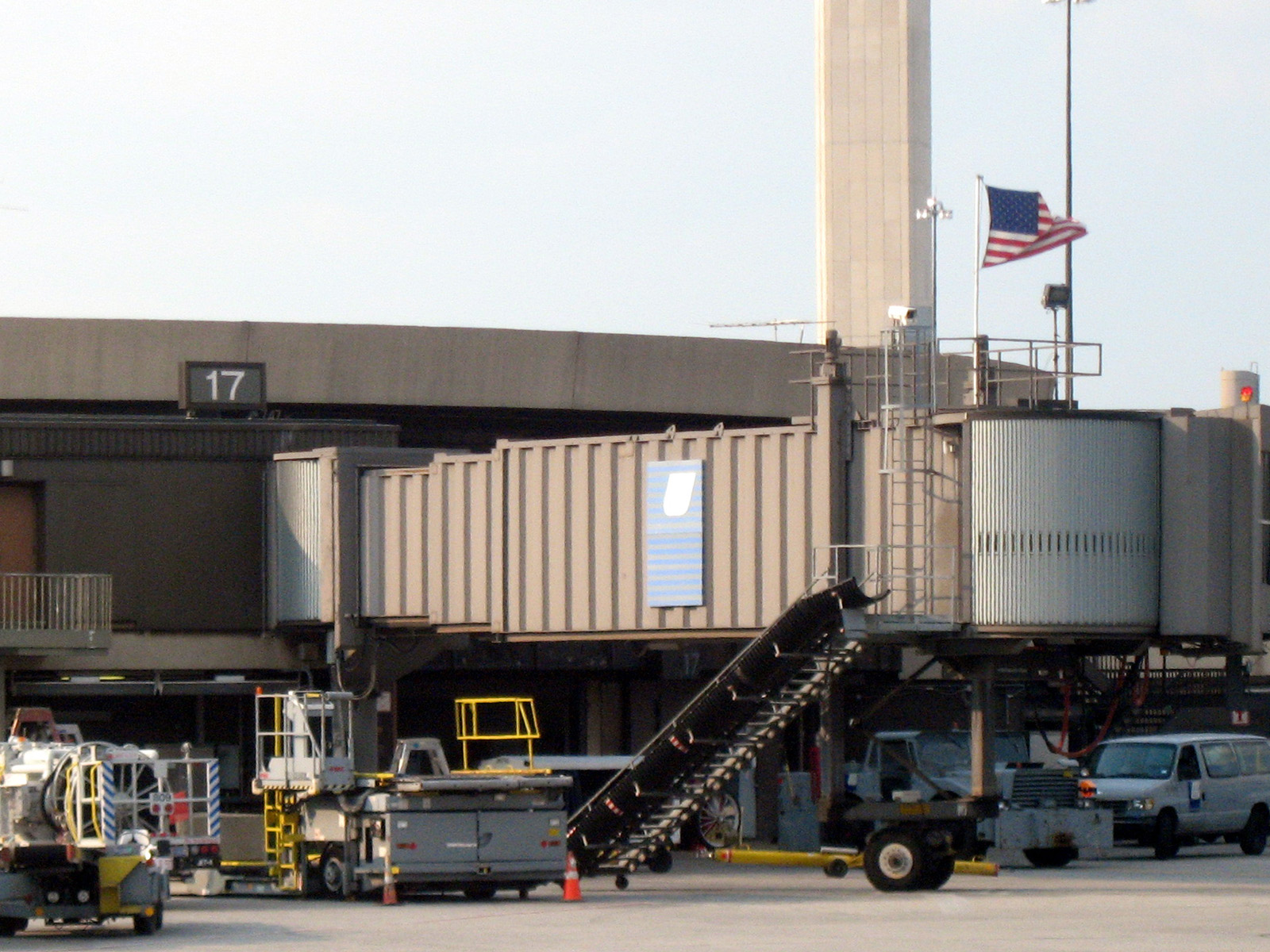
An American flag now flies at half-staff over Gate 17 of Terminal A at Newark Liberty International Airport in Newark, New Jersey, departure gate of United Airlines Flight 93 on 9/11.

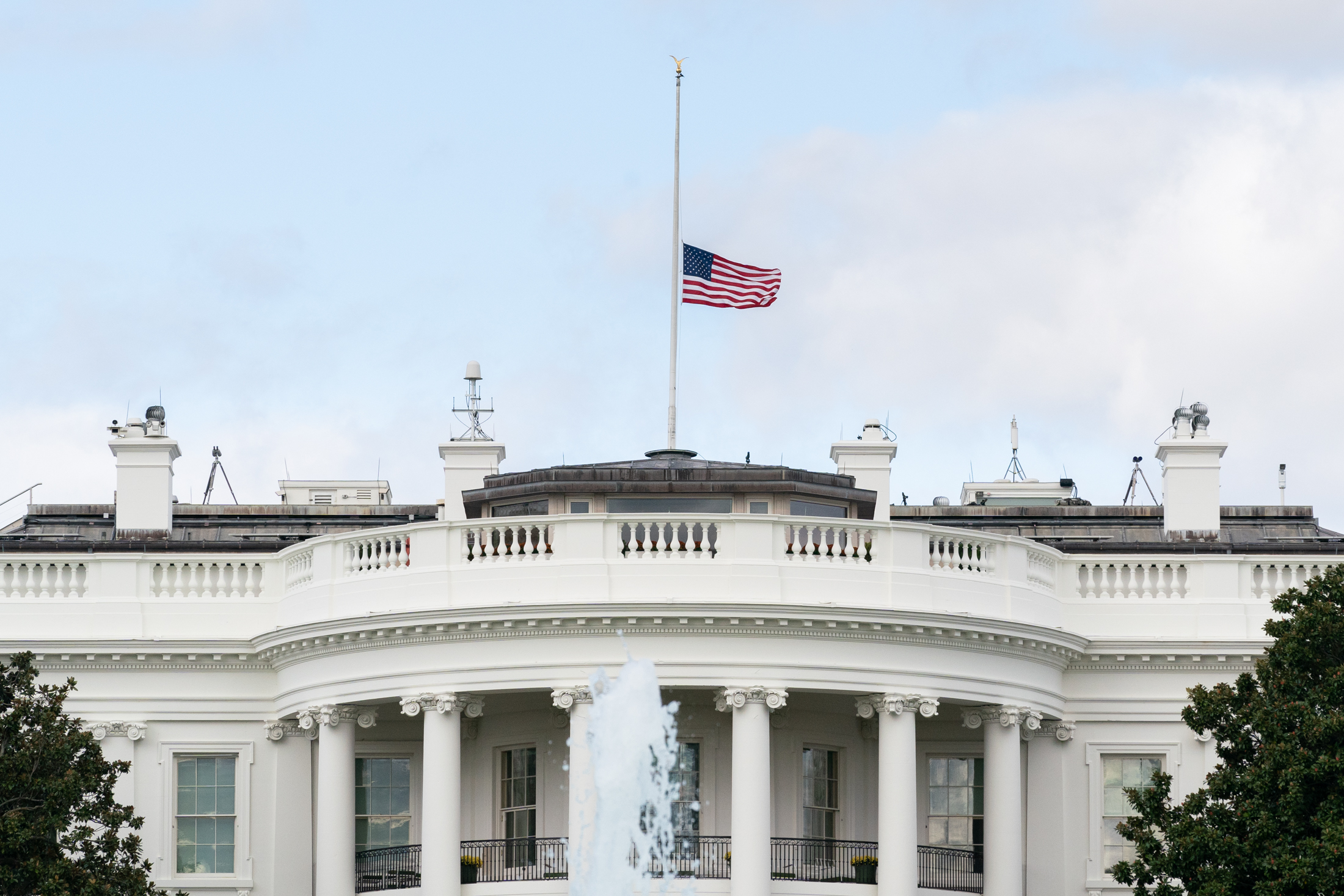
The flag at half-staff on the White House.

The flag is displayed at half-staff (half-mast in naval usage) as a sign of respect or mourning. Nationwide, this action is proclaimed by the president; statewide or territory-wide, the proclamation is made by the governor. In addition, there is no prohibition against municipal governments, private businesses, or citizens flying the flag at half-staff as a local sign of respect and mourning. However, many flag enthusiasts feel this type of practice has somewhat diminished the meaning of the original intent of lowering the flag to honor those who held high positions in federal or state offices. President Dwight D. Eisenhower issued the first proclamation on March 1, 1954, standardizing the dates and periods for flying the flag at half-staff from all federal buildings, grounds, and naval vessels; other congressional resolutions and presidential proclamations ensued. However, they are only guidelines to all other entities: typically followed at state and local government facilities and encouraged of private businesses and citizens.

To properly fly the flag at half-staff, one should first briefly hoist it top of the staff, then lower it to the half-staff position, halfway between the top and bottom of the staff. Similarly, when the flag is to be lowered from half-staff, it should be first briefly hoisted to the top of the staff.

Federal statutes provide that the flag should be flown at half-staff on the following dates:

- May 15: Peace Officers Memorial Day (unless it is the third Saturday in May, Armed Forces Day, then full-staff)
- Last Monday in May: Memorial Day (until noon)
- September 11: Patriot Day
- First Sunday in October: Start of Fire Prevention Week, in honor of the National Fallen Firefighters Memorial Service.
- December 7: National Pearl Harbor Remembrance Day
- For 30 days: Death of a president or former president
- For 10 days: Death of a vice president, Supreme Court chief justice/retired chief justice, or speaker of the House of Representatives.
- From death until the day of interment: Supreme Court associate justice, member of the Cabinet, former vice president, president pro tempore of the Senate, or the majority and minority leaders of the Senate and House of Representatives. Also, for federal facilities within a state or territory, for the governor.
- On the day after the death: Members of Congress, territorial delegates, or the resident commissioner of the Commonwealth of Puerto Rico

=== Desecration ===
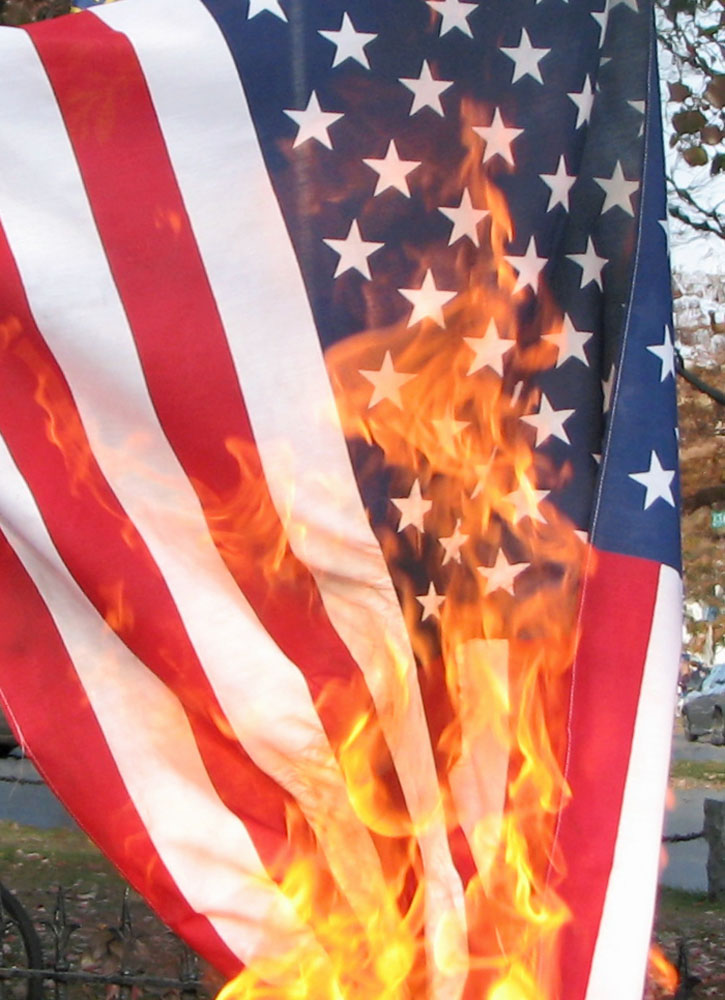
U.S. flag being burned in protest on the eve of the 2008 election

The flag of the United States is sometimes burned as a cultural or political statement, in protest of the policies of the U.S. government, or for other reasons, both within the U.S. and abroad. The United States Supreme Court in Texas v. Johnson, 491 U.S. 397 (1989), and reaffirmed in U.S. v. Eichman, 496 U.S. 310 (1990), has ruled that due to the First Amendment to the United States Constitution, it is unconstitutional for a government (whether federal, state, or municipal) to prohibit the desecration of a flag, due to its status as "symbolic speech". However, content-neutral restrictions may still be imposed to regulate the time, place, and manner of such expression. If the flag that was burned was someone else's property (as it was in the Johnson case, since Johnson had stolen the flag from a Texas bank's flagpole), the offender could be charged with petty larceny, or with destruction of private property, or possibly both.

=== Flying a U.S. flag upside down ===
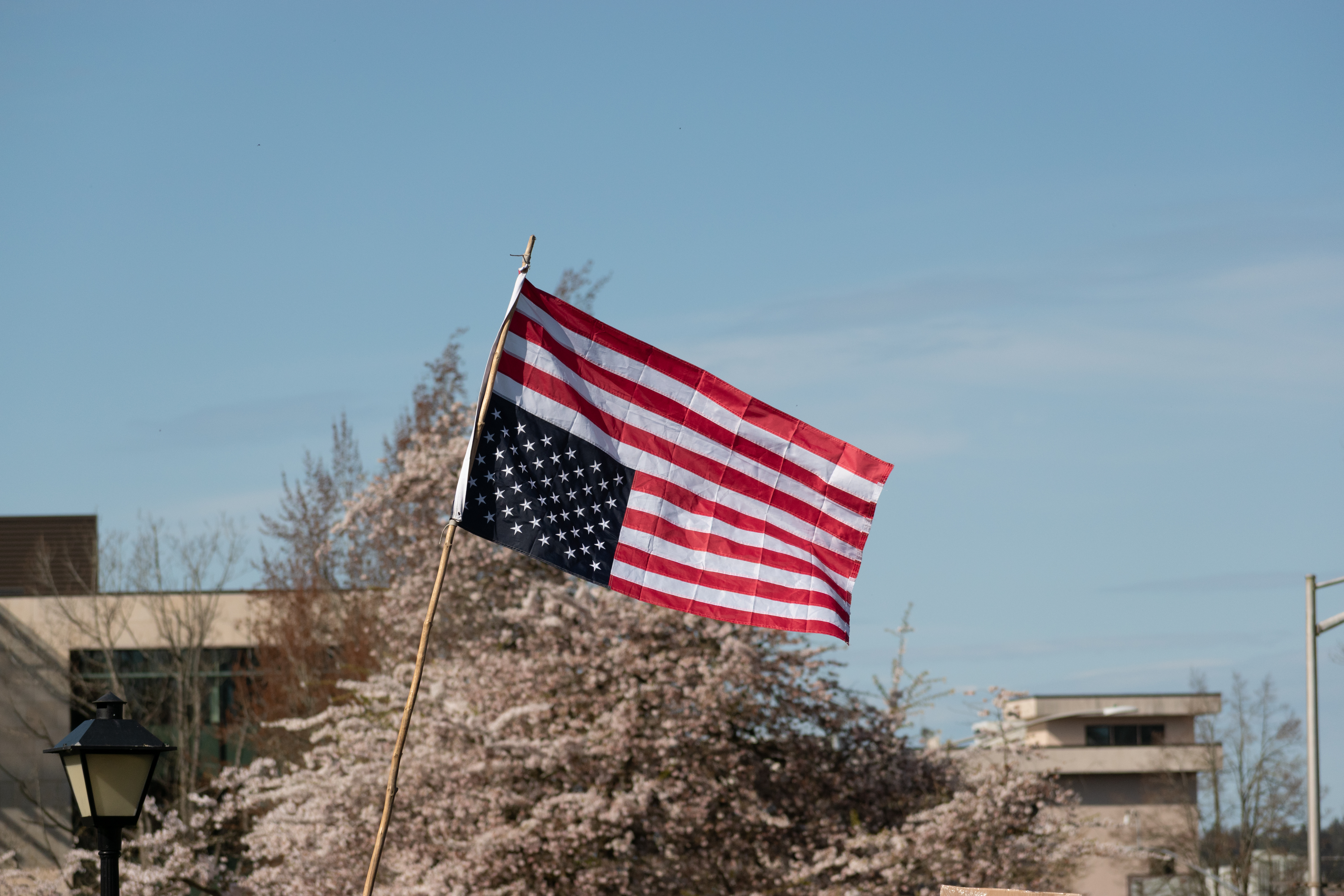
An upside down U.S. flag at a protest in Olympia, Washington

The original meaning of displaying a U.S. flag upside down is "a signal of dire distress in instances of extreme danger to life or property."

More recently, it has been used by extension to make a statement about distress in civic, political, or other areas. It is most often meant as political protest, and is usually interpreted as such. The musical group Rage Against the Machine, a group known for songs expressing revolutionary political views, displayed two upside-down American flags from their amplifiers on the April 13, 1996, episode of Saturday Night Live. This was intended to indicate protest about the host, billionaire businessman Steve Forbes. The flags were ripped down by stagehands about 20 seconds before the group's performance of "Bulls on Parade". Afterward, show officials asked band members to leave the building as they were waiting in their dressing room to perform "Bullet in the Head" later in the show.

Flying flags upside down has been used as a sign of protest against U.S. presidents.

In 2020, as protests spread across the U.S. demanding an end to police brutality, some U.S. citizens chose to fly their flags upside down as part of the protests.

In 2020–21, some individuals in the "Stop the Steal" movement flew upside down flags to protest the 2020 presidential election amid claims it was rigged against Donald Trump. Such a flag was flown at the home of Supreme Court justice Samuel Alito in 2021. The upside-down flag was frequently flown in response to Trump's conviction of 34 felonies by his right-wing supporters.

On February 22, 2025, a giant upside-down flag was displayed in Yosemite park by staff recently fired by the Trump administration. Rallies held on March 1, 2025, also saw upside-down flags displayed in iconic spots during a day of action in numerous national parks opposing reductions in staff and protections for public lands.

== Folding for storage ==
Folding the U.S. flag

Though not part of the official Flag Code, according to military custom, flags should be folded into a triangular shape when not in use. To properly fold the flag:

1. Begin by holding it waist-high with another person so that its surface is parallel to the ground.
2. Fold the lower half of the stripe section lengthwise over the field of stars, holding the bottom and top edges securely.
3. Fold the flag again lengthwise with the blue field on the outside.
4. Make a rectangular fold then a triangular fold by bringing the striped corner of the folded edge to meet the open top edge of the flag, starting the fold from the left side over to the right.
5. Turn the outer end point inward, parallel to the open edge, to form a second triangle.
6. The triangular folding is continued until the entire length of the flag is folded in this manner (usually thirteen triangular folds, as shown at right). On the final fold, any remnant that does not neatly fold into a triangle (or in the case of exactly even folds, the last triangle) is tucked into the previous fold.
7. When the flag is completely folded, only a triangular blue field of stars should be visible.

There is also no specific meaning for each fold of the flag. However, there are scripts read by non-government organizations and also by the Air Force that are used during the flag folding ceremony. These scripts range from historical timelines of the flag to religious themes.

== Use in funerals ==
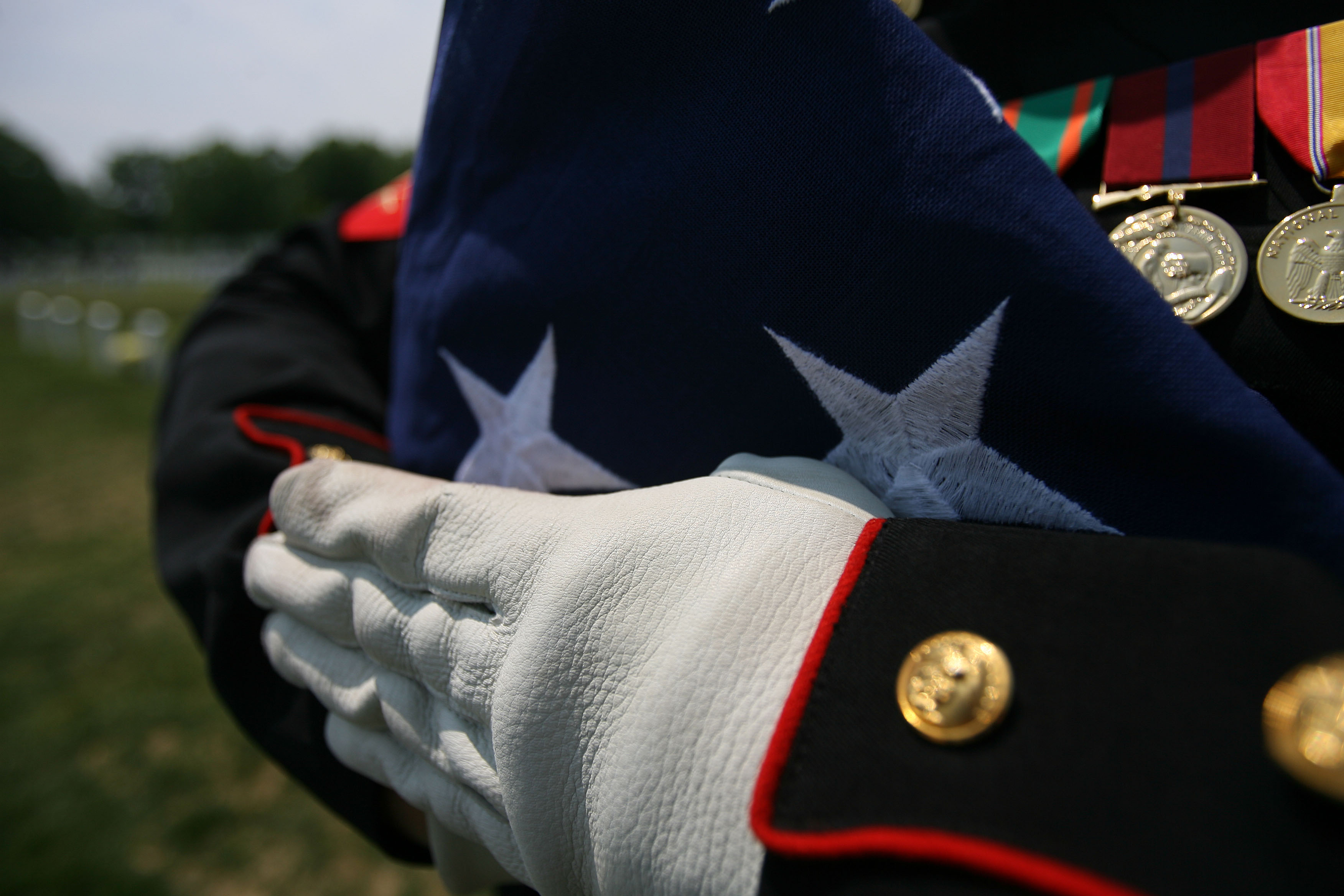
A flag prepared for presentation to the next of kin

Traditionally, the flag of the United States plays a role in military funerals, and occasionally in funerals of other civil servants (such as law enforcement officers, fire fighters, and U.S. presidents). A burial flag is draped over the deceased's casket as a pall during services. Just prior to the casket being lowered into the ground, the flag is ceremonially folded and presented to the deceased's next of kin as a token of respect.

== Surviving historical flags ==
This is a list of surviving flags that have been displayed at or otherwise associated with notable historical battles or events.

=== Revolutionary War ===
- Forster Flag (1775) – Historians believe the Manchester Company of the First Essex County Militia Regiment carried this flag during the battles of Lexington and Concord on April 19, 1775. The militia unit was activated but was not involved in the day's fighting. This flag is historic because it is the oldest surviving flag depicting the 13 colonies. This flag may have been a British ensign flag that had its Union Jack removed and replaced with 13 white stripes before or after the battles of Lexington and Concord. The slight variation in the canton area suggests something else might have been sewn into place before. The flag gets its name from Samuel Forster, a First Lieutenant in the Manchester Company. He took possession of the flag, and his descendants passed it down until donating it to the American Flag Heritage Foundation in 1975, two hundred years later. In April 2014, the foundation sold the flag at auction.
- Westmoreland Flag (1775?) – Flag used by the 1st Battalion of Westmoreland County, Pennsylvania. In 1774 the town of Hanna, the county seat of Westmoreland County, began preparations for a conflict with the mother country as tensions between the two sides began to heat up. The town decided in May 1775, following the battles of Lexington and Concord, to create two battalions. The town sheriff, John Proctor, would have command over the 1st, and the unit would see action at Trenton and Princeton. Due to the flag's remarkable condition, it is speculated that it never flew in many battles, if at all. The flag is said to have been made in the fall of 1775 from a standard British red ensign. This flag is one of two surviving revolutionary flags that feature a coiled rattlesnake, along with the flag of the United Company of the Train of Artillery. After the war in 1810, Alexander Craig, a captain in the 2nd battalion, was given the flag. It would stay with the Craig family until donated to the Pennsylvania State Library in 1914.
- Brandywine flag (1777) – This flag is stated in most research as being the flag of the 7th Pennsylvania Regiment. However, the Independence National Historical Park, which currently owns the flag, states it is the flag of the Chester County Militia. The flags gets its name for being used at the Battle of Brandywine which took place on September 11, 1777, less than three months after the passage of the first flag act making it one of the earliest stars and stripes.
- Dansey Flag (1777) – Flag used by a Delaware militia early in the war. Before the Battle of Brandywine, a soldier with the British 33rd Regiment of foote named William Dansey captured the militia's flag during a skirmish in Newark, Delaware. Dansey would take the flag back to England as a war trophy. It would remain in his family until 1927, after being auctioned off to the Delaware Historical Society. This flag would have been one of the earliest to use 13 stripes to represent the united colonies. Another interesting note about this flag is that it was most likely a Division color instead of being used by one militia regiment.
- First Pennsylvania Rifles Flag (1776?) – Battle colors for the First Pennsylvania Regiment This regiment, also known as the First Pennsylvania Rifles, was formed in 1775 following an act passed by the Continental Congress calling for ten companies of marksmen. The regiment would participate in many significant battles during the Revolution, such as the siege of Boston, Trenton, Princeton, Brandywine, and Monmouth. They would be dissolved in November 1783 following the treaty of Paris. The earliest mention of this flag was mentioned in a 1776 letter by one of its soldiers. The flag would be with the unit until the end of the war.
- Third New York Regiment Flag (1779) – The Third New York was formed in 1775 on five-month enlistments that expired later that year. In 1776 however, the regiment would be re-established twice, once in January and the other in December. During the war, the Third New York saw action in Canada, White Plains, and New York, during which it participated in the defense of Fort Stanwix. In 1780 the soldiers of the third were transferred over to the 1st New York Regiment. While not the most famous of regiments in turns of battles fought, it does leave behind a legacy that can be seen in the flag of New York. In 1778 New York adopted a coat of arms for the state. The following year, the regiment's colonel Peter Gansevoort gifted the unit a blue regimental flag bearing the newly adopted arms. This flag would serve as the basis of the current flag of New York.

=== War of 1812 ===
- Star Spangled Banner Flag (1814) – Flag that flew over Fort McHenry during a British bombardment in the War of 1812. This flag is depicted by Francis Scott Key in the song "Star-Spangled Banner" which would later become the national anthem of the United States. Details : 30 x 34 ft. (Currently) 15 horizontal stripes alternating red and white stripes 14 stars (one missing) Stars arranged in a staggered 3-3-3-3-3 pattern

=== Antebellum Period ===
- Fillmore Flag – A historic Bennington flag currently maintained by the Bennington Museum, held to be an heirloom from president Millard Fillmore's family. Though it is sometimes taken to be an authentic artifact of the Battle of Bennington, curators date it no earlier than the 19th century based on its construction. The Bennington Museum estimates it was made sometime between 1812 and 1820, though one estimate places it as late as 1876.
- Old Glory Flag – This flag was the first American Flag to be given the name "Old Glory". The flag was made in 1824 and was a gift to William Driver, a sea captain, by his mother. He named the flag 'Old Glory' and took it with him during his time at sea. In 1861 the flag's original stars were replaced with 34 new ones, and an anchor was added to the corner of the canton. During the Civil war, Driver hid his flag until Nashville became under union hands, to which he flew the flag above the Tennessee capitol building.
- Matthew Perry Expedition Flag (1853) – On July 14, 1853, this flag was raised over Uraga, Japan, during the Perry Expedition, in doing so it became the first American Flag to officially fly in mainland Japan. In 1855 it was presented to the US Naval Academy. In 1913 it received a linen backing during preservation treatments by Amelia Fowler, who would also work on restoring the Star-Spangled Banner. Nearly a century after its historic voyage to Japan, in 1945, the flag once again returned and was present at the formal surrender of Japan on board the USS Missouri on September 2, 1945. Owing to its condition, it had to be presented on its reverse side. As of 2021, the U.S. Naval Academy possesses the flag.

=== Civil War ===
- Fort Sumter Flag (1861) – During the bombardment of Fort Sumter in April 1861, the flagpole was hit by artillery fire. The flag was raised again from a makeshift pole and was taken down after the Union garrison surrendered. The terms of surrender allowed the U.S. artillery to fire a salute for the flag. The flag was taken by the departing commander of the fort and was displayed to the public on a tour of the northern states. From this point, private citizens' display of the United States flag became much more common. Four years after the flag was lowered at Fort Sumter, it flew over the fort again on April 14, 1865, following the Confederate surrender. Later that day, Abraham Lincoln was assassinated.
- Abraham Lincoln Assassination Flag (1865) – Flag that was placed under the head of President Abraham Lincoln following his fatal shooting while he was still in the presidential box.

=== Reconstruction ===
- Little Big Horn Guidon – Guidon used by the 7th U.S. Cavalry during the Battle of Little Big Horn in 1876. The battle is infamous, for all U.S. cavalry troops engaged in battle were killed, including Lt. Col George A. Custer. Sgt. Ferdinand Culbertson discovered this flag under the body of one of the slain soldiers. In 2010, this flag was sold for $2.2 million.

=== World War II ===
- Iwo Jima Flag (1945) – American flag that was raised above Mount Suribachi during the Battle of Iwo Jima in WWII. The photo of this flag being raised by U.S. Marines was captured in the 1945 Pulitzer Prize-winning photo Raising the Flag on Iwo Jima.

=== Cold War ===
- Freedom 7 Flag (1961) – This American Flag flew on the Freedom 7 mission to space, becoming the first American flag to leave the Earth's atmosphere. The flag was a last-minute addition after a local student council president asked a reporter if this flag could be taken on board. The reporter took it to the head of the NASA space task group, to which he agreed. In 1995, the flag was again taken to space to commemorate the 100th American crewed space mission.

=== Modern day ===
- 9/11 Flag (2001) – Flag is believed to have been from a yacht called Star of America owned by Shirley Dreifus and her late husband Spiros E. Kopelakis. The yacht and its flag were docked in the Hudson River on the morning of 9/11. The flag was later found by three members of the New York Fire Department, George Johnson, Billy Eisengrein, and Dan McWilliams, who raised it over the rubble on a tilted flag pole (thought to be from the grounds of the Marriot hotel). This was captured in a photograph taken by Thomas Franklin, who worked for the New Jersey–based newspaper The Record. The photograph soon made its way to the Associated Press, and from there, it became shown worldwide on many newspapers' front pages. The photo has been compared to Joe Rosenthal's WWII "Raising the Flag on Iwo Jima". Lori Ginker and Ricky Flores captured other photos of the same event from different angles. Shortly after the famous photograph was taken, the flag disappeared. Another flag, thought to be the real one, was toured around the country, but it was later found that the size of this flag was not the same as the one in the photograph. The one in the photo was 3x5, while the one the city possessed was larger. The flag would remain missing for nearly 15 years until a man named Brian turned an American flag into a fire station along with its halyard. Investigators determined that his flag was genuine after comparing dust samples and event photographs. Today the 9/11 Memorial Museum possesses the flag.

== Related flags ==
The U.S. flag has inspired many other flags for regions, political movements, and cultural groups, resulting in a stars and stripes flag family. The other national flags belonging to this family are those of Chile, Cuba, Greece, Liberia, Malaysia, Togo, and Uruguay.

- Several flags of U.S. states and territories take elements from the American flag. Stars, stripes, and red, white, blue colors are common among U.S. state and territory flags.
- The Confederate States of America used a variety of flags inspired by the American flag. These flags were widely criticized for causing confusion on the battlefield, calling in favor of flags based on the battle flag.
- The flag of Bikini Atoll is symbolic of the islanders' belief that a great debt is still owed to the people of Bikini due to the United States government detonating a thermonuclear bomb on the island as part of the Castle Bravo test in 1954.
- The Republic of the United States of Brazil briefly used a flag inspired by the U.S. flag between November 15 and 19, 1889, proposed by the lawyer Ruy Barbosa. The flag had 13 green and yellow stripes, as well as a blue square with 21 white stars for the canton. The flag was vetoed by the then provisional president Marshal Deodoro da Fonseca citing concerns that it looked too similar to the American flag. Likewise, several Brazilian states have flags that are reminiscent of the 1889 Brazilian national flag.
- The colors on the flag of the Philippines were influenced in part by the United States flag.
- In 1901, Mark Twain wrote a satirical essay titled To the Person Sitting in Darkness, in which Twain sardonically suggested a flag for the American-controlled Philippines: "And as for a flag for the Philippine Province, it is easily managed. We can have a special one—our States do it: we can have just our usual flag, with the white stripes painted black and the stars replaced by the skull and cross-bones."
- The flag of Liberia bears a close resemblance, showing the origin of the country as having been founded by free people of color from North America, primarily the United States. The Liberian flag has 11 similar red and white stripes, which stand for the 11 signers of the Liberian Declaration of Independence, as well as a blue square canton with one large white star.
- Despite Malaysia having no historical connections with the U.S., the flag of Malaysia greatly resembles the U.S. flag. Some theories posit that the flag of the British East India Company influenced both the Malaysian and U.S. flag.
- The flag of El Salvador from 1865 to 1912 was based on the flag of the United States, with a field of alternating blue and white stripes and a red canton containing white stars.
- The flag of Brittany was inspired in part by the American flag.
- The flag of the Mountainous Republic of the Northern Caucasus, an unrecognized state that existed from 1917 to 1922, during the Russian Civil War, was divided into seven horizontal stripes that altered between green and white. In the top right corner was placed a blue canton with seven five-pointed yellow stars. This flag is the basis for the flag of Abkhazia.
- The flag of Ambazonia is the national flag of the unrecognized Ambazonia. It contains a circle of 13 stars, in the style of the Betsy Ross flag, as well as nine blue and white stripes.
First Navy Jack of the United States

United States yacht ensign

Stars and Bars flag of the Confederate States of America (1861–1863)

Flag of Liberia

Flag of Bikini Atoll

Flag of Brittany

Flag of Brazil (1889)

Flag of El Salvador (1875–1912)

Flag of the MRNC (1917–1922)

Flag of Malaysia

== Unicode ==
The flag of the United States is represented as the Unicode emoji sequence U+1F1FA 🇺 REGIONAL INDICATOR SYMBOL LETTER U and U+1F1F8 🇸 REGIONAL INDICATOR SYMBOL LETTER S, making "🇺🇸". Platforms also use the flag of the United States to represent the United States Minor Outlying Islands in the sequence U+1F1FA 🇺 REGIONAL INDICATOR SYMBOL LETTER U and U+1F1F2 🇲 REGIONAL INDICATOR SYMBOL LETTER M, making 🇺🇲.

== See also ==
- Ensign of the United States
- Flag Day
- Flags of the Confederate States of America
- Flags of the United States Armed Forces
- Flags of the U.S. states
- Flag Desecration Amendment
- Fort Sumter Flag
- List of flags of the United States
- Nationalism in the United States

=== Article sections ===
- Colors, standards and guidons § United States
- Flag desecration § United States

=== Associated people ===
- Robert Anderson (1805–1871), war hero who lowered the Fort Sumter Flag, which became a national symbol
- Francis Bellamy (1855–1931), creator of the Pledge of Allegiance
- Thomas E. Franklin (1966–present), photographer of Ground Zero Spirit, better known as Raising the Flag at Ground Zero
- Christopher Gadsden (1724–1805), after whom the Gadsden flag is named
- Francis Hopkinson (1737–1791), designed the U.S. flag in 1777
- Jasper Johns (born 1930), painter of Flag (1954–55), inspired by a dream of the flag
- George Preble (1816–1885), author of History of the American Flag (1872) and photographer of the Fort McHenry flag
- Joe Rosenthal (1911–2006), photographer of Raising the Flag on Iwo Jima
- Betsy Ross (1752–1836), said to have sewn the first U.S. flag in a popular legend, and after whom the Betsy Ross flag is named
