= Gregory Lee Johnson =

American activist (born 1956)

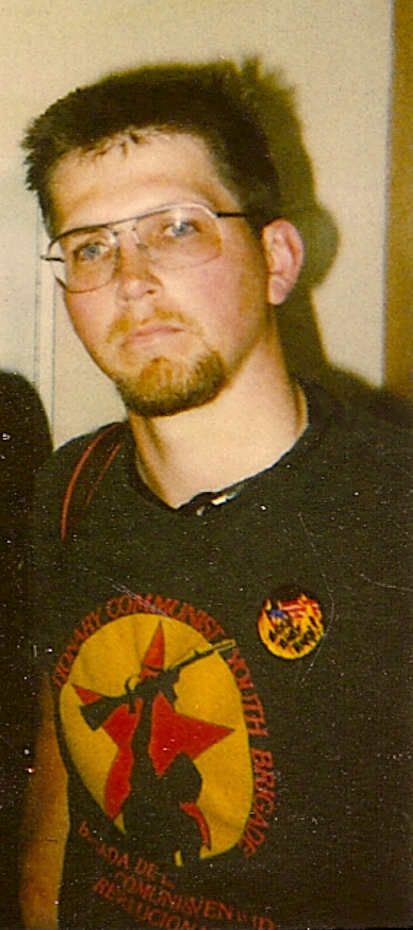
- Johnson c. 1989
- Born: 1956 (age 69–70); Richmond, Indiana, U.S.
- Other name: Joey
- Occupation: Activist
- Known for: Defendant in Texas v. Johnson (1989)
- Political party: Revolutionary Communist Party, USA

Gregory Lee "Joey" Johnson (born 1956) is an American political activist, known for his advocacy of flag desecration. His burning of the flag of the United States in a political demonstration during the 1984 Republican National Convention in Dallas, Texas, led to his role as defendant in the landmark United States Supreme Court case Texas v. Johnson (1989).

== Early life, military service and early activism ==
Johnson was born in Richmond, Indiana. His father spent several years of Gregory's childhood in prison. His mother, Sally, was a supporter of the civil rights movement who married a staff sergeant in the United States Army. Johnson grew up in a racially mixed, low-income neighborhood of Richmond. In 1969, he moved with his family to an American military base in West Germany, where he was influenced by growing opposition to the Vietnam War among Vietnam War draftees.

His family returned to the United States in 1971. In 1973, he dropped out of high school and joined the United States Merchant Marine, which took him to Panama and Mexico, where he observed American sociopolitical and economic influence. After moving to Tampa, Florida in 1976, he joined the Revolutionary Communist Youth Brigade, the youth arm of the Revolutionary Communist Party, USA.

At the time of his arrest for flag desecration in Dallas, Johnson was a resident of Atlanta, Georgia, and had traveled to Dallas to protest at the 1984 Republican National Convention.

== Role as defendant in Texas v. Johnson ==
On 22 August 1984, Johnson participated in a political demonstration called the "Republican War Chest Tour" in Dallas, Texas to protest the policies of several Dallas-area businesses and of the Ronald Reagan presidential administration. The demonstration was timed to coincide with the 1984 Republican National Convention being held in downtown Dallas. During the demonstration, approximately one hundred protesters marched in the streets, chanted slogans, and staged anti-nuclear weapons and anti-war die-ins at various corporate offices. Some protesters vandalized businesses by spray-painting building walls and knocking over potted plants and ashtrays. Johnson did not take part in the vandalism, but took an American flag that had been seized from a flagpole at one of the buildings by another protester.

At the culmination of the protest outside Dallas City Hall, Johnson poured kerosene on the flag and set it on fire. While the flag burned, he chanted political slogans, including "Reagan, Mondale, which will it be? Either one means World War III;" "Ronald Reagan, killer of the hour, Perfect example of U.S. power;" and "red, white and blue, we spit on you, you stand for plunder, you will go under." Some witnesses testified that they were seriously offended. No one was hurt or threatened with injury during the protest.

Johnson was not the only protester to be charged with a crime. Other charges included: vandalism, disorderly conduct, and a class C misdemeanor with a two hundred dollar fine, and of using abusive and obscene language in a public place causing a crowd to form. He was convicted of the desecration of a venerated object in violation of Texas Penal Code Annotated § 42.11(a)(3), sentenced to one year in prison, and fined $2,000.

Johnson appealed his conviction to the Fifth Court of Appeals of Texas, but lost. He next petitioned the Texas Court of Criminal Appeals to review the decision. That court overturned his conviction, saying that the State of Texas could not punish Johnson for burning the flag because the First Amendment to the United States Constitution protects such activity as symbolic speech. The court also concluded that the flag burning in this case did not cause or threaten to cause a breach of the peace.

The State of Texas asked the Supreme Court of the United States to hear the case. Attorneys David D. Cole and radical civil rights activist William Kunstler acted as Johnson's lawyers. In 1989, the Supreme Court handed down a controversial 5–4 decision in favor of Gregory Johnson, holding that Johnson's conviction for flag desecration was inconsistent with the First Amendment. The Court's decision invalidated laws against flag desecration in force in forty-eight of the fifty states.

== Second flag burning ==
In response to the Supreme Court decision in Texas v. Johnson, the United States Congress enacted legislation outlawing the desecration of the flag, which then-President George H. W. Bush allowed to pass into law without his signature. The Flag Protection Act of 1989 went into effect at midnight on 28 October 1989.

On 30 October, Gregory Johnson joined Shawn Eichman, David Blalock, and Scott Tyler on the steps of the United States Capitol in Washington, D.C., where they set fire to three American flags while chanting "burn, baby, burn." The four protesters were arrested and spent the night in jail. The next day, Eichman, Blalock, and Tyler were charged with violating the Flag Protection Act of 1989, demonstrating without a permit, and disorderly conduct. However, the United States Attorney's Office declined to file charges against Johnson, claiming that there was insufficient evidence to prosecute him. Johnson declared that the government's decision not to charge him was an "act of cowardice" and a "miscarriage of justice," and stated that he was outraged.

The consolidated cases of Shawn Eichman, David Blalock, and Scott Tyler eventually reached the Supreme Court with Eichman as the named respondent in United States v. Eichman (1990), which was argued together with the case United States v. Haggerty (1990). Mark Haggerty, Jennifer Campbell, Darius Strong and Carlos Garza were also charged with having violated the Flag Protection Act of 1989 outside a Seattle, Washington, post office just a few minutes after the law went into effect on 28 October. The Supreme Court handed down its decision on United States v. Eichman on 11 June 1990, ruling 5–4 in favor of Eichman, Haggerty, and the other respondents, and striking down the Flag Protection Act of 1989.

The failed federal legislation triggered many unsuccessful efforts to pass an amendment to the United States Constitution banning flag desecration, including one attempt during the two weeks in October 1989 between the passage of the Flag Protection Act of 1989 and its taking effect, and another just eleven days after the United States v. Eichman ruling. The most recent attempt to send a flag desecration amendment to the states for ratification failed in the United States Senate by one vote on 27 June 2006.

== Later years ==
Johnson lived in Houston for four years after his arrest for flag desecration, during which he worked in a warehouse while his attorneys worked on his case. He was described by a contemporaneous Houston activist, Geov Parrish, as an "obnoxious young transplanted New Yorker" who would show up at "every local demonstration with a bloody, severed pig's head (tendrils still trailing along) that he'd drag along on a leash and collar while shouting anti-imperialist slogans; the pig, of course, was the United States."

Afterwards, Johnson moved to the South Bronx in New York City, then to San Francisco and Los Angeles, where he remained active with the Revolutionary Communist Youth Brigade, in time becoming the Youth Brigade's national spokesperson. He continued to speak out against legislation targeting flag desecration. He also became a Los Angeles organizer for the October 22 Coalition against police brutality and for Not in Our Name, an antiwar foreign policy organization.

Throughout 2009, Johnson, who during his Supreme Court case was a client of American civil rights attorney William Kunstler, promoted the film William Kunstler: Disturbing the Universe, a documentary that premiered at the 25th Sundance Film Festival.

On 14 October 2011, Johnson was arrested after he and two others chained themselves to the front doors of the headquarters of the California Department of Corrections and Rehabilitation in Sacramento, California. The three were protesting in support of a hunger strike being conducted by Pelican Bay State Prison inmates.

On 20 June 2016, Johnson and Revolution Club members were arrested after burning the United States flag at the 2016 Republican National Convention, but the charges were unclear. In June 2019, the City of Cleveland agreed to pay Johnson $225,000 because his 2016 arrest had been determined to have violated his free speech rights.

== See also ==
- Freedom of speech in the United States
- List of landmark court decisions in the United States
