= Dread Scott =

American artist (born 1965)

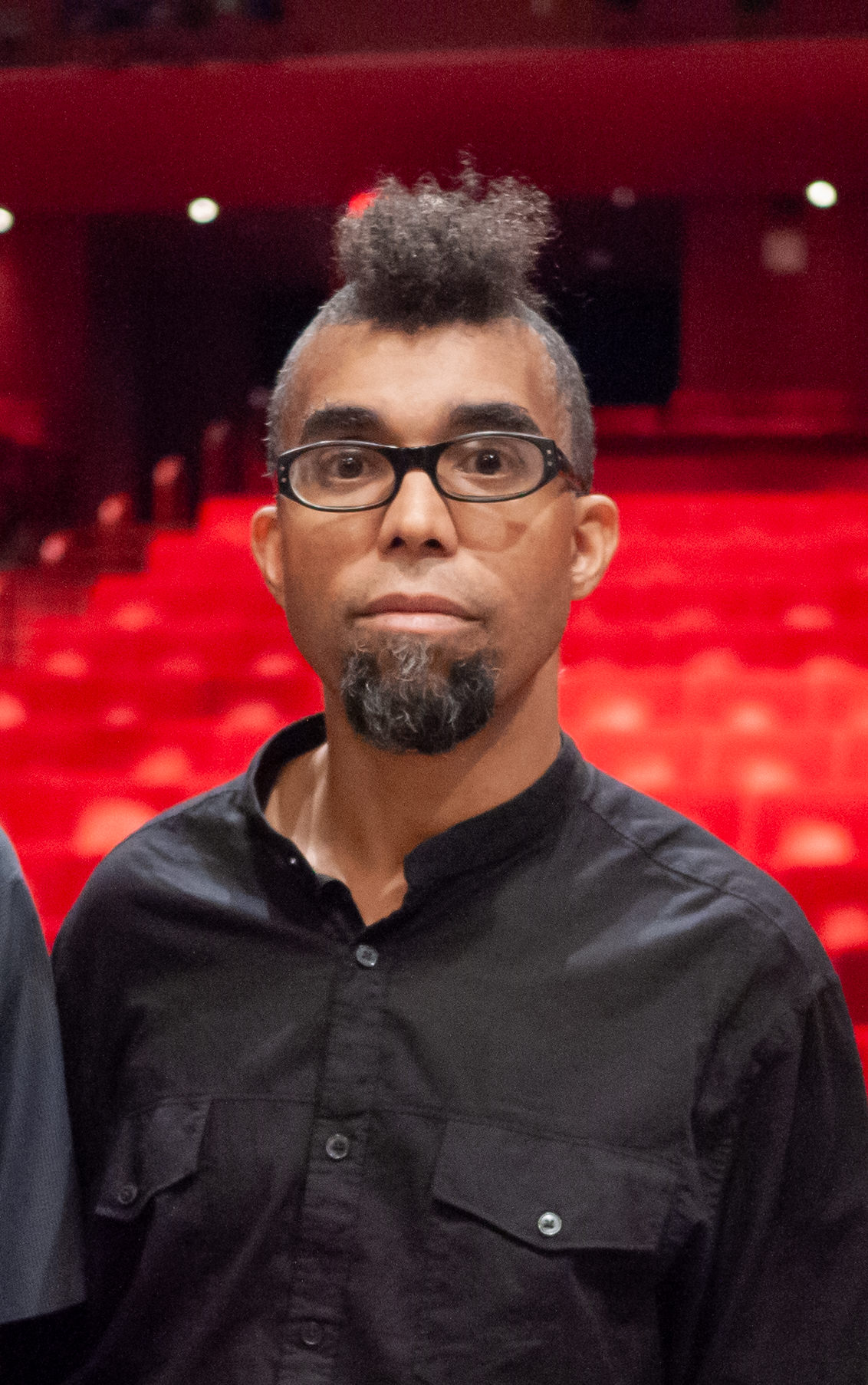
- Dread Scott in 2010
- Born: 1965 (age 59–60); Chicago, Illinois, U.S.
- Notable work: What Is the Proper Way to Display a U.S. Flag
- Awards: 2021 Guggenheim Fellowship, 2020 United States Artists Fellowship
- Website: www.dreadscott.net

Scott W. Tyler (born 1965), known professionally as Dread Scott, is an American artist whose works, often participatory in nature, focus on the experience of African Americans in the contemporary United States. His first major work, What Is the Proper Way to Display a U.S. Flag (1989), was at the center of a controversy regarding whether his piece resulted in desecration of the American flag. Scott would later be one of the defendants in United States v. Eichman, a Supreme Court case in which it was eventually decided that federal laws banning flag desecration were unconstitutional.

== Early life and Art Institute of Chicago ==
Scott was raised in Hyde Park, Chicago, the only son of his father, a photographer, and mother, who was "largely a housewife" but became a travel agent when Scott's father became ill and unable to work. For twelve years, Scott attended the upper-class Latin School, where other students often directed racial slurs towards him.

Scott attended college at the School of the Art Institute of Chicago. He later moved to New York City to begin his artistic career. His adopted name, "Dread", had multiple meanings: combined with his first name, it evoked Dred Scott, a black slave who unsuccessfully sued for his freedom during the 1850s, after having been held in a free state; was an allusion to the dreadlocks of Rastafarians; and reflected a desire to cause "dread" among others.

In 1989, while attending the Art Institute, Scott exhibited What Is the Proper Way to Display a U.S. Flag, a participatory work that invited viewers to write comments in a ledger, mounted on a podium that stood at one end of an American flag spread on the floor. The work consisted of a collage, which featured flag-covered coffins and South Korean students burning the American flag, and an American flag placed on the floor beneath the aforementioned ledger. Participants were seemingly directed to step on the flag to leave messages, though it was possible to avoid touching the flag by approaching the ledger from the side. The exhibit generated intense controversy: several major politicians, including George H. W. Bush, condemned the exhibit.

As a result of Scott's exhibit and the unrelated decision in Texas v. Johnson, the United States Congress decided to make flag desecration illegal in 1989 with the Flag Protection Act. Scott was one of four people arrested for burning flags on the steps of the United States Capitol in protest against the law. The arrests were appealed up to the Supreme Court in United States v. Eichman. The Court ruled in favor of Scott and the other protesters, declaring federal laws regulating flag desecration unconstitutional.

== Recent works ==
In response to the deaths of unarmed African Americans Alton Sterling and Philando Castile at the hands of police, Scott created a flag, reading "A Man Was Lynched by Police Yesterday", which has been produced in two separate editions, one in 2015 and the other in 2017. It was inspired by a banner that the National Association for the Advancement of Colored People (NAACP) displayed from what was then their national office in New York, reading "A MAN WAS LYNCHED YESTERDAY". In 2016, Scott's flag was flown at the Jack Shainman Gallery in Manhattan.

Scott is a character in Talene Monahon's 2020 play about historical reenactment, How to Load a Musket.

=== Slave Rebellion Reenactment (2019) ===
Around 2014, Scott began planning to re-enact the 1811 German Coast uprising in Louisiana. The revolt was the largest rebellion by enslaved individuals in North American history and took place upriver of New Orleans. The project was planned in partnership with the organization Antenna, which promotes visual and literary arts relevant to communities of New Orleans. Over two days in November 2019, Scott and fellow participants reenacted the revolt, with the process filmed by Ghanaian-British artist John Akomfrah and Black cinematographer Bradford Young, and the work was simultaneously made visible through posts on social media, pushing it beyond "a singular iconic tableau or monumental presence . . . through the accretion of multiple images of the same event, created and disseminated" collectively. Rather than ceasing at the point that the rebellion was stopped by a militia, the re-enactors instead continued on to New Orleans; for curator and poet Kristina Kay Robinson, this meant that, "questions of how to grapple with the rebellion’s bloody end were avoided altogether, as it was replaced by a 'cultural celebration' in Congo Square."

The Slave Rebellion Reenactment consisted of more than the re-enactment itself, and instead should be understood as a social and durational work that involved fundraising, recruiting participants, collaborating with New Orleans non-profits, organizing sewing circles to create costumes and props, involving researchers to clarify historical details, acquiring event permissions, and discussing the work in public forums. “The heart of the project,” Scott explained, embodies the history of "the formation of and the creation of the army of the enslaved," because this networking and planning for the reenactment were intended "to be done by word of mouth, mirroring the structure of how a slave revolt had to be assembled.”

== Collections ==
- Brooklyn Museum
- MCA San Diego
- Whitney Museum of American Art

== Awards ==
Scott is a 2023/2024 Rome Prize winner, Guggenheim Fellow, and a 2020 United States Artists Fellow.
