= Flag Act =

Flag Act, Flag Acts, Flags Act may refer to:

- Flag Acts, the three laws that define the design of the flag of the United States
- Flag Act (Philippines), an act of the Philippine Commission that outlawed the display of Katipunan flags
- Flag Act of 1865, an act of the Confederate Congress that defined the Third Confederate flag
- Flags Act 1953, an act of the Parliament of Australia which defines the official Flag of Australia

== See also ==
- Flag Protection Act
- Flag Protection Act of 2005
