= United States Flag Code =

Advisory rules for display and care of the American flag

- Long title: An Act to revise, codify, and enact without substantive change certain general and permanent laws, related to patriotic and national observances, ceremonies, and organizations, as title 36, United States Code, ‘‘Patriotic and National Observances, Ceremonies, and Organizations’’.
- Enacted by: the 105th United States Congress
- Effective: June 22, 1942

Citations
- Public law: Pub. L. 105–225 (text) (PDF)
- Statutes at Large: 112 Stat. 1498

Codification
- Acts amended: 56 Stat. 378, chapter 435; 36 U.S.C. 175
- Titles amended: Title 4 of the United States Code
- U.S.C. sections created: 4 U.S.C. ch. 5 § 5

Legislative history
- Signed into law by President Franklin D. Roosevelt on June 22, 1942

The United States Flag Code establishes advisory rules for display and care of the national flag of the United States of America. It is part of Chapter 1 of Title 4 of the United States Code (4 U.S.C. § 5 et seq). Although this is a U.S. federal law, the code is not mandatory: it uses non-binding language like "should" and "custom" throughout and does not prescribe any penalties for failure to follow the guidelines. It was "not intended to prescribe conduct" and was written to "codify various existing rules and customs."

Separately, Congress passed the Flag Protection Act of 1968 (amended in 1989) (18 U.S.C. § 700), a since struck-down criminal statute, which prohibited mutilating, defacing, defiling or burning the flag. Although it remains part of codified federal law, it is not enforceable due to the Supreme Court of the United States finding it unconstitutional in United States v. Eichman.

Additionally, the public law which includes the Flag Code (Pub. L. 105–225, largely codified in Title 36 of the U.S. Code), addresses conduct when the U.S. National Anthem is being played while the flag is present. That law suggests civilians in attendance should face the flag "at attention" (standing upright) with their hand over their heart.

== Definition of a United States flag ==
For a definition of the flag for the purposes of the Flag Code, the code refers to 4 U.S.C. § 1 and § 2 and Executive Order 10834.

The flag of the United States shall be thirteen horizontal stripes, alternate red and white; and the union of the flag shall be forty-eight stars, white in a blue field.

— 4 U.S.C. § 1

On the admission of a new State to the Union one star shall be added to the union of the flag; and such addition shall take effect on the fourth day of July then next succeeding such admission.

— 4 U.S.C. § 2

Executive Order 10834 Proportions And Sizes Of Flags And Position Of Stars prescribes the geometry of the flag design, following the pattern used in Federal Specification DDD-F-416F.

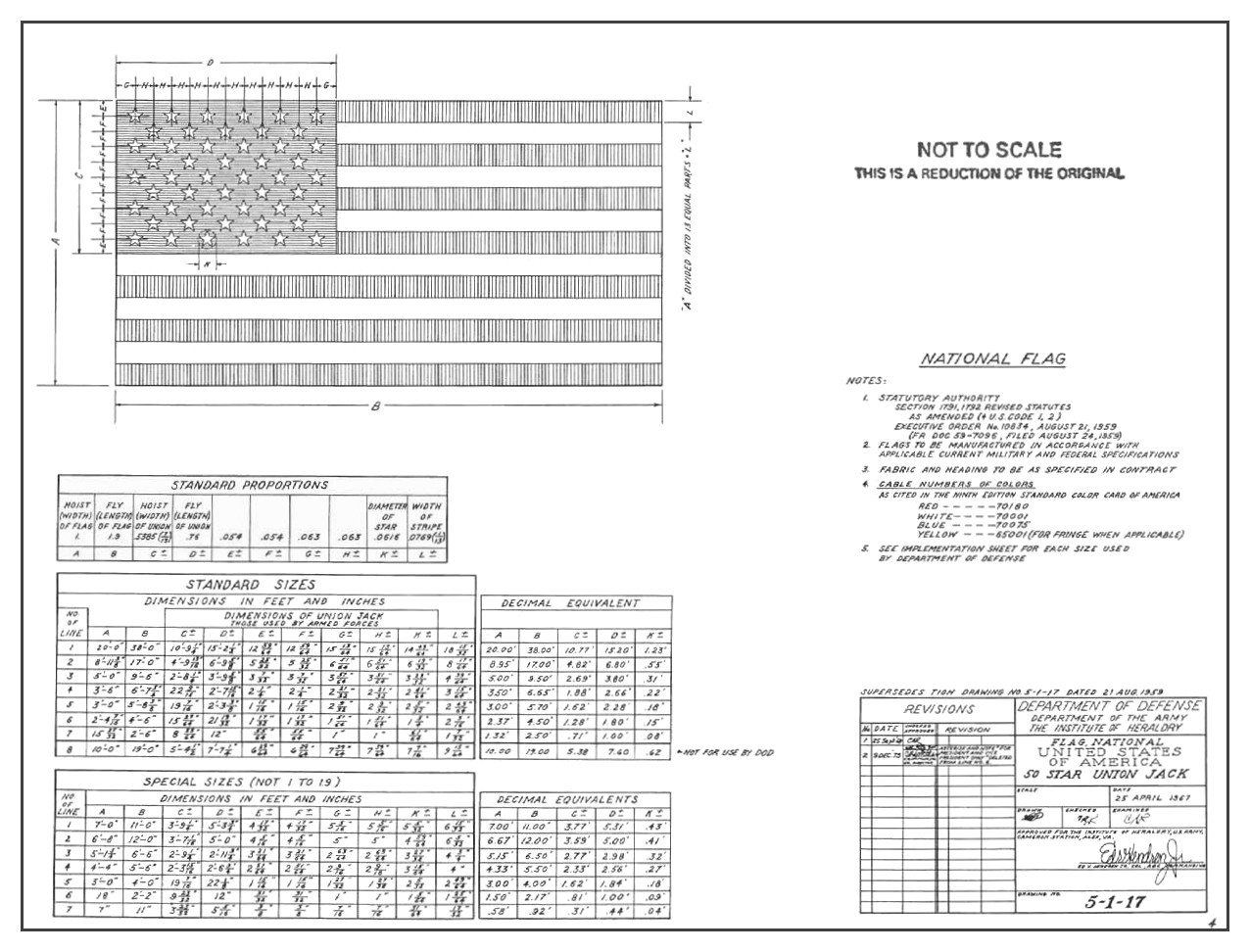
Technical Drawing TIOH 5-1-17 found in Federal Specification DDD-F-416F of proper dimensions and standards of United States Flag

== Summary of the advisory code ==
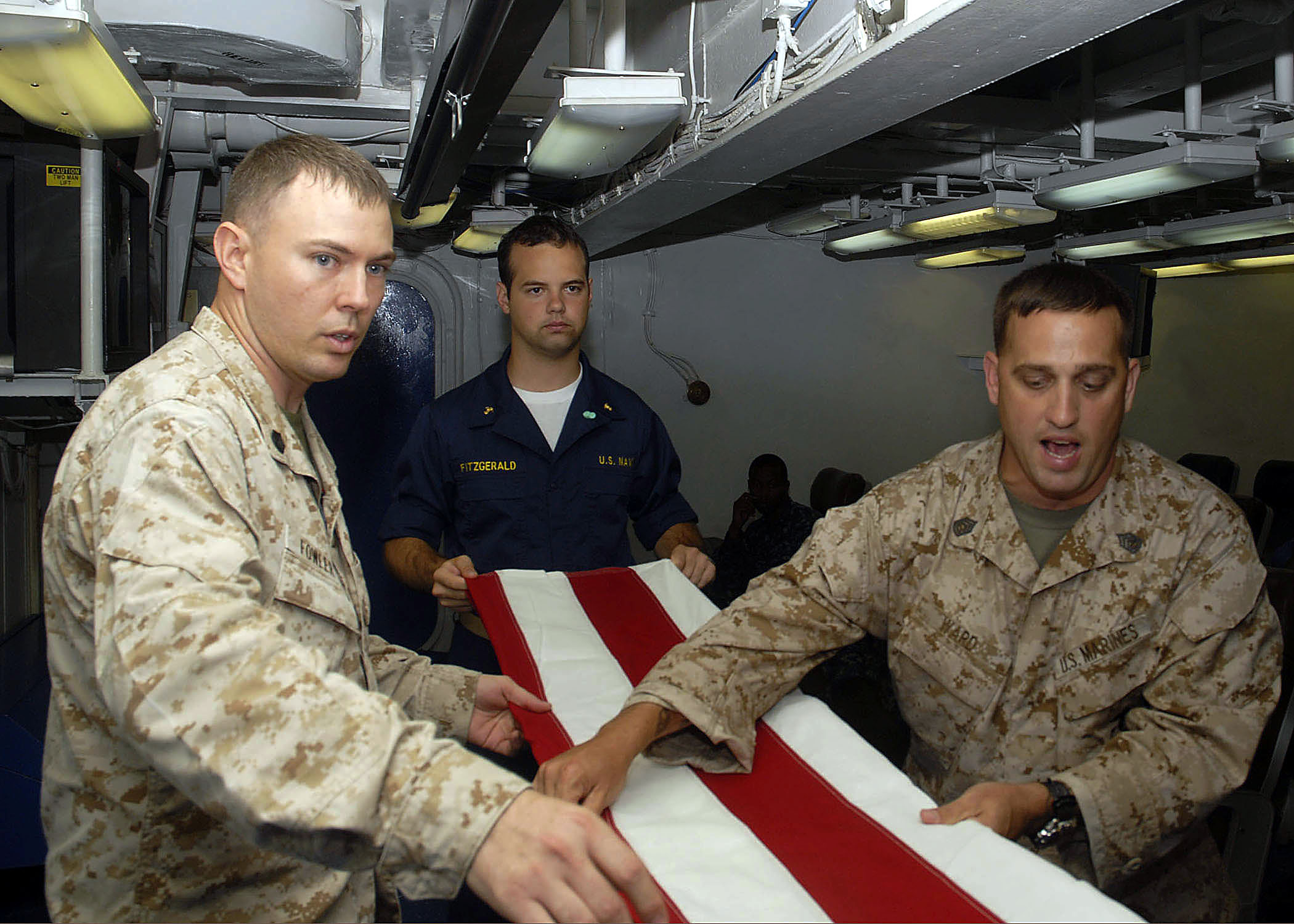
Marines and a sailor aboard USS Nassau practice folding a flag in 2009.

The proper way to fold the flag of the United States of America

- The flag should never be dipped to any person or thing, unless it is the ensign responding to a salute from a ship of a foreign nation. This is sometimes misreported as a tradition that comes from the 1908 Summer Olympics in London, where countries were asked to dip their flag to King Edward VII; American team flag bearer Ralph Rose did not follow this protocol, and teammate Martin Sheridan is often, though apocryphally, quoted as proclaiming that "this flag dips before no earthly king."
- When a flag is so tattered that it no longer fits to serve as a symbol of the United States, it should be replaced in a dignified manner, preferably by burning. The American Legion, Scouting America, Girl Scouts of the USA, TrailLife USA, U.S. Armed Forces, Veterans of Foreign Wars, and other organizations regularly conduct dignified flag retirement ceremonies.
- The flag should never be used as a receptacle for receiving, holding, carrying, or delivering anything.
- The flag should never touch anything physically beneath it. An urban myth claimed that if the flag touched the ground, it had to be destroyed under the Flag Code; however, it has been affirmed by the American Legion and state governments that this is not the case.
- The flag should never be used as wearing apparel, bedding or drapery. It should never be festooned, drawn back, nor up, in folds but always allowed to fall free.
- The flag should always be permitted to fall freely. (An exception was made during the Apollo Moon landings when the flag hung from a vertical pole designed with an extensible horizontal bar, allowing full display even in the absence of an atmosphere.)
- The flag should never be carried flat or horizontally.
- The flag should never be used for advertising purposes in any manner whatsoever.
- The flag should never have placed upon it, nor on any part of it, nor attached to it any mark, insignia, letter, word, figure, design, picture, or drawing of any nature.
- The flag should never be upside down, except to signal distress or great danger.
- When displayed vertically against a wall, the union should be to the observer’s left.

== History ==
=== Flag Day ===
Prior to Flag Day, June 14, 1923, neither the federal government nor the states had official guidelines governing the display of the United States' flag. On that date, the National Flag Code was constructed by representatives of over 68 organizations, under the auspices of the National Americanism Commission of the American Legion. The code drafted by that conference was printed by the national organization of the American Legion and given nationwide distribution.

On June 22, 1942, the code became Public Law 77-623; chapter 435. Little had changed in the code since the Flag Day 1923 Conference. The most notable change was the removal of the Bellamy salute because of its similarities to the Hitler salute.

The Freedom to Display the American Flag Act of 2005 prohibits real estate management organizations from restricting homeowners from displaying the Flag of the United States on their own property.

The Army Specialist Greg L. Chambers Federal Flag Code Amendment Act of 2007 added a provision to allow governors, or the mayor of the District of Columbia, to proclaim that the flag be flown at half-staff upon the death of a member of the Armed Forces from any State, territory, or possession who died while serving on active duty. The provision directs federal facilities in the area covered by the governor or mayor of the District of Columbia to fly the flag at half-staff consistent with such proclamations.

The Duncan Hunter National Defense Authorization Act for Fiscal Year 2009 (Sec. 595.) allows the military salute for the flag during the national anthem by members of the Armed Forces not in uniform and by veterans.

=== Notable contraventions of the code ===
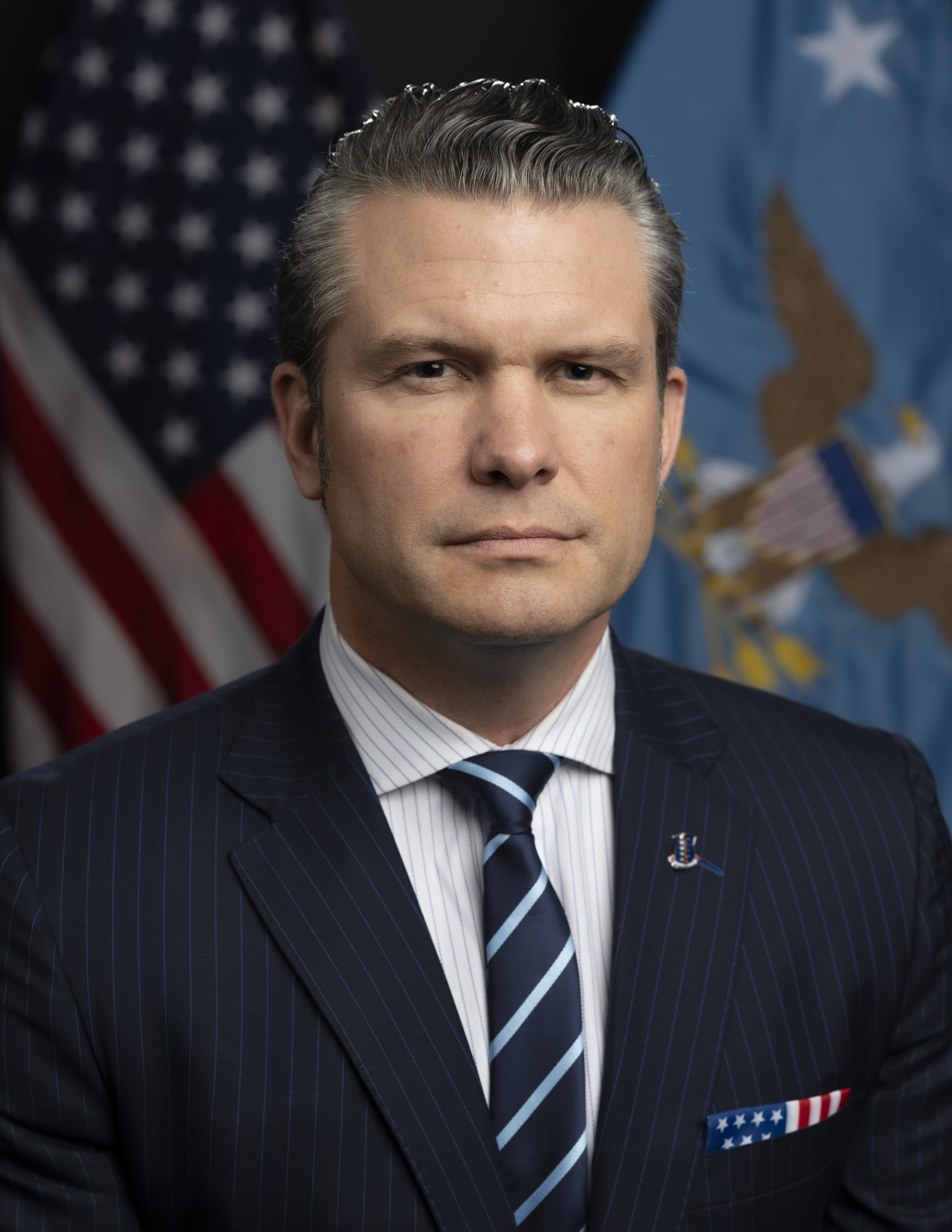
Pete Hegseth's official portrait, showing his signature American flag handkerchief contravening 4 U.S.C. § 8(d)

Pete Hegseth, US Secretary of Defense in the second Trump administration, normally wears an American flag handkerchief.

At sporting events, in particular football games, it had become common for servicemembers to unfurl a large flag horizontally across the field, despite horizontal displays being proscribed. In 2025, the Pentagon updated its guidance to allow such displays to be carried out.
