= Flag Desecration Amendment =

Proposed constitutional amendment to the United States Constitution

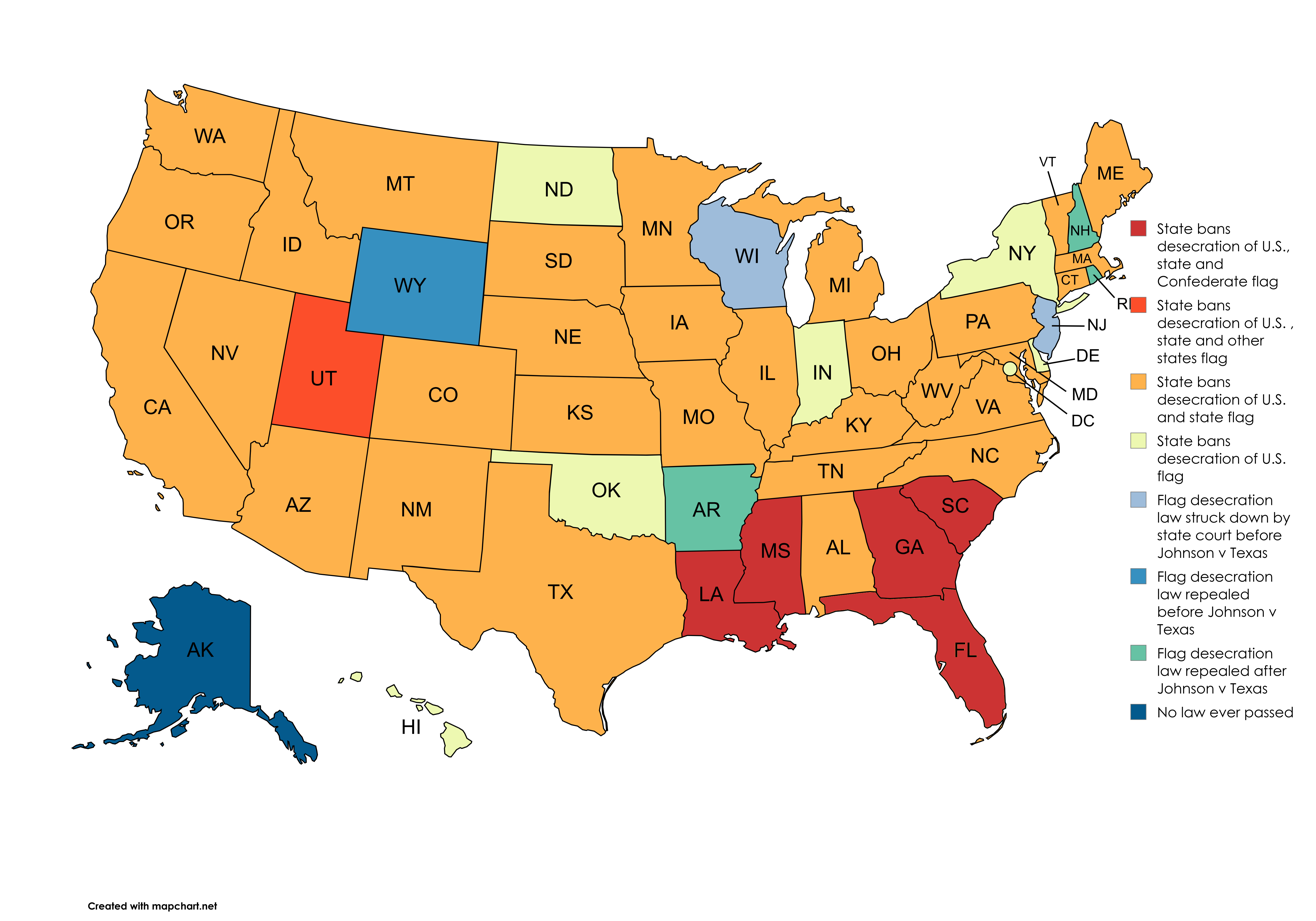
Maps of flag desecration laws in the United States, unenforceable since Texas v. Johnson

The Flag Desecration Amendment (often referred to as the Flag-Burning Amendment) is a proposed addition to the Constitution of the United States that would allow the U.S. Congress to prohibit by statute and provide punishment for the physical "desecration" of the flag of the United States. The concept of flag desecration continues to provoke a heated debate over protecting a national symbol, preserving free speech, and upholding the liberty said to be represented by that national symbol. While the proposal passed by the two-thirds majority required in the House of Representatives several times, in each instance it failed to attain the same required super-majority in the Senate, or was never voted upon in the Senate at all.

While the proposed amendment is frequently referred to colloquially in terms of expression of political views through "flag burning", the language would permit the prohibition of all forms of flag desecration, which may take forms other than burning, such as using the flag for clothing or napkins.

The most recent legislative attempt to propose a flag desecration amendment to come to a vote in both the House and Senate in the same congressional session failed in the Senate by one vote on June 27, 2006. Senator Steve Daines (R-MT) introduced a joint resolution to ban flag burning on June 14, 2019, and received support from the Trump administration, but the resolution was unsuccessful. Daines reintroduced the resolution on June 14, 2021.

== Historical background ==
The first federal Flag Protection Act was passed by Congress in 1968 in response to protest burnings of the flag at demonstrations against the Vietnam War. Over time, 48 of the 50 U.S. states also enacted similar flag protection laws. In 1989, the Supreme Court of the United States overturned all of these statutes by a 5–4 vote in the case Texas v. Johnson as unconstitutional restrictions of public expression. Congress responded to the Johnson decision afterwards by passing another flag protection act. In 1990, the Supreme Court reaffirmed Johnson by the same 5–4 majority in United States v. Eichman declaring that flag burning was constitutionally protected free speech.

In both cases, William J. Brennan Jr. wrote the majority opinion, joined by Thurgood Marshall, Harry Blackmun, Antonin Scalia, and Anthony Kennedy (Kennedy also authored a separate concurrence in Johnson), and the dissenters in both cases were then-Chief Justice William Rehnquist (who authored a dissent in Johnson), and justices John Paul Stevens (who authored dissents in both cases), Byron White and Sandra Day O'Connor.

The decisions were controversial and have prompted Congress to consider the only remaining legal avenue to enact flag protection statutes—a constitutional amendment. Following the Johnson decision, successive sessions of Congress considered creating a flag desecration amendment. From 1995 to 2005, beginning with the 104th Congress, the proposed amendment was approved biennially by the two-thirds majority necessary in the U.S. House of Representatives, but it consistently failed to achieve the same constitutionally required super-majority vote in the U.S. Senate. During some sessions, the proposed amendment did not even come to a vote in the Senate before the expiration of the Congress's term. In June 2006, during the 109th Congress, the amendment failed by one vote in the Senate. Some Senate Republican aides indicated that almost a dozen of the Republican senators who voted for the amendment were privately opposed to it, and they believed that these senators would have voted to defeat the amendment if required.

== Proposed amendment ==
The full text of the amendment (passed several times by the U.S. House of Representatives) is as follows:

The Congress shall have power to prohibit the physical desecration of the flag of the United States.

This proposed amendment would empower Congress to enact statutes criminalizing the burning or other "desecration" of the United States flag in a public protest. The wording is permissive rather than mandatory; that is, it permits Congress to prohibit flag burning, but it does not require it. The question of whether flag burning should be banned would become a matter for the legislature to decide, rather than the courts.

Proponents of legislation to proscribe flag burning argue that burning the flag is a very offensive gesture that deserves to be outlawed. Opponents maintain that giving Congress such power would essentially limit the principle of freedom of speech, enshrined in the First Amendment to the United States Constitution and symbolized by the flag itself.

The theories underlying these First Amendment principles include: a robust national discourse about political and social ideas; individual self-realization; the search for truth; and speech as a "safety valve". These concepts are expounded in both the majority and dissenting opinions of the cases described below. There Justice William J. Brennan Jr. noted that the "principal function of free speech under our system of government is to invite dispute; it may indeed best serve its high purpose when it induces condition of unrest, creates dissatisfaction with conditions as they are, or even stirs people to anger."

== Polls ==
A USA Today/Gallup Poll in June 2006 showed 56% supporting a constitutional amendment, down from 63% favoring a flag burning amendment in Gallup's 1999 poll. Another poll conducted by CNN in June 2006 also found that 56% of Americans supported a flag desecration amendment. In contrast, a summer 2005 poll by the First Amendment Center found that 63% of Americans opposed amending the constitution to outlaw flag burning, up from 53% in 2004.

A June 2020 YouGov poll found that 49% think it should be illegal to burn or intentionally destroy the flag, while 34% said it should be legal.

=== Congressional votes ===
During each term of Congress from 1995 to 2005, the proposed amendment was passed by the House of Representatives, but not the Senate, falling four votes short on two occasions in the upper house. As approved by the House of Representatives each time, the joint resolutions called for ratification by state legislatures, of which a minimum of 38 state legislative approvals would be required (three-fourths of the 50 states), within a period of seven years following the proposal by both houses of Congress. As can be seen by the votes in the House of Representatives, support for the amendment appears to be slipping with only 286 'yea' votes during the 109th Congress in 2005, in contrast to the 312 'yea' votes almost a decade earlier during the 104th.

The chronology of the Congress' action upon the flag-desecration amendment runs over a period of more than ten years:

Congress	Resolution(s)	Vote date	Yes	No	Ref.
104th Congress	House Joint Resolution 79	June 28, 1995	312	120	
104th Congress	Senate Joint Resolution 31	December 12, 1995	63	36	
105th Congress	House Joint Resolution 54	June 12, 1997	310	114	
106th Congress	House Joint Resolution 33	June 24, 1999	305	124	
106th Congress	Senate Joint Resolution 14	March 29, 2000	63	37	
107th Congress	House Joint Resolution 36	July 17, 2001	298	125	
108th Congress	House Joint Resolution 4	June 3, 2003	300	125	
109th Congress	House Joint Resolution 10	June 22, 2005	286	130	
109th Congress	Senate Joint Resolution 12	June 27, 2006	66	34	

To be added to the Constitution, it must be approved by a two-thirds vote of those present and voting in both houses of Congress, as well as be ratified by at least three-fourths of either (1) the 50 state legislatures or (2) ratifying conventions in each of the 50 states (Congress has the power to choose the mode of ratification). Senators had until the end of 2006 to take action on H.J. Res. 10 during the remainder of the 109th Congress. On March 7, 2006, Senate Majority Leader Bill Frist announced that he would bring the bill for consideration in June 2006. On Monday, June 26, 2006, the Senate began debate on the proposed amendment. The following day, the amendment, sponsored by Senator Orrin Hatch, fell one vote short in the Senate, with 66 in support and 34 opposed. The Republican nay votes were Bob Bennett (UT), Lincoln Chafee (RI), and Mitch McConnell (KY). The vote on Senator Richard Durbin's alternative amendment, which would have given Congress the power to ban flag desecration intended to intimidate or breach peace on federal land, was 36–64. Opponents pointed to the proximity of the vote to the November 7, 2006 Congressional Election, and claimed that the vote (and a recent vote on the Federal Marriage Amendment) was election year grandstanding.

== Potential interpretations of the amendment ==
In 2005, the First Amendment Center published a report titled "Implementing a Flag-Desecration Amendment to the U.S. Constitution: An end to the controversy ... or a new beginning?" The report pointed out that the effect of the proposed amendment would likely be challenged on collateral matters in ways that would require the courts, and ultimately the U.S. Supreme Court, to parse the exact meaning of ambiguous terms contained therein. The focus of the report was on the meanings that would be assigned to the phrases, "physical desecration" and "flag of the United States".

The amendment might be interpreted as being limited to flags that meet the exact specifications for the United States flag laid out in federal law, as in the above image; see Flag of the United States for further details regarding these specifications.

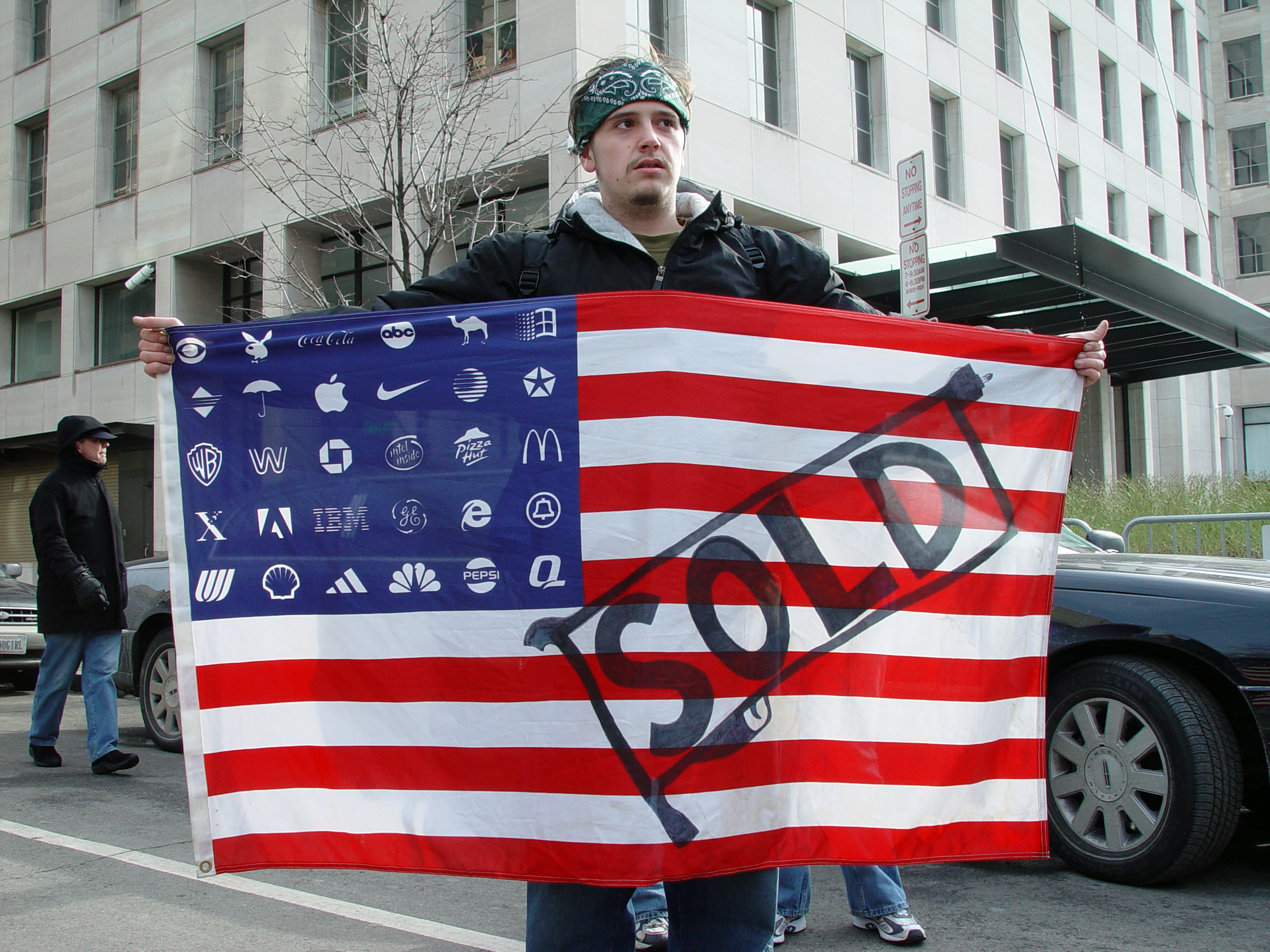
It remains an open question whether flags such as this one, which contains corporate logos in place of the fifty stars, would fall under the amendment.

The phrase "physical desecration" might be open to various interpretations concerning the uncertainty of the context of desecration. For example, uncertainty exists over whether the term includes the wearing of the flag as clothing, as a tattoo, or flying a flag upside-down. It is uncertain what can be interpreted as "physical desecration". Does it require that the flag be physically damaged, or made to appear damaged? It is also unclear whether "virtual flag desecration" (which could be defined as an artistic depiction of flag desecration, a computerized simulation of flag desecration, or burning any object which has a flag on it) would be subject to the amendment. There is also the question whether the perpetrator of such an act is required to have a specific intent to "desecrate" to be prosecuted. The Report of the 108th Congress, in proposing this amendment, stated:

... 'desecrate' means deface, damage, or otherwise physically mistreat in a way that the actor knows will seriously offend one or more persons likely to observe or discover his action...

This seems to suggest that the amendment would apply only to acts where the actor intends offense.

Since the amendment would allow prohibition against only "the flag of the United States", it could be construed as only applying to flags that are the property of the United States government, as opposed to personal or private property. This language could also be interpreted as being limited to flags that meet the exact specifications for the United States flag laid out in federal law. It is unclear what effect the amendment would have with respect to former flags of the United States, such as the 48-star flag that preceded the admission of Alaska and Hawaii, or the original 13-star Betsy Ross flag, or how far from the traditional definition of a flag a symbol could deviate (for example, having orange stripes instead of red) before falling out of the ambit of the amendment's jurisdiction.

The First Amendment Center concluded that the Supreme Court was likely to interpret this language narrowly, resulting in decisions that would not satisfy either proponents or opponents of the proposed amendment. These questions would necessarily await the interpretative role of the courts, and such a process would likely require several years for the resolution of each issue.

== See also ==
- Street v. New York (1969)
- Censorship in the United States
- Freedom of speech in the United States
- United States Flag Code
