= Revolutionary Communist Youth Brigade =

Former communist youth group

The Revolutionary Communist Youth Brigade (RCYB) was the former youth group of the Revolutionary Communist Party, USA.

== History ==
The Attica Brigade was an anti-imperialist student organization in the United States in the early 1970s. It was initiated in 1972 by the Revolutionary Union. The Attica Brigade aimed to fill the vacuum of left-wing activism on campuses after Students for a Democratic Society split in 1969. The name of the organization is inspired by the Attica prison uprising in 1971. Attica Brigade organized an Eastern regional conference that drew 250 attendants from 31 campus chapters in New York on March 31 - April 1, 1973.

In 1974 the Attica Brigade changed its name to the Revolutionary Student Brigade at a conference, attended by about 450 students from 80 campuses, on June 15–17. The Revolutionary Student Brigade (RSB) was a Marxist-Leninist student organization active in the 1970s in the United States. The RSB was the student organization associated with the Revolutionary Union, which became the Revolutionary Communist Party in 1975.

When the RCP split in 1977 this struggle was reflected in the RSB; a significant section of the Revolutionary Student Brigade left the RCP, taking the RSB name with them. They joined the Revolutionary Workers Headquarters, a new Marxist-Leninist organization which emerged from the RCP. Those who remained in the RCP and renamed their organization the Revolutionary Communist Youth Brigade. Disagreement over how to organize students and youth played a role in the RCP-RWH split.

In 1980, what was left of the RSB joined with the Student Coalition Against Nukes Nationwide (SCANN) and Midwest Coalition Against Registration and the Draft (MidCARD) to found a new organization, the Progressive Student Network. Prior to this merger, the RSB cadre had been active in both of the other two organizations.

== Objective ==
RCYB’s ultimate objective was to help create “a world of for-real Communism; a world where a few rich nations don’t oppress and dominate the globe; where whites don’t lord over non-whites; where men don’t dominate over women; and where one class of people doesn’t exploit the rest.”

== Activities ==
During its existence, perhaps the most famous member of the RCYB was Gregory Lee Johnson, who during the 1984 Republican National Convention in Dallas, Texas, burned the United States flag to protest the policies of the Reagan administration. Johnson was arrested and convicted, but had his conviction overturned on appeal. The State of Texas then sought and obtained review by the Supreme Court. In Texas v. Johnson, a five-justice majority of the court held that Johnson’s act of flag burning was protected speech under the First Amendment to the United States Constitution.

In 1978 Revolutionary Communist Youth Brigade published Minorities and whites, unite to smash the Bakke decision! In 1979 they protested nuclear weapons. In 1989, Antonin Scalia and four other justices ruled that a Revolutionary Communist Youth Brigade member's right to burn the US flag was a protected right. In 1991 they protested American involvement in the Persian Gulf, and members were arrested. In 1992 they participated in agitation and organization efforts during the Rodney King protests and riots in Los Angeles.

== See also ==
- Revolutionary Youth Movement
