= A man was lynched yesterday flag =

NAACP practice between 1936 and 1938

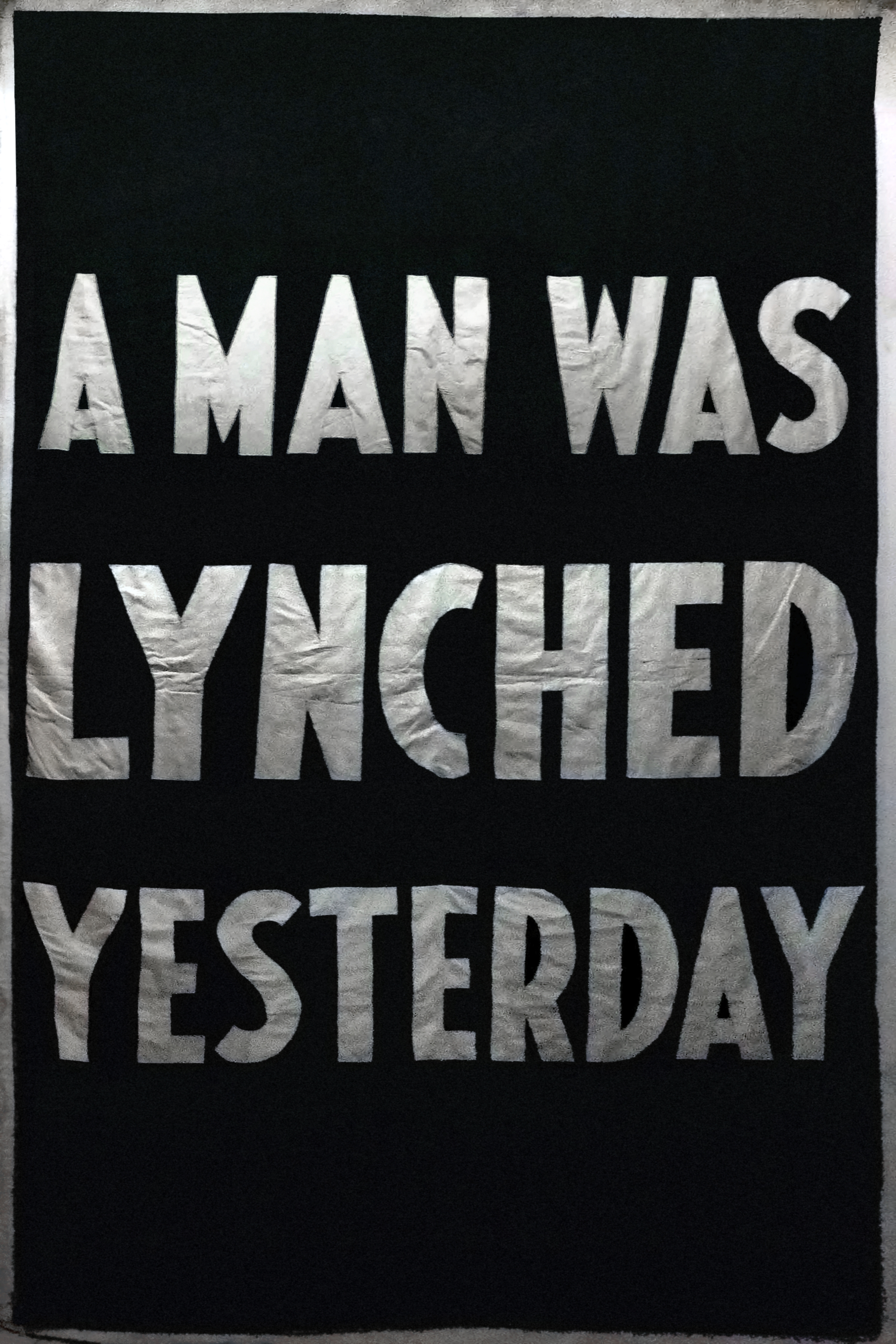
The NAACP flag exhibited by the Library of Congress

A flag bearing the words "A man was lynched yesterday" was flown from the national headquarters of the National Association for the Advancement of Colored People (NAACP) between 1936 and 1938 to mark lynchings of black people in the United States. It was part of a decades-long anti-lynching campaign by the NAACP that began after the 1916 lynching of Jesse Washington. The flag was first flown after the lynching of A. L. McCamy in Dalton, Georgia, in 1936, and was stopped from flying in 1938 after the NAACP's landlord threatened them with eviction if they continued the practice.

A similar flag, inspired by the original, was created by artist Dread Scott in 2015. It read "A man was lynched by police yesterday" and was exhibited at art galleries.

== Original flag ==
External image
- Library of Congress photograph of the original flag in 1936

The National Association for the Advancement of Colored People (NAACP) developed the flag as a means to protest against the lynching of black people in the United States. A campaign against the practice was launched after the 1916 lynching of Jesse Washington in Waco, Texas. The NAACP published graphic photographs of the lynching and raised $20,000 to be used to pursue the ends of justice.

The NAACP first flew the flag on September 8, 1936, to mark the lynching of A. L. McCamy in Dalton, Georgia. (Note: Some sources indicate such a flag was used by the NAACP as early as 1920.) The flag continued to be flown at NAACP's headquarters at 69 Fifth Avenue in Manhattan the day after news of a lynching reached the organization. The 6-by-10-foot (1.8 by 3.0 m) flag was simple and had the white text "A MAN WAS LYNCHED YESTERDAY" on a black background. The bold typeface is thought to have been chosen to best convey the message quickly to a crowd of people.

The organization stopped the practice in 1938 after it was threatened with eviction by their landlords over the matter. The original flag survives and is now in the collection of the Library of Congress. It was displayed at the library's Thomas Jefferson Building in Washington DC as part of a 2015 exhibition entitled The Civil Rights Act of 1964: A Long Struggle for Freedom.

== Modern artistic interpretation ==
A modern art installation has been created by African American Dread Scott, inspired by the original NAACP flag. Scott was inspired to create the flag, which reads "A MAN WAS LYNCHED BY POLICE YESTERDAY", following the 2015 shooting of Walter Scott whilst running from a police officer in South Carolina. Scott said that the work, which he entitled simply A Man Was Lynched by Police Yesterday, was intended to provoke public dialogue and act as a sign of hope that people can learn from history. He stated that police shootings in the 21st century played the same role in terrorizing black people that lynchings did in earlier times. The work was originally displayed at the Moberg Gallery in Des Moines, Iowa. The New York Times described the work as memorable for its simplicity and high contrast between white lettering and black background.

The flag was exhibited on the facade of the Jack Shainman Gallery in New York in 2016, after Shainman was shown a photograph of the work by artist Hank Willis Thomas. The gallery is located on 20th Street, just a few blocks west of the old NAACP headquarters. It was a last minute addition to the gallery's For Freedoms exhibition, held in the wake of the July 2016 shootings of Alton Sterling in Louisiana and Philando Castile in Minnesota. Shainman said at the time that "given the horrific events of the past week, we were compelled to take a stand amidst initial feelings of helplessness and grief. At this point, I feel a moral obligation to take action". Scott brought the work to New York on July 7, to hang it himself but en route noticed a demonstration against the police shootings in Union Square and decided to fly the flag there.

Scott's work received some negative feedback as some considered its language to be provocative and the message to be anti-police. The artist was told that he himself should be lynched. The Shainman Gallery was also criticized for continuing to fly the flag on its facade following the July 7 murder of five police officers in Dallas. In response to threats the New York police put the gallery under protective watch.

The gallery was later forced to remove the flag from the front of the building after legal threats from their landlord who stated that the lease specified that nothing could be affixed to the facade of the building. It was removed and thereafter exhibited inside the gallery. In November 2016 the work was exhibited at the Contemporary Arts Center in New Orleans.
