= David D. Cole =

American legal scholar

David Cole
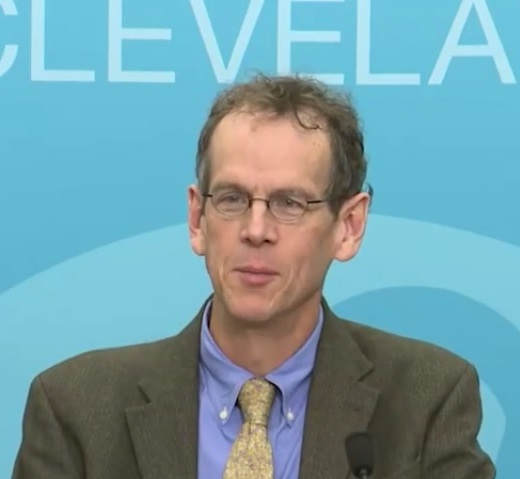
- Cole in 2016
- Education: Yale University (BA, JD)
- Spouse: Cornelia Pillard

David D. Cole is an American attorney, who served as the National Legal Director of the American Civil Liberties Union (ACLU) for six years until 2024. Earlier, for two years Cole was the Hon. George J. Mitchell Professor in Law and Public Policy at the Georgetown University Law Center. He has published on legal issues including constitutional law, national security, criminal justice, civil rights, and law and literature. Cole has litigated First Amendment cases in the Supreme Court of the United States, as well as cases concerning civil rights and national security. He has also been a legal correspondent to media outlets and publications.

== Legal career ==
Cole graduated magna cum laude from Yale College in 1980 and received his Juris Doctor (J.D.) degree from Yale Law School in 1984. He then served as a law clerk to Judge Arlin Adams of the United States Court of Appeals for the Third Circuit. He then became a staff attorney for the Center for Constitutional Rights, where he litigated a number of First Amendment cases, including Texas v. Johnson, 491 U.S. 397 (1989) and United States v. Eichman, 496 U.S. 928 (1990; consolidated with United States v. Haggerty; arguing that burning the Flag of the United States was protected speech). He later served as a voluntary staff attorney at the center, where he also sat on the Board of Directors from 1996 to 2003.

After leaving the center, Cole began teaching at Georgetown University Law Center. While teaching, Cole continued to litigate constitutional law and civil liberties, both at home and abroad. During the 1990s, Cole argued over a dozen cases in various U.S. District and Circuit Courts, and appeared before the Supreme Court three times (Lebron v. National Railroad Passenger Corporation, 513 U.S. 374 (1995), National Endowment for the Arts v. Finley, 524 U.S. 569 (1998), and Reno v. American-Arab Anti-Discrimination Committee, 525 U.S. 471 (1999)). Internationally, Cole successfully challenged Ireland's constitutional prohibition on counseling about abortion before the European Court of Human Rights in Open Door Counselling, Ltd. v. Republic of Ireland, ECHR Judgment of October 19, 1992, Ser. A, No. 246. He returned to Europe in Fall 2007 to teach at the University College London School of Public Policy and serve as co-director of the Center for Transnational Legal Studies in London from 2008 to 2009.

Cole was named co-chair of the Constitution Project's Liberty and Security Committee in 2001 and joined the Advisory Committee for the Free Expression Policy Project in 2003. He has served on boards for a number of public interest organizations including Human Rights Watch Advisory Committee, Bill of Rights Defense Committee, and the American Bar Association Standing Committee on Law and National Security. His most recent appearance before the Supreme Court was in 2010, unsuccessfully challenging the First and Fifth Amendment implications of the USA Patriot Act's prohibition on providing "material support" to terrorist groups in Holder v. Humanitarian Law Project, 561 U.S. 1 (2010). From 2013 to 2014, Cole was a Fellow with the Open Society Foundations, an international grantmaking network founded by business magnate George Soros that dispenses financial contributions to various liberal and progressive political causes in the United States.

== Academic career ==
Cole was a member of the Georgetown University Law Center faculty from 1990 to 2016. He has also taught at New York University Law School and University College London's School of Public Policy as a visiting scholar. Cole's main areas of expertise were constitutional law, criminal procedure, national security, and law relating to United States federal courts. He gained tenure at Georgetown Law in 1994, and was selected as the school's inaugural Hon. George J. Mitchell Professor in Law and Public Policy.

Cole has written eight books, for which he has received awards, including the Palmer Civil Liberties Prize for best book on national security and civil liberties, the American Book Award (2004), and Boston Book Review's Best Non-Fiction Book (1999). His most recent book, Engines of Liberty: The Power of Citizen Activists to Make Constitutional Law, was named one of the Washington Post's Notable Nonfiction Books of 2016. He has been published in law journals, including the Yale Law Journal, Stanford Law Review, University of Chicago Law Review, and California Law Review.

== Media commentary ==
Cole has been the Legal Affairs Correspondent for The Nation since 1998. He is also a commentator on the National Public Radio program All Things Considered, providing viewpoints from a liberal / progressive perspective, and a contributor to the New York Review of Books. He was interviewed in the 2004 BBC documentary The Power of Nightmares - The Rise Of The Politics Of Fear.

== Honors and awards ==
Cole has received awards from professional bodies and campaigning groups for his civil rights and civil liberties work, including from the American Bar Association's Individual Rights and Responsibilities Section, the National Lawyers Guild, the American-Arab Anti-Discrimination Committee, and the American Muslim Council. In 2004 he received the William J. Brennan Award from the Thomas Jefferson Center for the Protection of Free Expression, which cited Cole as "one of the nation's most accomplished advocates for freedom of expression and an outstanding scholar of the First Amendment". In 2013 Cole also was the first recipient of the ACLU's Norman Dorsen Presidential Prize for academic contributions to civil liberties.

== Publications ==
- Cole, David (November 1994). "Playing by Pornography's Rules: The Regulation of Sexual Expression". University of Pennsylvania Law Review. 143 (1). The University of Pennsylvania Law Review: 111–177. doi:10.2307/3312517. JSTOR 3312517. Archived from the original on October 8, 2014.
- Cole, David (2000). No Equal Justice: Race and Class in the American Criminal Justice System. New York City: The New Press. ISBN 1-56584-566-8. OCLC 40678592.
- Cole, David; James X. Dempsey (2002). Terrorism and the Constitution: Sacrificing Civil Liberties in the Name of National Security. Los Angeles: The New Press. ISBN 1-56584-782-2. OCLC 50558833.
- Cole, David (2003). Enemy Aliens: Double Standards and Constitutional Freedoms in the War on Terrorism. New York City: The New Press. ISBN 1-56584-800-4. OCLC 52001716.
- Cole, David (January–February 2009). "Closing Guantánamo: The problem of preventive detention". Boston Review. 34 (1).
- Cole, David (2009). The Torture Memos: Rationalizing the Unthinkable. New York City: The New Press. p. 304. ISBN 978-1-59558-492-2.
- Cole, David (March 29, 2016). Engines of Liberty: The Power of Citizen Activists to Make Constitutional Law. Basic Books. ISBN 978-0465060900. OCLC 1005838743.

== Personal life ==
Cole is married to former Georgetown Law professor and current D.C. Circuit Court of Appeals judge Nina Pillard. They have two children, Sarah and Aidan Pillard.
