= 1984 Republican National Convention =

Political convention of the Republican Party

- 1984 presidential election

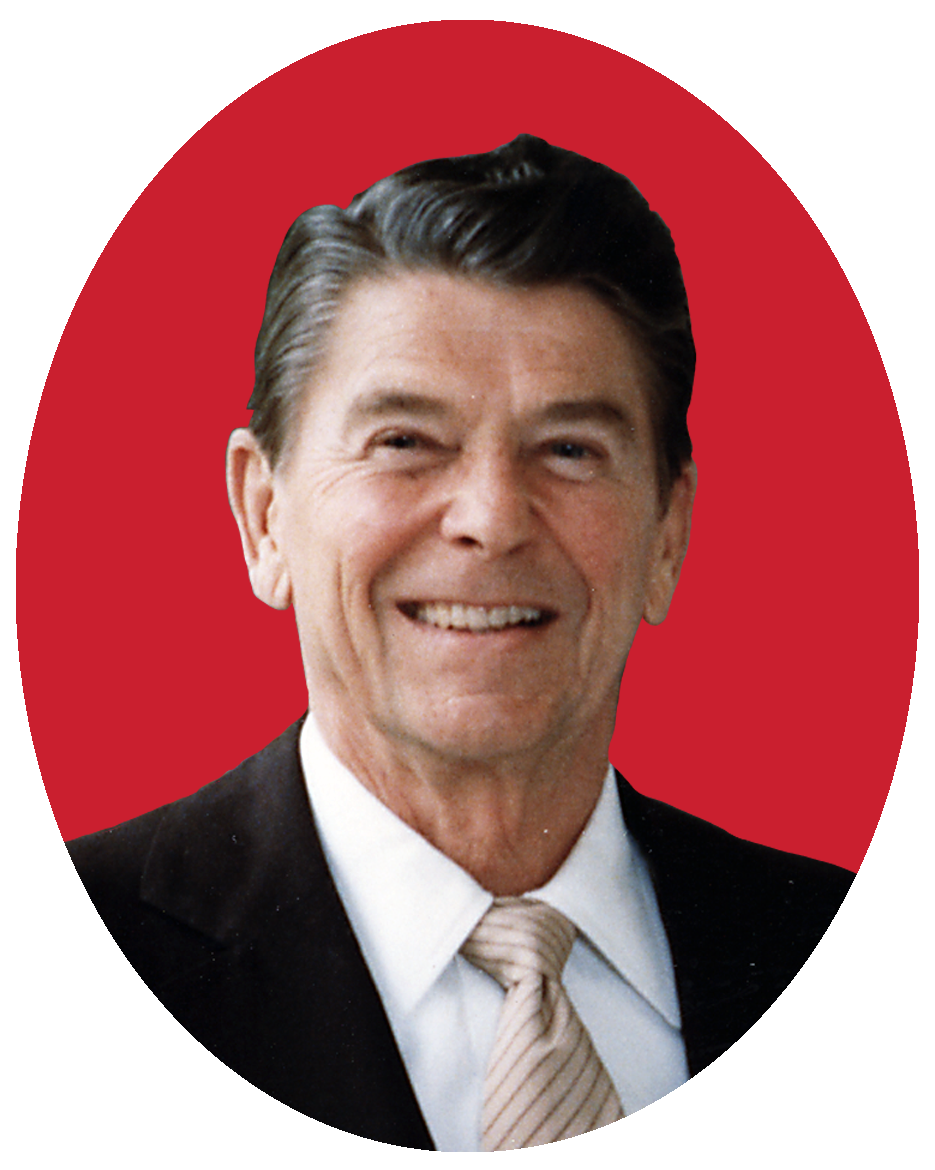
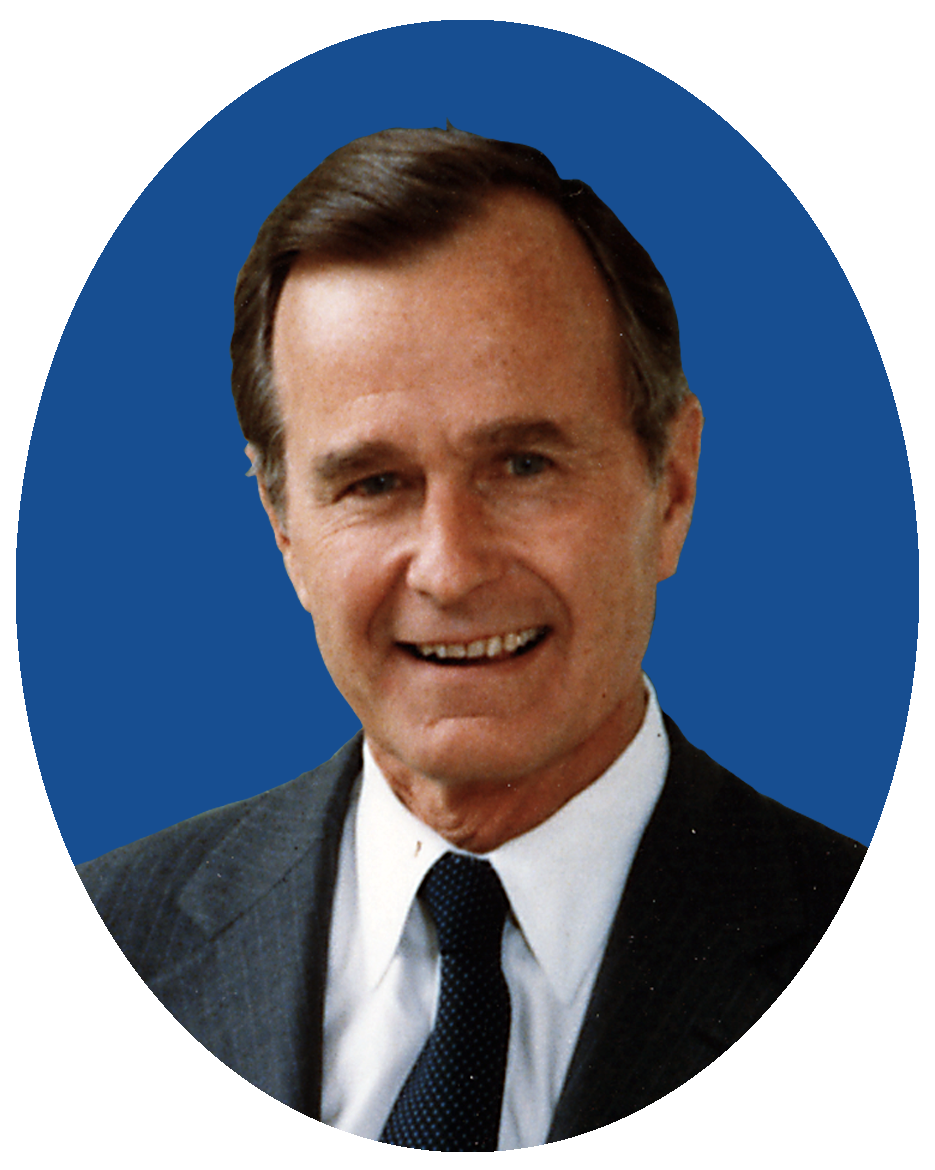
- Nominees; Reagan and Bush

Convention
- Dates: August 20–23, 1984
- City: Dallas, Texas
- Venue: Dallas Convention Center
- Keynote speaker: Katherine D. Ortega

Candidates
- Presidential nominee: Ronald Reagan of California
- Vice-presidential nominee: George H. W. Bush of Texas

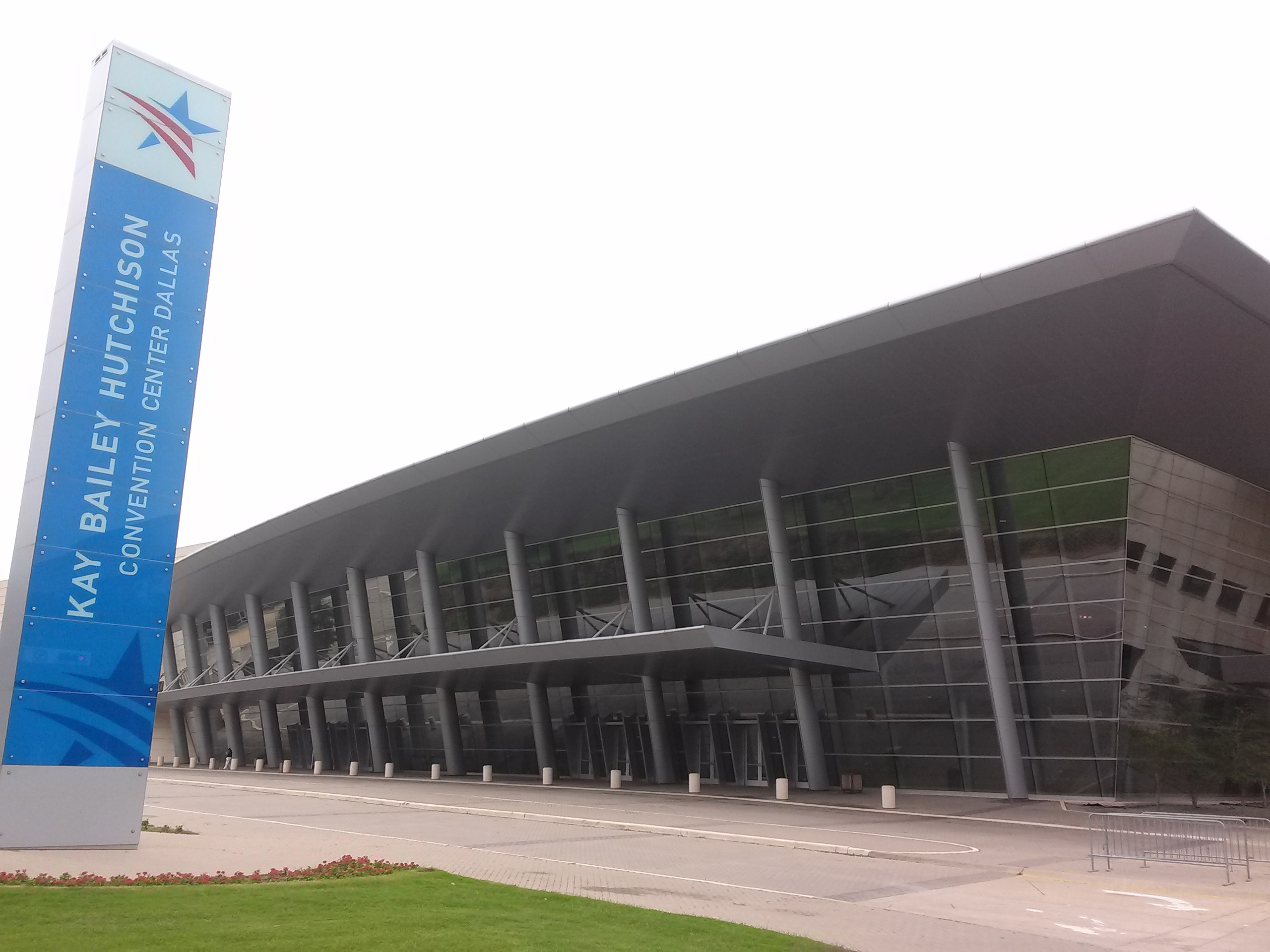
The Dallas Convention Center was the site of the 1984 Republican National Convention

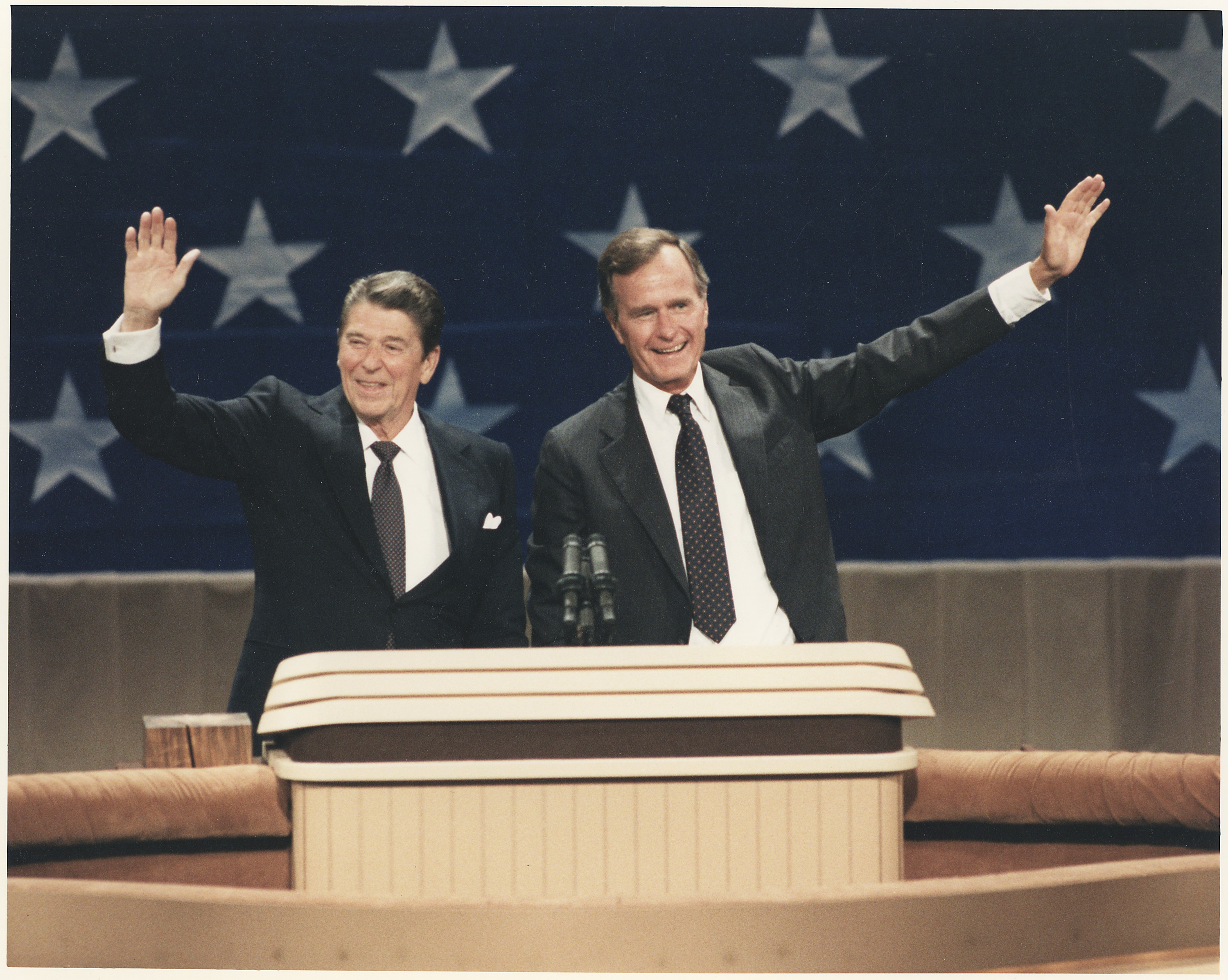
Reagan and Bush at the convention

The 1984 Republican National Convention convened on August 20 to August 23, 1984, at Dallas Convention Center in Downtown Dallas, Texas. The Republican National Convention nominated President Ronald Reagan and Vice President George H. W. Bush for reelection.

It was the thirty-third GOP presidential nominating convention, the first Republican convention held in Texas (the first Republican convention in the South outside Florida), and the only convention of either party held in Dallas.

Reagan's popularity had rebounded after the early 1980s recession, and he became the first incumbent president since Lyndon B. Johnson in 1964 to run without serious opposition in the Partisan primary. The keynote address on August 20 was delivered by Katherine Ortega, Treasurer of the United States. Other speakers included Elizabeth Dole, United States Secretary of Transportation; Jeane Kirkpatrick, U.S. Ambassador to the United Nations (who delivered her now-famous "Blame America First" speech); and Representative Jack Kemp of Buffalo, New York.

The convention also included a valedictory address by U.S. Senator Barry Goldwater of Arizona, who would retire in 1987. Goldwater was widely credited as the political founder of the New Right in the United States, of which Reagan was the political heir, and Reagan had gained notice for his "A Time for Choosing" speech supporting Goldwater in October 1964. Vice President George H.W. Bush gave a powerful address, some believing it debuted him as the de facto nominee of the GOP in 1988. President Reagan spoke after, and addressed the nation and the party on the future and highlighted the "Morning in America". Country singer Lee Greenwood was also featured, and sang "God Bless the U.S.A.," which had been released earlier that year.

== Site selection ==
In early 1982, bids to host the convention were received from Dallas and several other cities, including Houston, Kansas City, and San Francisco. President Reagan had made it known that he preferred the party meet in Dallas, and the party selected accordingly. The choice of Dallas was finalized on June 18, 1982, by a voice vote of the Republican National Committee. Dallas Mayor Jack Wilson Evans pledged that the Dallas Convention Center would be a sufficient venue and that the Dallas-Fort Worth area would be able to provide 29,000 hotel rooms for the convention.

== Nomination tallies ==
The Balloting:

| Candidates | |
| Name | Ronald W. Reagan |
| Certified Votes | 2,044 (100%) |
| total: | 2,044 |

To save time, the vice presidential vote was held simultaneously, with Vice President Bush receiving 2,042 votes and Jack Kemp and Anne Armstrong receiving one vote each. This would be the last vice presidential tally at a Republican Convention during the 20th century.

== Security ==
The Dallas Police Department, under Police Chief Billy Prince, was charged with providing security for the convention, including that of the delegates, President Ronald Reagan, and Vice President George H.W. Bush. Security planning, preparations and training for the event began in the police department a year in advance of the convention. President Reagan and Vice President Bush were scheduled to be housed in separate towers of the Anatole Hotel complex near downtown. Key commanders of the security plan included:

- Convention Security Commander - Assistant Chief Leslie Sweet
- Field Operations Commander - Deputy Chief William Newman
- Headquarters Hotel Commander - Captain Doug Sword
- Intelligence Commander - Captain Greg Holliday
- Convention Center Commander - Captain Dwight Walker
- Detention Services Commander - Captain Frank Hearron
- Dignitary Protection Commander - Captain John Holt
- Traffic Control Commander - Captain T.D. Tolleson
- Demonstration Management Commander - Captain Ray Hawkins
- Support Services Commander - Captain John Squier
- Presidential Hotel Response Team Commander - Lieutenant Rick Stone

The only incident of any consequence to occur during the convention was when the Yippies made headlines. On Wednesday, August 22, 1984, a group of protesters calling itself the "Corporate War Chest Tour" conducted a minor theft and vandalism spree against businesses in downtown Dallas. Under the security plan, various police response teams were mobilized consisting primarily of the Demonstration Management teams under the command of Captain Hawkins and the Presidential Hotel Response Teams, commanded by Lieutenant Stone, which were held in reserve on the eastern perimeter of downtown. Dozens of protesters were peacefully arrested including, Revolutionary Communist Youth Brigade member Gregory Lee Johnson, who burned a U.S. flag, which had been stolen from a flagpole in front of a downtown building. Johnson was charged with Desecration of Venerated Object, a misdemeanor violation of the Texas Penal Code. He was later convicted and his conviction was upheld at the state level. Johnson appealed the conviction to the federal courts, arguing that burning the flag was protected by the First Amendment to the United States Constitution. The case of Texas v. Johnson was appealed to the United States Supreme Court, which ruled on June 21, 1989, in Johnson's favor and invalidated flag desecration statutes throughout the country.

== See also ==
- 1984 Republican Party presidential primaries
- History of the United States Republican Party
- List of Republican National Conventions
- United States presidential nominating convention
- 1983 Libertarian National Convention
- 1984 Democratic National Convention
- 1984 United States presidential election
- Ronald Reagan 1984 presidential campaign
- 2026 Republican National Convention —midterm-year convention held in the same city

| Preceded by 1980; Detroit, Michigan | Republican National Conventions | Succeeded by 1988; New Orleans, Louisiana |
