= Flag Protection Act of 2005 =

Act proposed in US in 2005

- Long title: Flag Protection Act of 2005
- Announced in: the 109th United States Congress
- Sponsored by: Bob Bennett (R-UT); Co-Sponsor: Hillary Clinton (D-NY)
- Number of co-sponsors: 4

Legislative history
- Introduced in the Senate as S.1911 by Bob Bennett (R-UT) and Hillary Clinton (D-NY) on October 24, 2005

The Flag Protection Act of 2005 was a proposed United States federal law introduced in the United States Senate at the 109th United States Congress on October 24, 2005, by Senator Bob Bennett (R-UT) and co-sponsored by Senator Hillary Clinton (D-NY). Later co-sponsors included Barbara Boxer (D-CA), Mark Pryor (D-AR) and Thomas Carper (D-DE).

The law would have prohibited burning or otherwise destroying and damaging the US flag with the primary purpose of intimidation or inciting immediate violence or for the act of terrorism. It called for a punishment of no more than one year in prison and a fine of no more than $100,000; unless that flag was property of the United States Government, in which case the penalty would be a fine of not more than $250,000, not more than two years in prison, or both.

The nonpartisan Congressional Research Service summarized the act as follows:

Amends the federal criminal code to revise provisions regarding desecration of the flag to prohibit: (1) destroying or damaging a U.S. flag with the primary purpose and intent to incite or produce imminent violence or a breach of the peace; (2) intentionally threatening or intimidating any person, or group of persons, by burning a U.S. flag; or (3) stealing or knowingly converting the use of a U.S. flag belonging to the United States, or belonging to another person on U.S. lands, and intentionally destroying or damaging that flag.

Although the Supreme Court ruled in Texas v. Johnson (1989) that flag-burning was protected by the First Amendment, the bill was intended, according to The New York Times, to take the issue back to the Supreme Court, which was more conservative in 2005 than it was in 1989, in order to overturn that earlier decision. Since the law was not passed or even considered by the United States Congress, its constitutionality was never challenged in the Supreme Court.
