= United States v. Eichman =

1990 US Supreme Court flag-burning case

- Supreme Court of the United States

Argued May 14, 1990 Decided June 11, 1990
- Full case name: United States v. Shawn D. Eichman, David Gerald Blalock and Scott W. Tyler; United States v. Mark John Haggerty, Carlos Garza, Jennifer Proctor Campbell and Darius Allen Strong
- Citations: 496 U.S. 310 (more) 110 S. Ct. 2404; 110 L. Ed. 2d 287
- Argument: Oral argument

Case history
- Prior: United States v. Eichman, 731 F. Supp. 1123 (D.D.C. 1990); United States v. Haggerty, 731 F. Supp. 415 (W.D. Wash. 1990); consolidated, probable jurisdiction noted, 494 U.S. 1063 (1990).

Holding
- The interest on the part of the government to protect the American flag as a symbol did not outweigh the individual right to disparage that symbol through expressive conduct. The Flag Protection Act of 1989 is unconstitutional.

Court membership
- Chief Justice William Rehnquist Associate Justices William J. Brennan Jr. · Byron White; Thurgood Marshall · Harry Blackmun; John P. Stevens · Sandra Day O'Connor; Antonin Scalia · Anthony Kennedy

Case opinions
- Majority: Brennan, joined by Marshall, Blackmun, Scalia, Kennedy
- Dissent: Stevens, joined by Rehnquist, White, O'Connor

Laws applied
- U.S. Const. amend. I; Flag Protection Act

United States v. Eichman, 496 U.S. 310 (1990), was a United States Supreme Court case that by a 5–4 decision invalidated a federal law against flag desecration as a violation of free speech under the First Amendment. It was argued together with United States v. Haggerty. It built on the Court's decision the prior year in Texas v. Johnson (1989), which invalidated on First Amendment grounds a Texas statute banning flag burning.

== Background ==
In response to Texas v. Johnson, the 101st Congress passed the Flag Protection Act of 1989, which attempted to circumvent the Johnson ruling by prohibiting mistreatment of the flag without regard to any message being conveyed. On the day that the law took effect, protests were staged around the nation. Demonstrators at two of these incidents, in Seattle and Washington, D.C., were arrested and charged under the revised statute.

In Seattle, flags were burned at a demonstration organized by Vietnam Veterans Against the War outside the Capitol Hill post office shortly after midnight, moments after the law took effect. No one was arrested during the demonstration, but four people identified from photographs were later charged with violating the federal Flag Protection Act of 1989: Mark Haggerty, Jennifer Campbell, Darius Strong and Carlos Garza. None of the four were members or supporters of VVAW-AI or the Revolutionary Communist Party. None of the four had been among the organizers of the demonstration or had previously known each other.

In Washington, D.C., Gregory Lee Johnson, the defendant in Texas v. Johnson, staged a protest together with three companions – artists Dread Scott and Shawn Eichman and Vietnam veteran David Blalock – by burning flags on the steps of the United States Capitol building before a crowd of reporters and photographers. Scott had recently aroused controversy with a "flag on the floor" exhibit at the Art Institute of Chicago. Eichman was a member of the Coalition Opposed to Censorship in the Arts, and Blalock was a member of the Vietnam Veterans Against the War Anti-Imperialist. All four were supporters of the Revolutionary Communist Party and/or the Revolutionary Communist Youth Brigade. On the day of the protest they released a statement calling for others to express opposition to "compulsory patriotism" by burning the flag.

In both cases, federal district judges in Seattle and Washington, D.C. dismissed charges brought against the protesters, citing Texas v. Johnson. U.S. attorneys appealed the decisions directly to the Supreme Court. Because the Flag Protection Act called for expedited review, the two cases were consolidated into United States v. Eichman (1990), which would serve as a test case for the amended statute.

== Opinion of the Court ==
In a 5–4 decision by Justice Brennan joined by Marshall, Blackmun, Scalia, and Kennedy, with Stevens, Chief Justice Rehnquist, White, and O'Connor dissenting (the same as in Texas v. Johnson), the Court held that the federal government, like the states, cannot prosecute a person for desecration of a United States flag, because to do so would be inconsistent with the First Amendment. The Government conceded that desecration of the flag constitutes expressive conduct and enjoys the First Amendment's full protection. It is clear that the "Government's asserted interest" in protecting the "physical integrity" of a privately owned flag in order "to preserve the flag's status as a symbol of the Nation" and certain national ideals, is related to the suppression, and concerned with the content, of free expression.

The majority wrote that mere destruction or disfigurement of a symbol's physical manifestation does not diminish or otherwise affect the symbol itself. The Government's interest is implicated only when a person's "treatment of the flag communicates a message" to others that is inconsistent with the identified ideals of the flag. The precise language of the Act's prohibitions confirms Congress' interest in the communicative impact of flag destruction, since each of the specified terms – with the possible exception of "burns" – unmistakably connotes disrespectful treatment of the flag and suggests a "focus on those acts likely to damage the flag's symbolic value." This is further supported by the Act's explicit exemption for disposal of worn or soiled flags, which the Act protects from prosecution since disposing a worn or soiled flag does not desecrate the flag's symbolic nature. Thus, the Act is struck down as its restriction on expressive conduct cannot "be justified without reference to the content of the regulated speech." It must therefore be subjected to "the most exacting scrutiny," which cannot justify its infringement on First Amendment rights. While flag desecration – like virulent ethnic and religious epithets, vulgar repudiations of the draft, and scurrilous caricatures – is deeply offensive to many, "the Government may not prohibit the expression of an idea simply because society finds the idea itself offensive or disagreeable."

== Subsequent developments ==
On remand, Eichman's case was dismissed, as she and her fellow defendants had only been charged with flag desecration. However, the defendants in the Haggerty case had faced an additional charge of destruction of government property, as the burned flag was alleged to have been stolen from Seattle's Capitol Hill Post Office. On those charges, all four Seattle defendants pleaded guilty and were fined. Carlos Garza and Darius Strong each served three days in jail.

When Republicans retook control of Congress in 1995 for the 104th session, the Flag Desecration Amendment was first proposed, which would grant the federal government the authority to proscribe flag burning. A resolution for this Amendment passed the House in every session from the 104th until the 109th Congress, but never got past the Senate (in the most recent vote in 2006 it failed by one vote 66–34), and has not been considered since.

On August 25, 2025, President Donald Trump signed Executive Order 14341^{[ws]}, titled "Prosecuting Burning of the American Flag", ordering "[t]he Attorney General shall prioritize the enforcement to the fullest extent possible of our Nation's criminal and civil laws against acts of American Flag desecration that violate applicable, content-neutral laws, while causing harm unrelated to expression, consistent with the First Amendment," and "[t]he Secretary of State, the Attorney General, and the Secretary of Homeland Security, acting within their respective authorities, shall deny, prohibit, terminate, or revoke visas, residence permits, naturalization proceedings, and other immigration benefits, or seek removal from the United States, pursuant to Federal law [...] whenever there has been an appropriate determination that foreign nationals have engaged in American Flag-desecration activity under circumstances that permit the exercise of such remedies pursuant to Federal law." The text of the order acknowledges the findings of Texas v. Johnson, but omits acknowledgement of United States v. Eichman. Executive Order 14341 was published and catalogued August 28.

== See also ==
- List of United States Supreme Court cases, volume 496
- Flag desecration
- Street v. New York
