= Texas v. Johnson =

1989 U.S. Supreme Court case concerning free speech

- Supreme Court of the United States

Argued March 21, 1989 Decided June 21, 1989
- Full case name: Texas v. Gregory L. Johnson
- Citations: 491 U.S. 397 (more) 109 S. Ct. 2533; 105 L. Ed. 2d 342; 1989 U.S. LEXIS 3115; 57 U.S.L.W. 4770
- Argument: Oral argument

Case history
- Prior: Defendant convicted, Dallas County Criminal Court; affirmed, 706 S.W.2d 120 (Tex. App. 1986); reversed and remanded for dismissal, 755 S.W.2d 92 (Tex. Crim. App. 1988); cert. granted, 488 U.S. 884 (1988).

Holding
- Gregory Lee Johnson's conviction was inconsistent with the First Amendment. Any statute that criminalizes the desecration of the American flag is unconstitutional. Texas Court of Criminal Appeals affirmed.

Court membership
- Chief Justice William Rehnquist Associate Justices William J. Brennan Jr. · Byron White; Thurgood Marshall · Harry Blackmun; John P. Stevens · Sandra Day O'Connor; Antonin Scalia · Anthony Kennedy

Case opinions
- Majority: Brennan, joined by Marshall, Blackmun, Scalia, Kennedy
- Concurrence: Kennedy
- Dissent: Rehnquist, joined by White, O'Connor
- Dissent: Stevens

Laws applied
- U.S. Const. amends. I, XIV; Desecration of a Venerated Object, Tex. Penal Code § 42.09(a)(3)(1989) (Note: As of its most recent revision on September 1, 2007, Texas Penal Code § 42.09 now refers to cruelty to livestock animals, where Penal Code § 42.11(2007) refers to the destruction of the flag.)

Texas v. Johnson, 491 U.S. 397 (1989), is a landmark decision by the Supreme Court of the United States in which the Court held, 5–4, that burning the flag of the United States is protected speech under the First Amendment to the U.S. Constitution, as doing so counts as symbolic speech and political speech.

Activist Gregory Lee Johnson was convicted for burning an American flag during a protest outside the 1984 Republican National Convention in Dallas, Texas, and was fined $2,000 and sentenced to one year in jail in accordance with Texas law. Justice William Brennan wrote for the five-justice majority that Johnson's flag burning was protected under freedom of speech, and therefore the state could not censor Johnson nor punish him for his actions.

The ruling invalidated laws against desecrating the American flag, which at the time were enforced in 48 of the 50 states. The ruling was unpopular with the general public and lawmakers, with President George H. W. Bush calling flag burning "dead wrong". The ruling was challenged by Congress, which passed the Flag Protection Act later that year, making flag desecration a federal crime. The law's constitutionality was contested before the Supreme Court, which again affirmed in United States v. Eichman (1990) that flag burning was a protected form of free speech and struck down the Flag Protection Act as violating the First Amendment. In the years following the ruling, Congress several times considered the Flag Desecration Amendment, which would have amended the U.S. Constitution to make flag burning illegal, but never passed it. The issue of flag burning remained controversial decades later, and it is still used as a form of protest.

Time magazine described Texas v. Johnson as one of the best Supreme Court decisions since 1960, with legal scholars since stating that "Freedom of speech applies to symbolic expression, such as displaying flags, burning flags, wearing armbands, burning crosses, and the like."

== Background ==
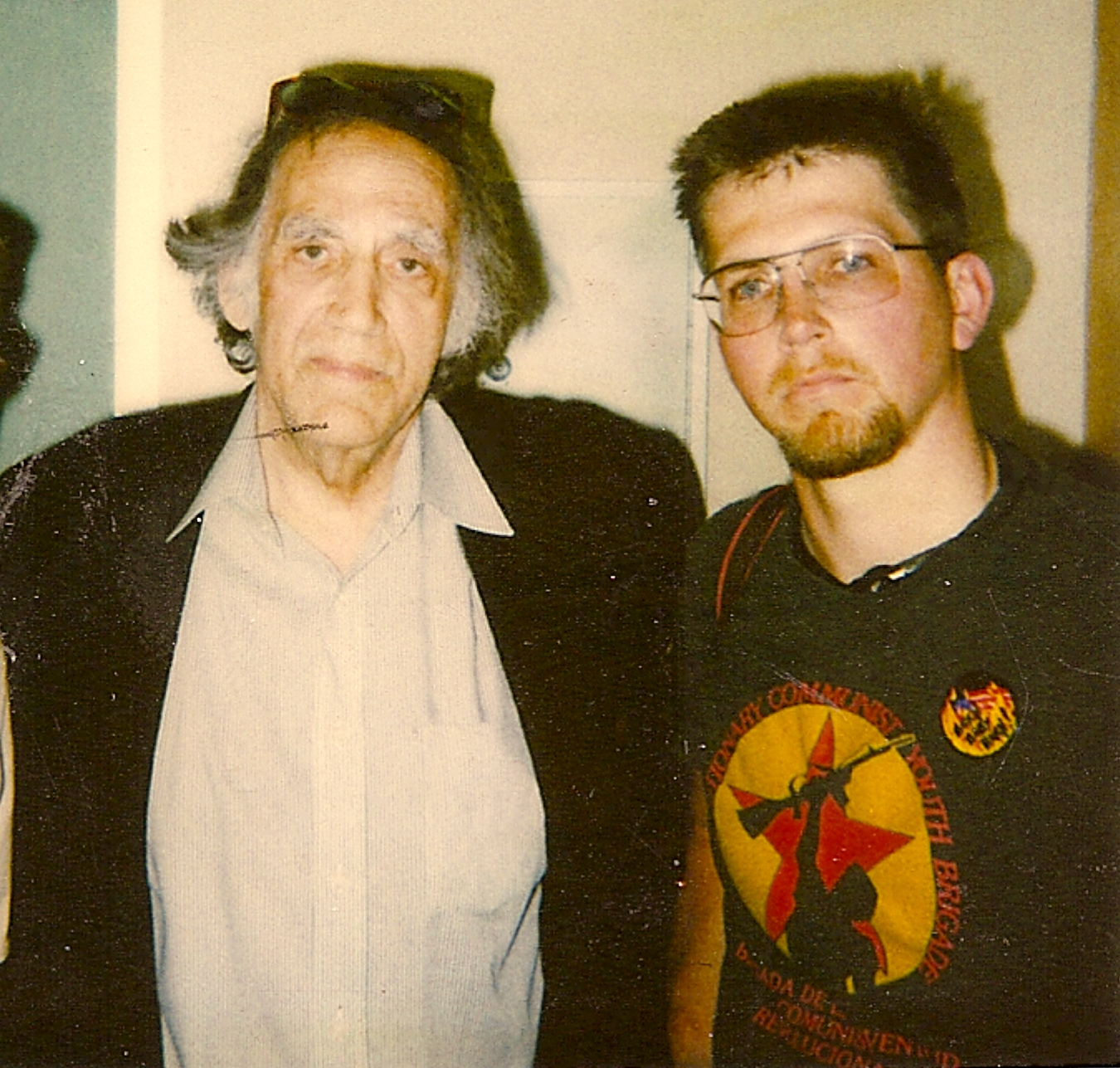
Johnson (right) with attorney Kunstler, c. 1989

On August 22, 1984, Gregory Lee Johnson, a member of the Revolutionary Communist Youth Brigade, participated in a political demonstration during the 1984 Republican National Convention in Dallas, Texas, protesting the policies of the Reagan administration. The protestors marched through the streets, chanting political slogans and staging "die-ins" at several corporate buildings to dramatize the effects of nuclear war. Several protestors occasionally stopped to spray-paint walls and knock over potted plants, although Johnson himself took no part in those actions. At the Mercantile Bank Building, protestors removed the American flag from the flagpole outside. An unidentified protestor handed the flag to Johnson, who hid it under his shirt.

When the protestors reached Dallas City Hall, Johnson poured kerosene on the flag and set it on fire. During the burning of the flag, protestors shouted phrases such as, "America, the red, white, and blue, we spit on you, you stand for plunder, you will go under." No one was injured during the demonstration, though some witnesses to the flag burning felt deeply offended. Johnson was arrested within a half-hour of igniting the flag, and an additional one hundred protestors were arrested "without any resistance". One spectator, a Korean War veteran named Daniel Walker, gathered the remains of the flag and buried them in the backyard of his home in Fort Worth. (Note: For his actions, Walker was awarded the highest civilian honor in the U.S. Army and received a letter from Ronald Reagan.)

Johnson was charged with violating the Texas flag desecration statute, which prohibited the vandalism of respected or venerated objects. Johnson was the only individual at the protest to be criminally charged. Also, he was initially indicted on one count of disorderly conduct, but that charge was eventually dropped. On December 13, 1984, a six-person jury found Johnson guilty of flag desecration, and he was subsequently sentenced to one year in jail and fined $2,000. Johnson appealed his conviction to the Fifth Court of Appeals of Texas, but was again found criminally liable. He then appealed to the Texas Court of Criminal Appeals, which overruled his conviction, finding that his First Amendment rights had been violated. That court found that Johnson's actions were symbolic speech protected by the First Amendment, writing that: "a government cannot mandate by fiat a feeling of unity in its citizens. Therefore that very same government cannot carve out a symbol of unity and prescribe a set of approved messages to be associated with that symbol." The Texas Court of Criminal Appeals also affirmed that his actions did not constitute a breach of the peace.

Texas filed a writ of certiorari asking the U.S. Supreme Court to review the case, which was granted in 1988.

== Opinion of the Court ==
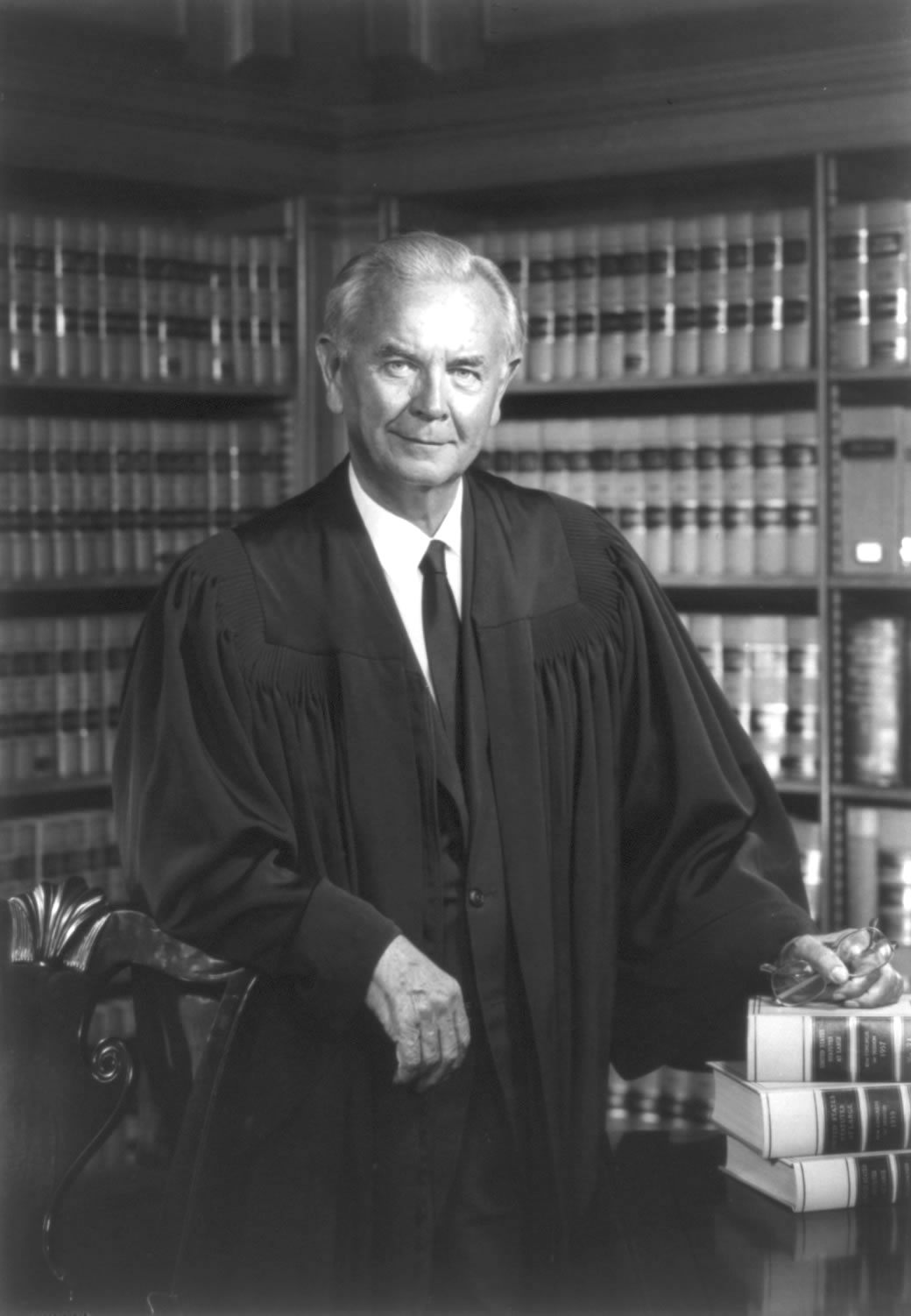
William J. Brennan, Jr. wrote for the Court's majority.

Oral arguments were held on March 21, 1989. David D. Cole and William Kunstler argued the case on behalf of Gregory Lee Johnson, and Kathi Alyce Drew argued on behalf of the state of Texas. During oral arguments, the state defended its statute on two grounds: first, states had a compelling interest in preserving a venerated national symbol; and second, the state had a compelling interest in preventing breaches of peace. The Supreme Court handed down a 5–4 opinion on June 21, 1989 in favor of Johnson. Justice William Brennan authored a majority opinion which Justices Thurgood Marshall, Harry Blackmun, Antonin Scalia, and Anthony Kennedy joined. Kennedy also authored a separate concurring opinion.

In the majority opinion, Brennan reiterated the Court's long-held recognition that the First Amendment to the United States Constitution protects non-speech acts as being symbolic speech, writing that the First Amendment's protection on speech "does not end at the spoken or written word". The Court recognized flags as being vessels for symbolic speech in Stromberg v. California (1931), in which the Court overruled the conviction of a youth camp worker who displayed a red flag at the camp. Brennan also invoked Tinker v. Des Moines Independent Community School District (1969), in which the Court recognized the wearing of a black armband as a form of speech, to demonstrate the Court's history of recognizing symbolic actions as protected speech. The Court would then analyze whether Johnson's actions could be considered symbolic speech, which would allow him to challenge his conviction by invoking the First Amendment.

In Spence v. Washington (1974), the Court rejected "the view that an apparently limitless variety of conduct can be labeled 'speech' whenever the person engaging in the conduct intends thereby to express an idea," but acknowledged that conduct may be "sufficiently imbued with elements of communication to fall within the scope of the First and Fourteenth Amendments." To determine whether a particular act possesses the elements of "speech" required to invoke the First Amendment, the Court asked whether "an intent to convey a particularized message was present, and [whether] the likelihood was great that the message would be understood by those who viewed it." The Court found, based on Spence, that Johnson's burning of the flag "constituted expressive conduct, permitting him to invoke the First Amendment." Brennan wrote that the political nature of the flag burning was "both intentional and overwhelmingly apparent," having coincided with the Republican National Convention.

The Court rejected the argument that Johnson was liable for a breach of the peace, writing that, "no disturbance of the peace actually occurred or threatened to occur because Johnson burned the flag." While the State of Texas argued that flag burning is punishable on the basis that it "tends to incite" breaches of the peace, the Court disagreed, finding that flag burning does not necessarily lead to breaches of the peace. Citing Brandenburg v. Ohio (1969), Brennan wrote that the state may only punish speech that would incite "imminent lawless action", and rejected the notion that flag burning constituted such.

=== Kennedy's concurrence ===
Justice Anthony Kennedy filed a concurring opinion in which he acknowledged the potentially unpopular nature of the holding, but affirmed that the role of the Supreme Court is to uphold the integrity of the Constitution, even if "sometimes we must make decisions we do not like." Kennedy continued:

I agree that the flag holds a lonely place of honor in an age when absolutes are distrusted and simple truths are burdened by unneeded apologetics. With all respect to those views, I do not believe the Constitution gives us the right to rule as the dissenting Members of the Court urge, however painful this judgment is to announce. Though symbols often are what we ourselves make of them, the flag is constant in expressing beliefs Americans share, beliefs in law and peace, and that freedom which sustains the human spirit. The case here today forces recognition of the costs to which those beliefs commit us. It is poignant but fundamental that the flag protects those who hold it in contempt.

=== Rehnquist's dissent ===
Chief Justice William H. Rehnquist wrote a dissenting opinion, joined by Justices Byron White and Sandra Day O'Connor. Rehnquist argued that the "unique position" of the flag "justifies a governmental prohibition against flag burning in the way respondent Johnson did here." Rehnquist discussed the significance of the flag as applied throughout American history, such as during the colonial era, the War of 1812, and the Civil War, writing that burning a symbol of national unification was distinctly separate from other political demonstrations where freedom of speech might protect protestors. Rehnquist wrote:

The American flag, then, throughout more than 200 years of our history, has come to be the visible symbol embodying our Nation. It does not represent the views of any particular political party, and it does not represent any particular political philosophy. The flag is not simply another "idea" or "point of view" competing for recognition in the marketplace of ideas. Millions and millions of Americans regard it with an almost mystical reverence regardless of what sort of social, political, or philosophical beliefs they may have. I cannot agree that the First Amendment invalidates the Act of Congress, and the laws of 48 of the 50 States, which make criminal the public burning of the flag.

Rehnquist invoked several previous rulings by the Court that showed a recognition of the flag as a unique national symbol, including Halter v. Nebraska (1907) in which Justice John Marshall Harlan opined: "For that flag every true American has not simply an appreciation, but a deep affection." However, the Johnson majority found a lack of evidence in the Constitution that implied that the flag should be held in a position of "uniqueness". Brennan answered this claim directly in a response to Rehnquist's dissent.

Rehnquist further argued that Johnson's burning of the flag did not constitute expressive conduct, writing that flag burning is "no essential part of any exposition of ideas", but rather "the equivalent of an inarticulate grunt or roar that, it seems fair to say, is most likely to be indulged in not to express any particular idea, but to antagonize others". He opined that the Texas statute was a reasonable restriction only on how Johnson's idea was expressed, leaving Johnson with "a full panoply of other symbols and every conceivable form of verbal expression to express his deep disapproval of national policy".

=== Stevens's dissent ===
Justice John Paul Stevens also wrote a dissenting opinion. Stevens argued for the cultural importance of the flag and all that it stands for, more broadly than just as a symbol of national unity. He wrote of the flag:

It is a symbol of freedom, of equal opportunity, of religious tolerance, and of goodwill for other peoples who share our aspirations. The symbol carries its message to dissidents both at home and abroad who may have no interest at all in our national unity or survival. The value of the flag as a symbol cannot be measured. Even so, I have no doubt that the interest in preserving that value for the future is both significant and legitimate. Conceivably, that value will be enhanced by the Court's conclusion that our national commitment to free expression is so strong that even the United States, as ultimate guarantor of that freedom, is without power to prohibit the desecration of its unique symbol. But I am unpersuaded.

Stevens compared public desecration of the flag to posting bulletin boards on the Washington Monument, writing that such behavior "might enlarge the market for free expression, but at a cost I would not pay". He asserted that Johnson was not punished for his opinion but rather for the way he chose to express it.

== Subsequent developments ==
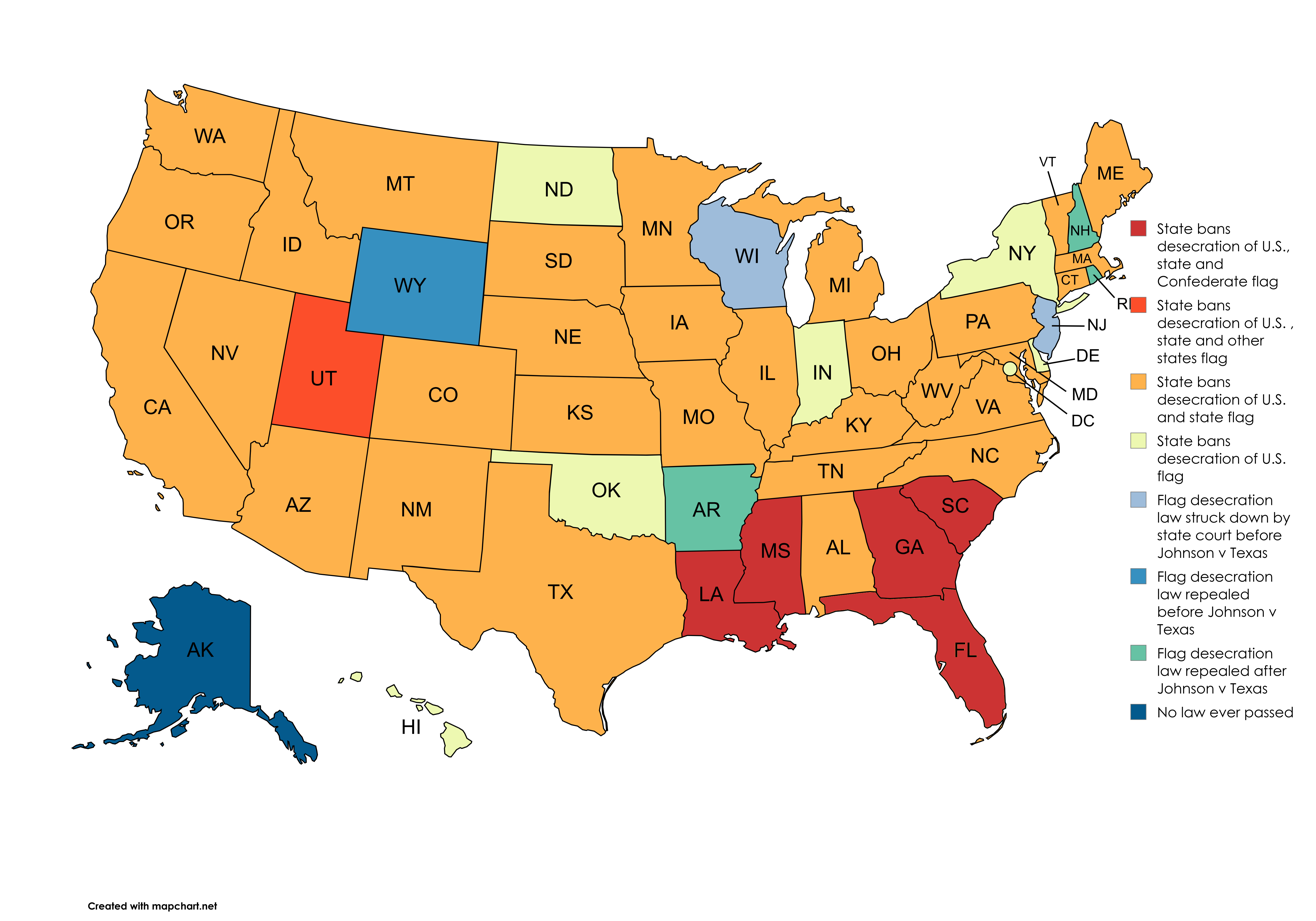
Maps of flag desecration laws in the United States, unenforcable since Texas v. Johnson

=== Public reaction ===
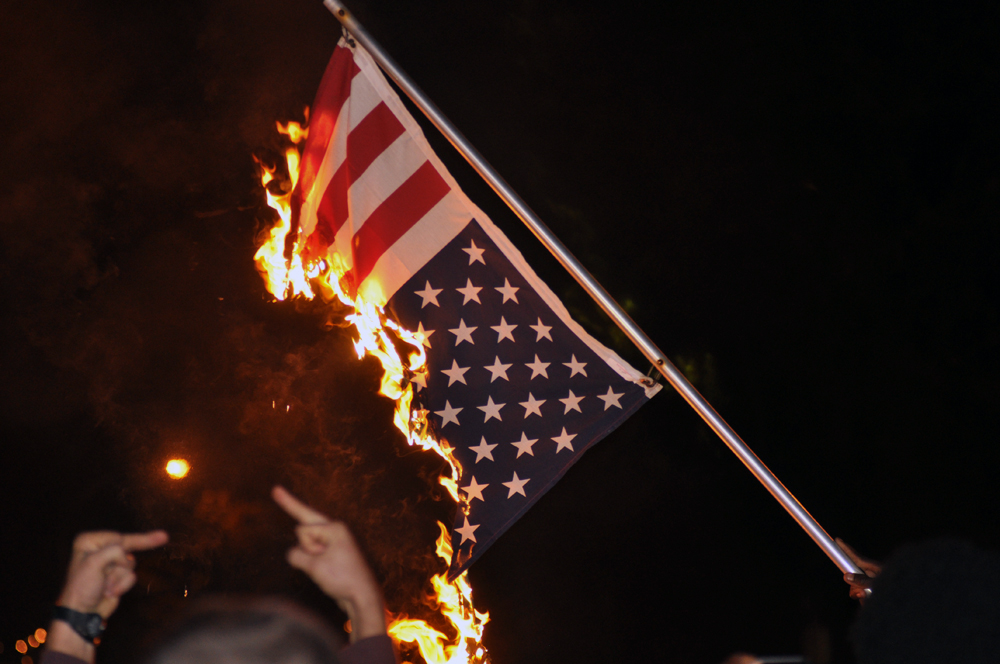
Protestors burn the American flag during the Ferguson unrest, 2014

The ruling was unpopular among Americans and drew overwhelming criticism from the public. Legal scholar Geoffrey R. Stone remarked that the ruling was "wildly unpopular" with the American people, and Newsweek described a sense of "stunned outrage" across the country. In a nationwide public opinion poll taken shortly after the ruling, 75 percent of respondents disagreed with the decision, and nearly two-thirds supported the idea of a constitutional amendment to protect the flag. Polls taken by the National Opinion Research Center showed a decline in respondents expressing "a great deal of confidence" in the Court, dropping from 34 percent before the ruling to 17 percent after. However, confidence levels might have been influenced by the Court's ruling in Webster v. Reproductive Health Services two weeks after Johnson.

At a rally to raise support for the Flag Desecration Amendment, Senator Bob Dole (R-KS) said: "Americans may not know every nuance of Constitutional law. But they knew desecration when they see it. They're demanding action." In a statement to the Senate on July 18, 1989, Senator Strom Thurmond (R-SC) said that the ruling "opened an emotional hydrant across our country demanding immediate action". On October 4, 1989, Senator Trent Lott (R-MS) told the Senate that while visiting constituents in Mississippi, he "heard outrage" in "city after city", and claimed that several people he witnessed were "in tears over the decision".

While initial support for the Flag Desecration Amendment was high among Americans, with a Newsweek poll indicating 71 percent of Americans agreed with such an idea, public support for the amendment waned by the following month. By late July, Senate Majority Leader George J. Mitchell (D-ME) reported his constituents were "equally divided" between those who supported a new amendment and those who supported the Johnson ruling. Public opinion polls by Gallup show a downward trend in respondents supporting the amendment, from 71 percent in favor in 1989 to 68 percent in 1990, to 55 percent in 2005. A 2006 CNN poll showed similar figures, with 56 percent of respondents in favor and 40 percent opposed. A 2006 Pew Research poll reported only 49 percent of respondents listing a flag burning amendment as "very important".

The issue of flag burning remained controversial decades later. Protestors around the country continue to burn the flag as a form of anti-government protest, including during the Ferguson unrest in 2014, during the George Floyd protests in 2020, and during the abortion protests in 2022. Polling conducted in 2020 by YouGov indicated that 49 percent of Americans believed flag burning should be illegal, and a later 2023 poll by YouGov showed that 59 percent of respondents believed flag burning to be "always unacceptable".

=== Legislative history ===
The Court's ruling invalidated laws against desecrating the American flag, which at the time were enforced in every state except Alaska and Wyoming. On June 22, 1989, one day after the ruling, the Senate passed a resolution to express "profound disappointment" in the Court's decision by a vote of 97-3. On June 27, the House of Representatives passed a resolution expressing "profound concern" with the decision by a vote of 411-5. President George H. W. Bush was also strongly opposed to the ruling, calling flag burning "dead wrong". Bush asked Congress to supersede Johnson by passing a new constitutional amendment to outlaw flag burning. On June 30, Bush spoke before a crowd at the Iwo Jima Memorial in Washington, D.C. to express his distaste for the Court's decision, urging Congress to act quickly. On September 12, the House of Representatives passed a resolution that came to be known as the Flag Protection Act of 1989, which made it a federal crime to desecrate the flag in any way, including burning it. The bill passed the Senate on October 5, and was enacted into law without Bush's signature. The law was immediately challenged in court by Gregory Lee Johnson. In United States v. Eichman (1990), the Court once again upheld that flag burning was protected speech under the First Amendment, with the same five justices in Johnson forming the majority. In an opinion also written by Justice Brennan, the Court declared the Flag Protection Act of 1989 unconstitutional and overruled it.

Since Eichman, Congress has considered the Flag Desecration Amendment several times, first by the 104th Congress in 1995, and most recently by the 109th Congress in 2006. The resolution passed the House of Representatives three times but has never passed in the Senate. The most recent measure passed the House of Representatives on June 22, 2005, but failed by one vote in the Senate on June 27, 2006. Interest in the Flag Desecration Amendment was revived in 2020 when President Donald Trump said during a rally in Tulsa, Oklahoma that he believed burning the flag should be punished with one year in jail. Trump later asked the Supreme Court to "reconsider" their flag burning rulings.

On July 20, 2016, Johnson was again arrested for burning the American flag during the Republican National Convention, which was being held in Cleveland, Ohio. Prosecutors dropped the charges in January 2017, and Cleveland agreed to pay Johnson $225,000 in settlements.

In August 2025, President Trump issued an executive order directing the Department of Justice to prosecute certain instances of flag burning under federal law, despite its First Amendment protection, by more stringently enforcing laws prohibiting the burning of items in public spaces. The order seeks to impose penalties including up to one year of imprisonment. Legal scholars noted that the directive is likely to face significant constitutional challenges due to the extent to which its motivation was content-based, and could return the question to the Supreme Court. Other scholars argued that the order exceeded presidential authority because the power to create criminal penalties rests with Congress and the states.

== See also ==
- Street v. New York
- List of United States Supreme Court cases
  - Lists of United States Supreme Court cases by volume
  - List of United States Supreme Court cases, volume 491
