= Flag Protection Act =

American law to prevent desecration of the national flag

Flag Protection Act of 1968
- Other short titles: Flag Desecration Penalties Act of 1968
- Long title: An Act to prohibit desecration of the flag and for other purposes.
- Enacted by: the 90th United States Congress
- Effective: July 5, 1968

Citations
- Public law: 90-381
- Statutes at Large: 82 Stat. 291

Codification
- Titles amended: 18 U.S.C.: Crimes and Criminal Procedure
- U.S.C. sections created: 18 U.S.C. § 700

Legislative history
- Introduced in the House as H.R. 10480; Passed the House on June 20, 1967 (387–16); Passed the Senate on June 24, 1968 (unanimous consent) with amendment; House agreed to Senate amendment on June 25, 1968 (without objection); Signed into law by President Lyndon B. Johnson on July 5, 1968

Major amendments
- Flag Protection Act of 1989 (Pub. L. 101–131)

United States Supreme Court cases
- United States v. Eichman, 496 U.S. 310 (1990)

The Flag Protection Act of 1968 (Pub. L. 90–381, 82 Stat. 291) is a United States federal law that made desecration of the U.S. flag a federal crime. It was passed by the 90th United States Congress in response to protests against the Vietnam War, and was codified at 18 U.S.C. § 700. The Act extended nationwide a 1947 law that had applied only to the District of Columbia.

After the Supreme Court ruled in Texas v. Johnson (1989) that flag burning is protected speech, Congress amended the law with the Flag Protection Act of 1989. The Supreme Court struck down the amended law in United States v. Eichman (1990).

== History ==
=== 1968 Act ===
The House passed H.R. 10480 by a vote of 387–16 on June 20, 1967. The Senate passed the bill by voice vote on June 24, 1968, and the House agreed to the Senate's amendments by voice vote. President Lyndon B. Johnson signed it into law on July 5, 1968.

For about two decades, critics challenged the law as a violation of the First Amendment. Lower courts continued to uphold it, and the Supreme Court declined to review those rulings.

=== 1989 amendment ===
In June 1989, the Supreme Court ruled 5–4 in Texas v. Johnson that burning the flag is expressive conduct protected by the First Amendment. The case concerned a Texas state law rather than the federal statute. In response, the 101st United States Congress passed the Flag Protection Act of 1989 (H.R. 2978), which rewrote 18 U.S.C. § 700 to remove the requirement that the defendant "cast contempt" on the flag and to punish physical acts against the flag regardless of the actor's motive. The House passed the bill 380–38 in September 1989, and the Senate passed it 91–9 on October 5, 1989.

President George H. W. Bush, who favored a constitutional amendment instead, said the bill was not "enough". In an October 26 statement, he said that because the law's constitutionality "must ultimately be decided by the courts", he would allow it to become law without his signature. It became Pub. L. 101–131 (103 Stat. 777) on October 28, 1989.

=== United States v. Eichman ===
On June 11, 1990, the Supreme Court ruled 5–4 in United States v. Eichman that prosecutions under the amended Act violated the First Amendment. The Court held that the government's interest in preserving the flag as a symbol did not outweigh an individual's right to desecrate it as a form of protest. Writing for the majority, Justice William Brennan stated that "punishing desecration of the flag dilutes the very freedom that makes this emblem so revered, and worth revering." Efforts to criminalize flag burning later shifted to a proposed constitutional amendment.

=== Aftermath ===
On August 25, 2025, President Donald Trump signed an executive order titled "Prosecuting Burning of the American Flag". Rather than relying on the Flag Protection Act, the order directs the Justice Department to prosecute flag desecration under content-neutral laws, such as those covering violent crimes or property damage, and acknowledges that the Supreme Court has held flag burning to be protected speech.

== Text ==
=== As enacted (1968) ===
Subsection (a) of the original Act provided:

Whoever knowingly casts contempt upon any flag of the United States by publicly mutilating, defacing, defiling, burning, or trampling upon it shall be fined not more than $1,000 or imprisoned for not more than one year, or both.

=== As amended (1989) ===
After the 1989 amendment, the section read:

- (a)
  - (1) Whoever knowingly mutilates, defaces, physically defiles, burns, maintains on the floor or ground, or tramples upon any flag of the United States shall be fined under this title or imprisoned for not more than one year, or both.
  - (2) This subsection does not prohibit any conduct consisting of the disposal of a flag when it has become worn or soiled.
- (b) As used in this section, the term "flag of the United States" means any flag of the United States, or any part thereof, made of any substance, of any size, in a form that is commonly displayed.
- (c) Nothing in this section shall be construed as indicating an intent on the part of Congress to deprive any State, territory, possession, or the Commonwealth of Puerto Rico of jurisdiction over any offense over which it would have jurisdiction in the absence of this section.
- (d)
  - (1) An appeal may be taken directly to the Supreme Court of the United States from any interlocutory or final judgment, decree, or order issued by a United States district court ruling upon the constitutionality of subsection (a).
  - (2) The Supreme Court shall, if it has not previously ruled on the question, accept jurisdiction over the appeal and advance on the docket and expedite to the greatest extent possible.

== See also ==
- Flag desecration
- Flag Desecration Amendment
- Flag Protection Act of 2005
