= Ohio's 30th senatorial district =

American legislative district

Ohio's 30th State Senate district
Senator
| Brian Chavez; R–Marietta |
- Demographics: 90.4% White; 4.5% Black; 1.4% Hispanic; 1% Asian; 2% Native American; 0.1% Hawaiian/Pacific Islander
- Population (2020) • Voting age • Citizens of voting age: 342,270; 276,860; 282,448

Ohio's 30th senatorial district had three more counties added ffter the 2023 redistricting. Guernsey (the Eastern half), Morgan, and Athens counties were added to Carroll Jefferson Harrison, Belmont, Noble, Monroe, Washington and Meigs Counties, making it the largest district in Ohio. It is made up of House Districts 94, 95 and 96.

The current Ohio Senator is Republican Brian Chavez.

== Historically ==
The distract has been based in the Ohio Valley. Before the 2023 Redistricting it now consists of large swaths of eastern and southeastern Ohio and includes the counties of Carroll, Jefferson, Harrison, Belmont, Noble, Monroe, Washington and Meigs as well as portions of Athens and Vinton counties. It encompasses Ohio House of Representatives districts 94, 95 and 96. It has a Cook PVI of R+19.

== List of senators ==
| Senator | Party | Term | Notes |
|---|---|---|---|
| John Longsworth | Republican | January 3, 1967 – December 31, 1968 | Longsworth lost re-election in 1968 to Doug Applegate. |
| Doug Applegate | Democrat | January 3, 1969 – December 31, 1974 | Applegate resigned in 1974 after winning election to the United States Congress. |
| Kinsey Milleson | Democrat | January 3, 1975 – December 31, 1980 | Milleson lost re-election in 1980 to Bill Ress. |
| Bill Ress | Republican | January 3, 1981 – December 31, 1984 | Ress lost re-election in 1984 to Rob Burch. |
| Rob Burch | Democrat | January 3, 1985 – December 31, 1996 | Burch did not seek re-election in 1996 and instead ran for the United States Congress. |
| Gregory L. DiDonato | Democrat | January 6, 1997 – December 31, 2004 | DiDonato was term-limited in 2004. |
| Charlie Wilson | Democrat | January 3, 2005 – December 31, 2006 | Wilson resigned in 2006 after winning election to the United States Congress. |
| Jason Wilson | Democrat | January 2, 2007 – December 5, 2011 | Wilson resigned in 2011 to become Director of the Governor's Office of Appalachia. |
| Lou Gentile | Democrat | December 14, 2011 – December 31, 2016 | Gentile lost re-election in 2016 to Frank Hoagland. |
| Frank Hoagland | Republican | January 3, 2017 – December 1, 2023 | Retired |
| Brian Chavez | Republican | December 6, 2023 – present | Incumbent |
