= Flag desecration =

Deliberately damaging or mistreating a flag

Countries by legality of flag desecration as of 2026

Flag desecration is the desecration of a flag, violation of flag protocol, or various acts that intentionally destroy, damage, or mutilate a flag in public. In the case of a national flag, such action is often intended to make a political point against a country or its policies.

Some countries have laws against methods of destruction, such as burning in public, or forbidding particular uses, such as for commercial purposes. Such laws may distinguish between the desecration of the country's own national flag and the desecration of flags of other countries. Some countries have banned the desecration of all flags on their soil.

== Background ==
Actions that may be treated as the desecration of a flag include burning it, urinating or defecating on it, defacing it with slogans, stepping upon it, damaging it with stones; bullets; or any other projectile, cutting or ripping it, improperly flying it, verbally insulting it, dragging it on the ground, or eating it, among other things.

Flag desecration may be undertaken for a variety of reasons. It may be a protest against a country's foreign policy, including one's own, or the nature of the government in power there. It may be a protest against nationalism or a deliberate and symbolic insult to the people of the country represented by the flag. It may also be a protest at the very laws prohibiting the act of desecrating a flag.

=== Flag desecration laws ===
In some countries, desecrating a flag is illegal and punishable by a prison sentence or a fine. In countries where it is not, the act may still be prosecuted as disorderly conduct or arson or, if conducted on someone else's property, as theft or vandalism.

List of countries' flag desecration permissibility and penalties
Country		Legality	Penalty
Algeria		No	5–10 years imprisonment
Argentina		No	up to 1 year imprisonment
Armenia		No	up to 2 years community service or up to 1 year imprisonment
Australia		Yes	—N/a
Austria		No	up to 6 months imprisonment or a fine
Azerbaijan		No	up to 1 year imprisonment
Belgium		Yes	—N/a
Brazil		No	up to 1 month imprisonment; up to R$10 fine
Bulgaria		No	up to 2 years imprisonment and fine up to €1,600 (for burning the flag of Bulgaria or the EU)
Canada		Yes	—N/a
Chile		No	up to 1 year imprisonment
China		No	up to 3 years imprisonment
Colombia		Yes	Desecrating national symbols is defined as an offense punishable by a fine. However, this provision was declared unconstitutional by the Constitutional Court of Colombia in 2009, and it is therefore no longer considered a criminal offense.
Croatia		No	up to 1 year imprisonment
Czechia		No	fine up to 30,000 CZK
Kingdom of Denmark	Denmark	Yes (only the national flag of Denmark)	desecration of the Danish flag legal; a fine or up to 2 years imprisonment for desecrating a foreign (non-Danish) flag, but law unused since 1936
Kingdom of Denmark	Faroe Islands	No	unknown
Dominican Republic		No	up to 3 months imprisonment; from 5 to 20 minimum wages fine
Egypt		No	fine of up to 30,000 Egyptian pounds
Estonia		No	up to 1 years imprisonment; fine
Ethiopia		No	up to 3 years imprisonment; up to Br 5,000 fine
Finland		No	fine of unspecified amount in legal code
France		No	up to 6 months imprisonment; up to €7,500 fine
Germany		No	up to 3 years imprisonment
Greece		No	up to 3 years imprisonment
Hong Kong		No	up to 3 years imprisonment; up to HK$50,000 fine
Hungary		No	up to 1 year imprisonment
India		No	up to 4 months imprisonment up to ₹10,000 fine
Indonesia		No	up to 10 years imprisonment; up to Rp 1,000,000,000 fine
Iran		No (only the national flag of Islamic Republic of Iran)	up to 2 years imprisonment for national flag. desecrating some foreign countries flags (such as United States and Israel) is legal and actively performed.
Ireland		Yes	—N/a
Israel		No	up to 3 years imprisonment
Italy		No	up to 2 years imprisonment; €1,000–€10,000 fine
Japan		No	up to 2 years imprisonment or a fine of up to ¥200,000
Kazakhstan		No	up to 2 years imprisonment or house arrest, or 900 hours community service; up to 3,000 MCI fine
Kyrgyzstan		No	3–6 months imprisonment or up to 1 year house arrest; 50–100 monthly minimum wages fine
Lithuania		No	up to 2 years imprisonment; variable fine
Malaysia		No	depending on the criminal charges
Mexico		No	6 months to 2 years imprisonment
Morocco		No	6 months to 3 years imprisonment (extended to 1 to 5 years if committed publicly), and/or a fine of 10,000DH to 100,000DH
Kingdom of the Netherlands	Netherlands	Yes	—N/a
Kingdom of the Netherlands	Aruba	No	up to 2 months imprisonment; Afl. 5,000 fine
Kingdom of the Netherlands	Curaçao	No	up to 2 months imprisonment; 5,000Cg fine. Both doubled for a repeat offence within one year
Kingdom of the Netherlands	Sint Maarten	Yes	—N/a
New Zealand		No	NZ$5,000 fine
Nigeria		No	A fine of ₦100 and in the case of a continuing offence to a fine of ₦10 for every day or part of a day during which the offence is continued after the day on which such person is first convicted.
North Macedonia		No	unknown
Norway		Yes	legal since 2008
Pakistan		No	varies
Philippines		No	up to 1 year imprisonment; up to ₱20,000 fine
Poland		No	up to 1 year imprisonment; variable fine
Portugal		No	up to 1 year imprisonment and up to €60,000 fine for foreign flags; up to 2 years imprisonment and up to €120,000 fine for the national flag.
Romania		Yes	—N/a
Russia		No	up to 4 years imprisonment
Samoa		No	up to 6 months imprisonment
Saudi Arabia		No	up to 1 year imprisonment; up to ر.س 3,000 fine
Singapore		No	up to 6 months imprisonment; up to S$30,000 fine
Slovenia		No	fine or up to 1 year imprisonment
South Africa		Yes	legal since 1994
South Korea		No	up to 10 years imprisonment; up to ₩7 million fine
Spain		No	€420–€144,000 fine
Suriname		No	up to 6 months imprisonment
Sweden		Yes	legal since 1971
Switzerland		Yes (Private only)	
Taiwan		No	up to 1 year imprisonment; up to NT$9,000 fine
Thailand		No	up to 6 years imprisonment; ฿2,000 fine
Turkey		No	up to 3 years imprisonment
Ukraine		No	up to 1 year imprisonment
United Arab Emirates		No	10 years to 25 years imprisonment; fine of at least DH 500,000
United Kingdom		Yes	—N/a
United States		Yes	—N/a
Uzbekistan		No	up to 360 hours community service or 3 years penal labour; up to 25 BCU fine

== By jurisdiction ==
=== Algeria ===
In Algeria, flag desecration is a crime. According to article 160 bis of the Algerian penal code, the intentional and public shredding, distortion, or desecration of the national flag is punishable by five to ten years of imprisonment.

In 2010, an Algerian court convicted 18 people of flag desecration and punished them by up to six years of imprisonment and $10,000 in fines after protests about jobs and housing.

=== Argentina ===
The Penal Code (Código Penal) on its Article 222 criminalizes the public desecration of the national flag, coat of arms, national anthem, or any provincial symbol, imposing one to four years of imprisonment. In other words, in Argentina, flag desecration is a crime punishable by up to one year of imprisonment.

=== Armenia ===
The Armenian criminal code punishes any insult to the flag (as well as to the coat of arms and the national anthem) with community service of up to two years or imprisonment of up to one year.

=== Australia ===
==== Legality ====
Flag desecration is not, in itself, illegal in Australia. However, flag desecration must be compliant with the law.

In Coleman v Kinbacher & Anor (Qld Police), Coleman was successfully prosecuted for flag burning, not because of its political nature, but because given the size of the flag, the use of petrol as an accelerant, and the fact that it was in an open park area, many members of the public experienced "concern, fright and anger", and in these circumstances flag burning could be considered disorderly conduct.

==== Attempts to ban flag burning ====
There have been several attempts to pass bills making flag burning illegal in Australia, none of which have yet been successful. For four consecutive years between 1989 and 1992, National Party MP Michael Cobb introduced bills making it an offence to desecrate, dishonour, burn, mutilate or destroy the Australian national flag. On each occasion, the bill failed. As of May 2016, the most recent bill which attempted to ban flag burning was the Flags Amendment (Protecting Australian Flags) Bill 2016, which was introduced by National Party MP George Christensen but lapsed in April 2016.

==== Historical occurrences ====
During the 2005 Cronulla riots, a Lebanese-Australian youth, whose name has been kept secret, climbed a Returned and Services League (RSL) club building and tore down its flag before setting it on fire. The youth was sentenced to 12 months probation not for flag desecration but for the destruction of property of the RSL. In October of that year the youth accepted an invitation from the RSL to carry the Australian flag along with war veterans in the Anzac Day march the following year. However, the RSL was forced to withdraw this invitation as it received phone calls from people threatening to pelt the youth with missiles on the day. The head of the New South Wales RSL was quoted as saying that "the people who made these threats ought to be bloody ashamed of themselves".

In 2006, Australian contemporary artist Azlan McLennan burnt an Australian flag and displayed it on a billboard outside the Trocadero artspace in Footscray, Victoria. He called the artpiece Proudly UnAustralian.

The socialist youth group Resistance marketed "flag-burning kits" – inspired by, and to protest, the censorship of Azlan McLennan's art – to university students.

Tasmanian Aboriginal Centre worker Adam Thompson burned the Australian flag on the week of Australia Day (2008) celebrations in Launceston's City Park to the cheers of about 100 people, who were rallying against what they call "Invasion Day".

Tent embassy activists burned the Australian flag on 27 January 2012 at the entrance to Canberra's Parliament House as they called for Aboriginal sovereignty over Australia.

=== Austria ===
In Austria, sections 248 and 317 of the federal law criminal code state that desecration of national and international symbols in a manner that makes the act known to a broad public is illegal. Section 248 deals specifically with maliciously insulting, disparaging or degrading a flag, emblem or anthem of the republic or one of its federal states; section 317 does the same for those of foreign states or international organizations. Punishment in both cases is imprisonment for up to six months, or a fine.

=== Azerbaijan ===
The Criminal Code of Azerbaijan, Article 324, penalizes desecration of the national flag or state emblem with imprisonment for up to one year.

=== Belgium ===
Flag desecration is not illegal in Belgium. Flemish nationalists have burned Belgian flags on at least one occasion.

=== Brazil ===
Brazilian law number 5700, chapter V, from 1971, concerns respect and the national flag:

Article 30 states that, when in the flag is being marched or paraded (for example, when the national anthem is being played), everyone present must take a respectful attitude, standing in silence. Males must remove any head coverings. Military personnel must salute or present arms according to their corps' internal regulations.

Article 31 states that people are prohibited from:

1. presenting or flying any national flag which is in a poor condition;
2. altering the proportions, colors, shape, or label of the national flag, or defacing it with numbers, words or symbols or any other inscriptions;
3. using the national flag as clothing, a mouth covering, curtain, tablecloth or napkin, table trim, a podium coating, or as a cover for objects that are to be inaugurated; and
4. using the national flag as a label or wrapping for products at a sale.

Article 32 states that flags in a bad condition must be sent to the nearest military unit for incineration on Flag Day according to ceremonial procedures.

Article 33 states that, except at diplomatic missions such as embassies and consulates, no foreign flag may be flown without a Brazilian flag of the same size in a prominent position alongside it.

Chapter VI of the law states, in article 35, that the act of a civilian breaking this law is considered a misdemeanor, punished with a fine of one to four times the highest reference value active in the country, doubled in repeated infringement cases. In the Brazilian Armed Forces' Military Penal Code, article 161, a soldier, airman or seaman who disrespects any national symbol is punished with one to two years' detention; officers may be declared unsuitable for their rank. In other words, the desecration of a flag is illegal in Brazil and punishable by one month of imprisonment and a fine of up to ten reais.

=== Bulgaria ===
The desecration of any national symbol, including the national flag, is a crime in Bulgaria, which is punishable by up to two years of imprisonment and a fine of up to €1,600.

=== Canada ===
==== Legality ====
Flag desecration is not, in itself, a crime in Canada. Acts of this nature are forms of expression protected by the Canadian Charter of Rights and Freedoms.

In 1990, during heated political times around the Meech Lake Accord, the flag of Quebec was desecrated by protestors in Brockville, Ontario opposed to Quebec's language laws after the Canadian flag had been burnt in protests in Quebec. Televised images of individuals stepping on the Quebec flag were played in Quebec and contributed to the deterioration in relations between Quebec and English Canada. The incident, seen as a metaphor of Canada's perceived rejection of Quebec (and of Quebec's distinctiveness in the demise of the Meech Lake Accord) was invoked by Quebec nationalists during the run-up to the 1995 referendum on Quebec independence and is still remembered today.

In 1999, members of the Westboro Baptist Church from the United States staged a burning of the Canadian Flag outside of the Supreme Court of Canada in Ottawa, Ontario. This was to protest legalization of same-sex marriage which was being adjudicated by the Canadian court.

=== Chile ===
The Ley de Seguridad Interior del Estado, articles 6 and 7, defines as a crime the public desecration of the national flag, coat of arms, the name of the country or the national anthem, and imposes a period of imprisonment, relegation or estrangement for a period of up to one year.

=== China ===
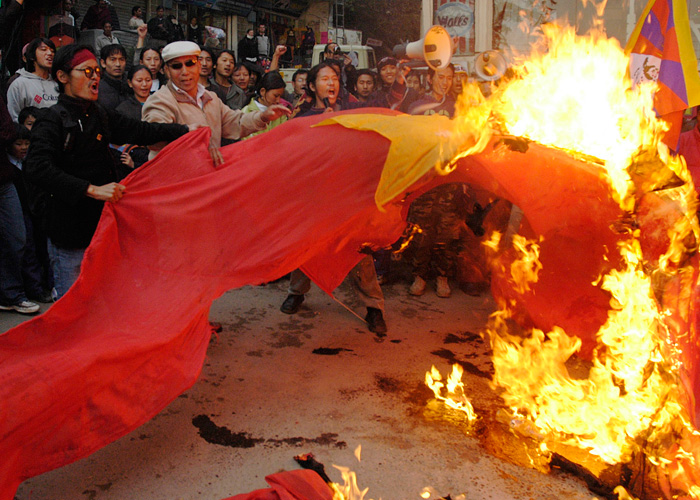
Chinese flag burned by Tibetan protesters in India, 2008

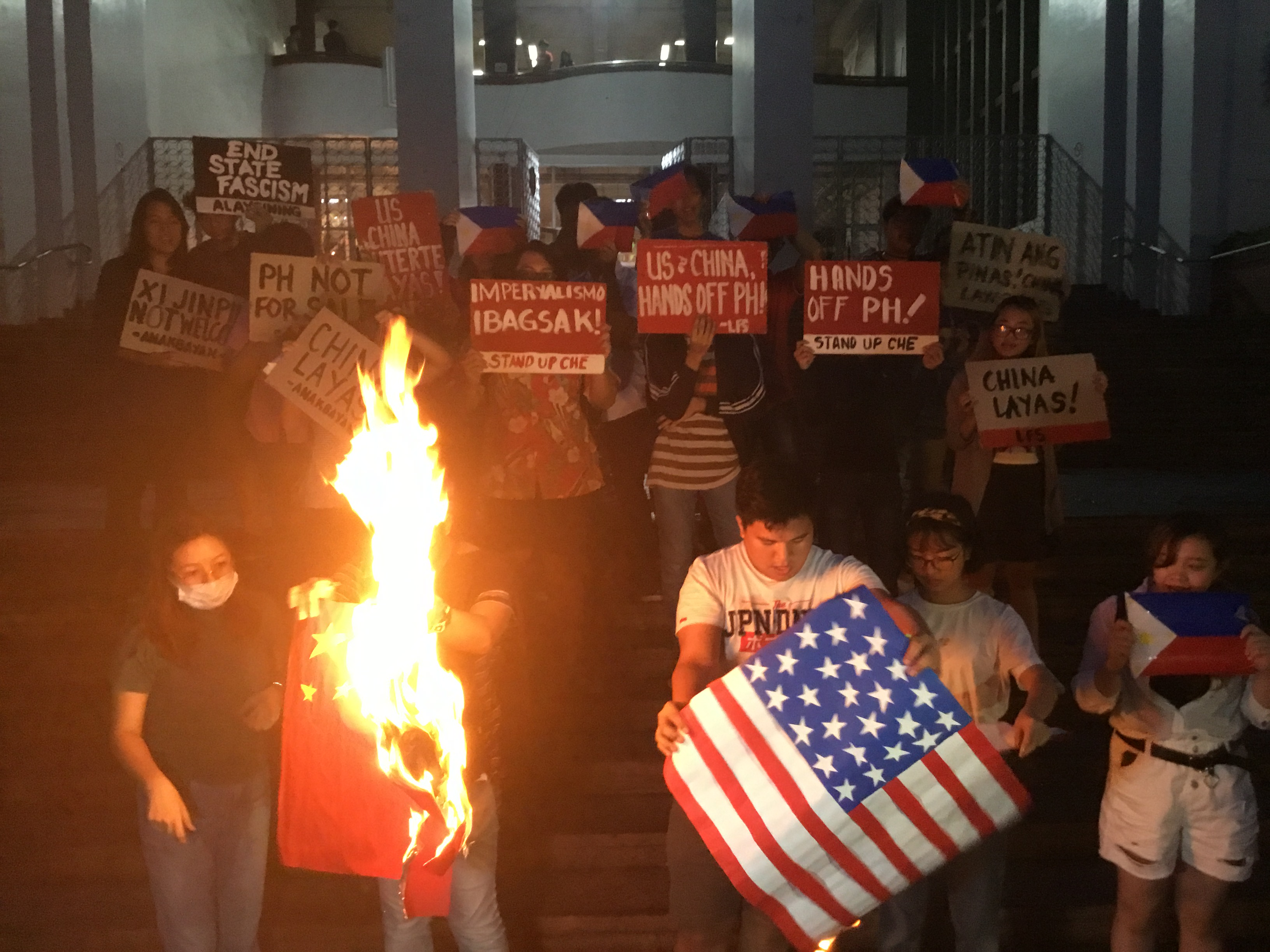
Student activists from the University of the Philippines and Ateneo de Manila University burn the flags of China and the US to protest against their encroachment of Philippine sovereignty.

Flag desecration is a crime in China. Article 299 of the penal code provides for up to three years of imprisonment criminal detention, public surveillance, or deprivation of political rights for "whoever desecrates the National Flag or the National Emblem of the People's Republic of China by intentionally burning, mutilating, scrawling on, defiling or trampling upon it in a public place".

==== Hong Kong ====
Chinese laws concerning flag desecration were incorporated into Hong Kong law as the National Flag and National Emblem Ordinance in 1997 as required by Annex III of the territory's constitution. The Regional Flag and Regional Emblem Ordinance is the equivalent statute in respect of the Hong Kong flag. Both ordinances ban desecration of the Chinese flag and Hong Kong flag, respectively, through methods including "burning, mutilating, scrawling on, defiling or trampling".

In 1999, two individuals were convicted for desecration of the Regional Flag of Hong Kong and the Chinese flag. They were found guilty by a magistrate, had the conviction overturned in the High Court but the convictions were restored by the Court of Final Appeal. They were bound over to keep the peace on their own recognisance of $2,000 for 12 months for each of the two charges. In the judgment, Chief Justice Andrew Li said although the Basic Law of Hong Kong guarantees freedom of speech, flag desecration is not legal because there are other protest methods.

Social activist Koo Sze-yiu has been convicted several times of flag desecration. He was sentenced to a nine-month prison term in 2013 for the offence. However, the sentence was reduced to four months and two weeks after an appeal. In March 2016, he was sentenced to a six-week prison term for burning the regional flag in Wanchai on HKSAR Establishment Day in 2015. Koo responded that "he is happy to be punished as being jailed is part of the life of an activist, and he would continue to protest against the Beijing and Hong Kong governments and fight for democracy." In January 2021, Koo was again jailed, this time for four months, for displaying an inverted Chinese flag with slogans written on it in July 2020.

In October 2016, some miniature Chinese and Hong Kong flags that had been placed by pro-Beijing legislators in the Legislative Council chamber were flipped upside down by lawmaker Cheng Chung-tai, who regarded them as "cheap patriotic acts". In April 2017 he was charged with flag desecration. He alleged that the arrest was part of a "general cleansing" of dissenting voices ahead of Carrie Lam's inauguration as new chief executive. On 29 September 2017, the Eastern Magistrates' Court found Cheng guilty and fined him $5,000.

In December 2019, a 13-year-old girl was sentenced to 12 months' probation for flag desecration during the 2019–20 Hong Kong protests. She received a curfew as well as a criminal record; the act was described as "rash" by magistrate Kelly Shui. Government intervention was on the basis of "(maliciously) challenging the national sovereignty".

=== Colombia ===
The Constitutional Court of Colombia, in its judgment C-575 of 2009, declared the offense of desecration of national emblems or symbols —stipulated in Article 461 of Law 599 of 2000 (the Penal Code) and punishable by a fine— to be unconstitutional. The Court found the penalty disproportionate and the term "ultraje" (desecration) ambiguous, concluding that these elements infringed upon freedom of expression and the principle of legality.

=== Croatia ===
Croatian history recalls the burning of the flag of the Kingdom of Hungary during the 1895 visit of Emperor Franz Joseph to Zagreb. Two people involved in the incident, Stjepan Radić and Vladimir Vidrić, later pursued notable careers in politics and literature, respectively. In modern Croatia, desecrating any national flag or treating any national flag in a disrespectful manner is a felony. Offenders can face up to one year of imprisonment.

=== Kingdom of Denmark ===
==== Denmark ====
In Denmark, it is legal to burn or desecrate the national flag, the Dannebrog. However, it is illegal to publicly burn or desecrate the flags of foreign countries, the United Nations or the Council of Europe according to § 110e of the Danish penal code because Parliament has decided that burning or desecrating these is a matter of foreign relations, as it could be construed as a threat. This law is rarely enforced; the last conviction was in 1936.

Although there are no laws regulating the disposal of a worn out Dannebrog, the tradition is to burn it privately.

==== Faroe Islands ====
In the autonomous Faroe Islands, the flag law states that the Faroese flag, Merkið, may not be desecrated, "neither by words nor by deeds".

=== Dominican Republic ===
The law of patriotic symbols (Law 210-19) which among other things regulates the use of the national flag, states that any person who desecrates the flag may be punished with 1 to 3 months of imprisonment and a fine ranging from 5 to 20 minimum wages.

=== Egypt ===
Flag desecration has been illegal in Egypt since 2014. It is punishable by a fine of up to 30,000 Egyptian pounds (about $4,300).

=== Estonia ===
According to section 245 of the Estonian criminal code, it desecrating the national flag or other national symbols is punishable by imprisonment up to one year or a fine. According to section 249, defaming or desecrating foreign flags or symbols of other countries is also punishable by imprisonment up to one year, or a fine.

=== Ethiopia ===
In 2009, the Parliament of Ethiopia passed Proclamation 654/2009 (The Federal Flag Proclamation), which prohibited firstly amongst 23 other provisions "use [of] the Flag without its Emblem", as well as "to deface the Flag by writing or displaying signs, [sic] symbols, emblems or picture [sic]", or "to prepare or use the Flag without the proper order of its colors and size or its Emblem". While most offenses were punishable by a fine of "3000 birr or rigorous imprisonment up to one year", the first offense, mandating the usage of the emblem, received an increased penalty of "5000 birr or the rigorous imprisonment of up to three years". This replaced the 1996 Flag Proclamation, which had made no mention of offenses or penalties.

=== Finland ===
According to section 8 of the law on the Finnish flag, it is illegal to desecrate the flag, treat it in disrespecting manner, or remove it from a public place without permission.

=== France ===
According to French law, a person outraging the French national anthem or the French flag during an event organized or regulated by public authorities is liable to a fine of up to €7,500 and a punishment of up to six months of imprisonment if performing in a gathering. The law targets "outrageous behaviour" during public ceremonies and major sports events.

This clause was added as an amendment to a large bill dealing with internal security, in reaction to a football match during which there had been whistles against La Marseillaise, but also to similar actions during public ceremonies. The amendment initially prohibited such behaviour regardless of the context, but a parliamentary commission later restricted its scope to events organized or regulated by public authorities, which is to be understood, according to the ruling of the Constitutional Council, as events organized by public authorities, mass sport matches and other mass events taking place in enclosures, but not private speech, literary or artistic works, or speech during events not organized or regulated by public authorities.

In 2006, a man who had publicly burnt a French flag stolen from the façade of the city hall of Aurillac during a public festival, organized and regulated by public authorities, was fined €300.

A July 2010 law makes it a crime to desecrate the French national flag in a public place, but also to distribute images of a flag desecration, even when done in a private setting, if the objective is to create trouble in public space. On 22 December 2010, an Algerian national was the first person to be convicted under the new status, and ordered to pay a €750 fine after breaking the pole of a flag hung in the Alpes-Maritimes prefecture a day prior.

=== Germany ===
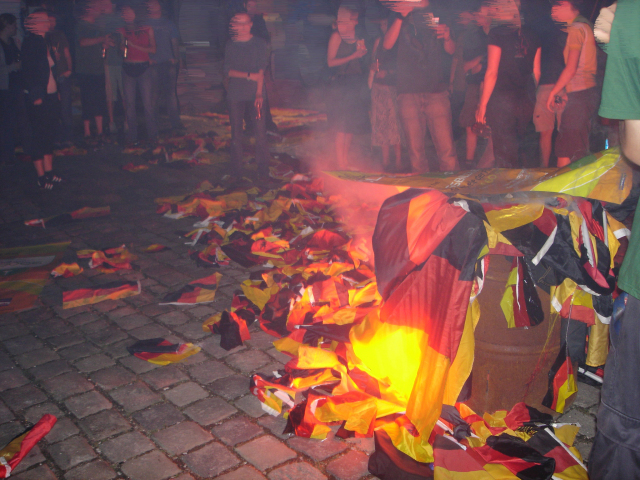
German flags being burned in protest

Under the German criminal code (§90a Strafgesetzbuch (StGB)), it is illegal to revile or damage the German federal flag as well as any flags of its states in public. Offenders can be fined or sentenced to a maximum of three years in prison, or fined or sentenced to a maximum of five years in prison if the act was intentionally used to support the eradication of the Federal Republic of Germany or to violate constitutional rights. Actual convictions because of a violation of the criminal code need to be balanced against the constitutional right of the freedom of expression, as ruled multiple times by Germany's constitutional court.

The original law from 1932 was expanded in 1935 to include the flag of Nazi Germany.

As of 2020, it is also punishable by up to three years of imprisonment for damaging or reviling the flag of any foreign country (§104 StGB). Until then, only flags that were shown publicly by tradition, event, or routinely by representatives of an official foreign entity were protected. The legislative reform to include also unofficially or privately used flags was an explicit reaction to the repeated burning of Israeli flags during anti-Israeli protests.

As part of that reform, a newly formed §90c StGB was introduced that extends the scope of protection to the flag and anthem of the European Union.

After the fall of the Berlin Wall in November 1989, some East Germans cut out the emblem from their national flag in support for a reunified, democratic Germany. This flag is now used by the Federal Foundation for the Reappraisal of the SED Dictatorship.

=== Greece ===
Under article 188 of Greece's Penal code, flag desecration, along with the desecration of other Greek symbols, is illegal and punishable by up to two years of imprisonment.

=== Hungary ===
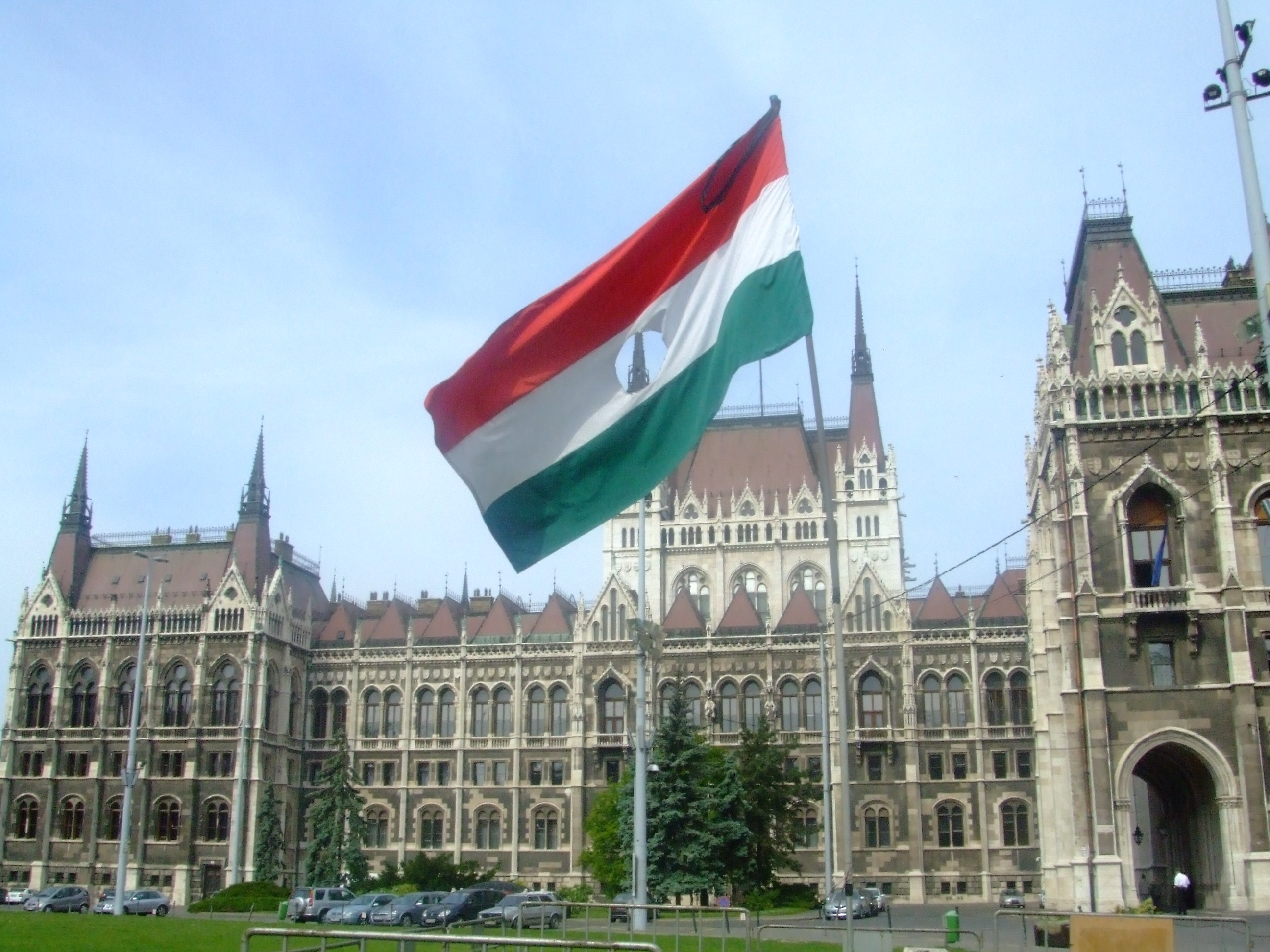
1956 Revolution Flag flying in front of the Hungarian Parliament Building

Desecration of the national flag is illegal in Hungary.

During a demonstration at the beginning of the Hungarian revolution of 1956 someone in the crowd cut out the communist coat of arms from the Hungarian flag, leaving a distinctive hole, and others quickly followed suit. The "flag with a hole" became a symbol of the Hungarian resistance. The practice of cutting out the communist coat of arms was also followed by other Eastern Bloc countries, such as Romania, especially during the Revolutions of 1989.

=== India ===
The Indian Flag Code is a set of laws that govern the usage of the Flag of India. The Bureau of Indian Standards is in charge of the enforcement of the manufacture of the flag according to the guidelines.

Violation of the code may invite severe punishments and penalties. The code was written in 2002 and merged the following acts: provisions of the Emblems and Names (Prevention of Improper Use) Act, 1950 (No. 12 of 1950) and the Prevention of Insults to National Honour Act, 1971 (No. 69 of 1971).

The Indian Flag Code was often criticized for being too rigid and prevented ordinary citizens from displaying the flag on homes and other buildings. For many years, only government officials and other government buildings could unfurl the flag. That changed in 2001 when Naveen Jindal won a court case in the Supreme Court of India to give Indians the right to unfurl the flag publicly. The Indian cricket batsman Sachin Tendulkar was accused of sporting the flag on his cricket helmet below the BCCI emblem. He later changed it and placed the flag above the emblem. The flag code was updated in 2005; some new provisions include that the flag cannot be worn under the waist or on undergarments.

=== Indonesia ===
Article 24 of Law No. 24/2009 on Flags, Language, National Symbols, and Anthems, states that people are prohibited from:

1. destroying, tearing, trampling, burning, or performing other actions with the intention to tarnish, insult, or degrade the honour of the national flag;
2. using the national flag for billboards or commercials;
3. flying the national flag if it is damaged, torn, smudged, crumpled, or faded;
4. printing on, embroidering or adding letters, numbers, images or other signs, or adding badges or any objects to the national flag;
5. using the national flag to cover a ceiling or roof, or for wrapping or covering goods in a way that can degrade the honor of the national flag.

Article 66 and 67 of Law No. 24/2009 states that anyone who commits any of these prohibited acts may face up to ten years of imprisonment as punishment or a fine of up to a billion rupiah.

=== Iran ===
In Iran, desecration of the national flag is a crime.

=== Iraq ===
In 2004, many copies of the proposed new flag for Iraq were burnt (see flag of Iraq). There were no such examples of burning the current Iraqi national flags, even by political opponents, as both contain the takbir, so this would be seen as a religious insult in Islam.

=== Ireland ===
The Department of the Taoiseach's guide to the flag of Ireland includes a list of "practices to avoid". This states in part "The National Flag should never be defaced by placing slogans, logos, lettering or pictures of any kind on it, for example at sporting events." A tricolour inscribed "Davy Keogh says hello" waved continually since 1981 has given its eponymous bearer a modicum of fame among Republic of Ireland soccer supporters. Guinness ran a promotion before the 2002 FIFA World Cup distributing Irish flags to supporters in pubs, on which the tricolour's white band was defaced with Guinness's harp logo (which is similar to, but different from, the harp on the Irish coat of arms). Guinness apologised after public criticism. Cecilia Keaveney said in a subsequent Dáil debate, "It may not be possible to address defacing the flag through legislation, but the House must issue a strong message that this is unacceptable."

Seán O'Casey's 1926 play The Plough and the Stars attracted controversy for its critical view of the Easter Rising, in particular a scene in which a tricolour is brought into a pub frequented by a prostitute. On 7 May 1945, the day before V-E Day, celebrating unionist students in Trinity College Dublin raised the flags of the victorious Allies over the college; when onlookers in College Green began jeering, some took down the flag of neutral Ireland, set fire to it and tossed it away, provoking a small riot. In response, nationalist students from University College Dublin, including future Taoiseach Charles Haughey, burned the British flag in Grafton Street. The Provost of Trinity College apologised for the incident, which was not reported in Irish newspapers owing to wartime censorship.

=== Israel ===
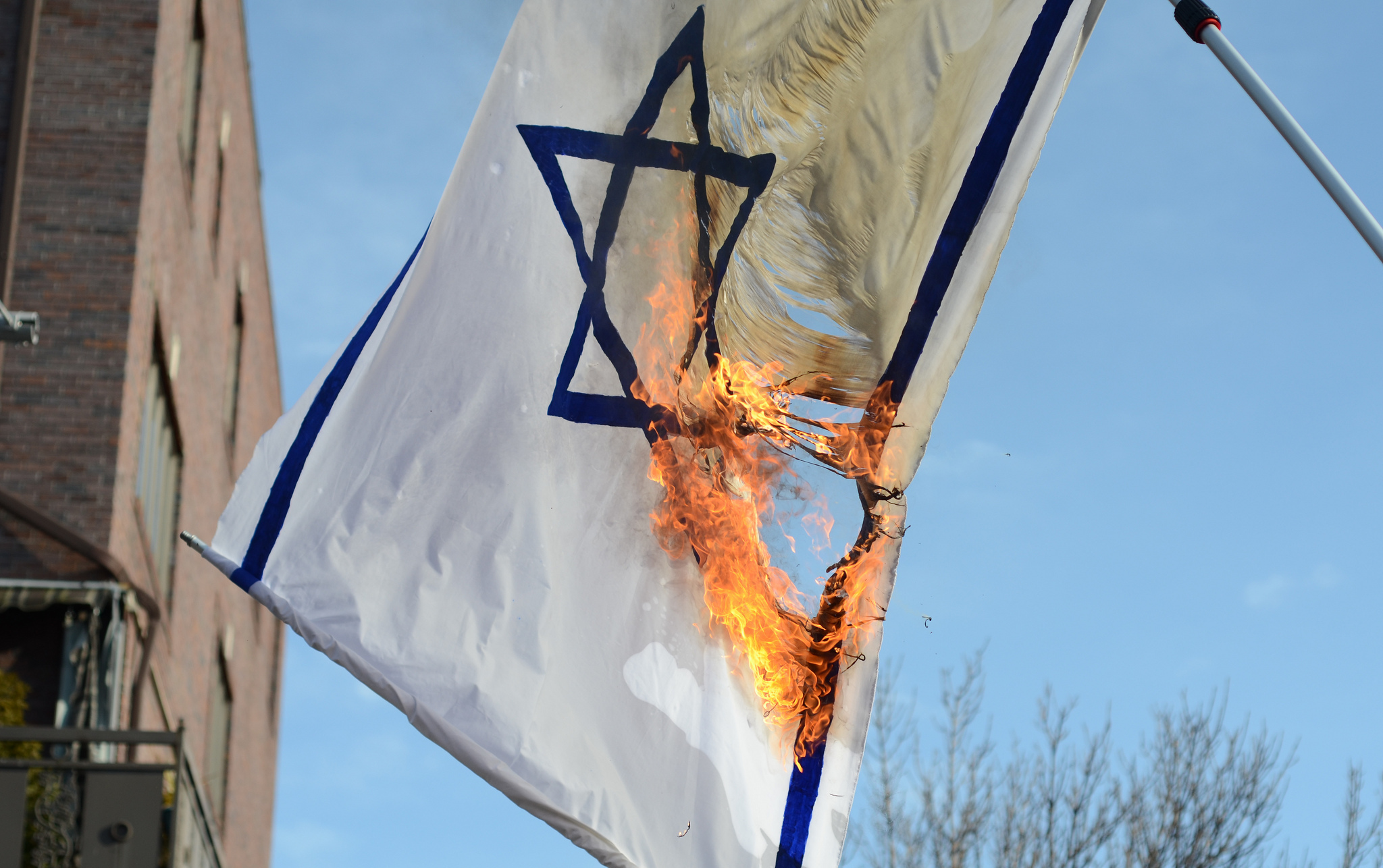
A non-standard flag of Israel being burned by the strictly Orthodox Neturei Karta sect

In 2007, six teenagers in the South Tel Aviv suburb of Bat Yam were arrested directly for burning an Israeli flag. This incident was considered serious by the police and others since the youths were suspected in other acts of vandalism and claimed to be Satanists.

In 2022, Israel passed a new amendment, meaning those convicted of deliberately burning an Israeli flag face up to three years in prison.

=== Italy ===
In Italy, the desecration of any Italian or foreign nation's national flag (vilipendio alla bandiera) is prohibited by law (Article 292 of the Italian Penal Code) and punished with fines (between €1000 and €10,000) for verbal desecration and with imprisonment (up to two years) for physical damage or destruction.

=== Jamaica ===
Flag desecration is considered legal in Jamaica, especially because it is part of flag protocol to dispose of it when it is torn.

A German advert depicted the flag being torched in a coffee shop.

=== Japan ===
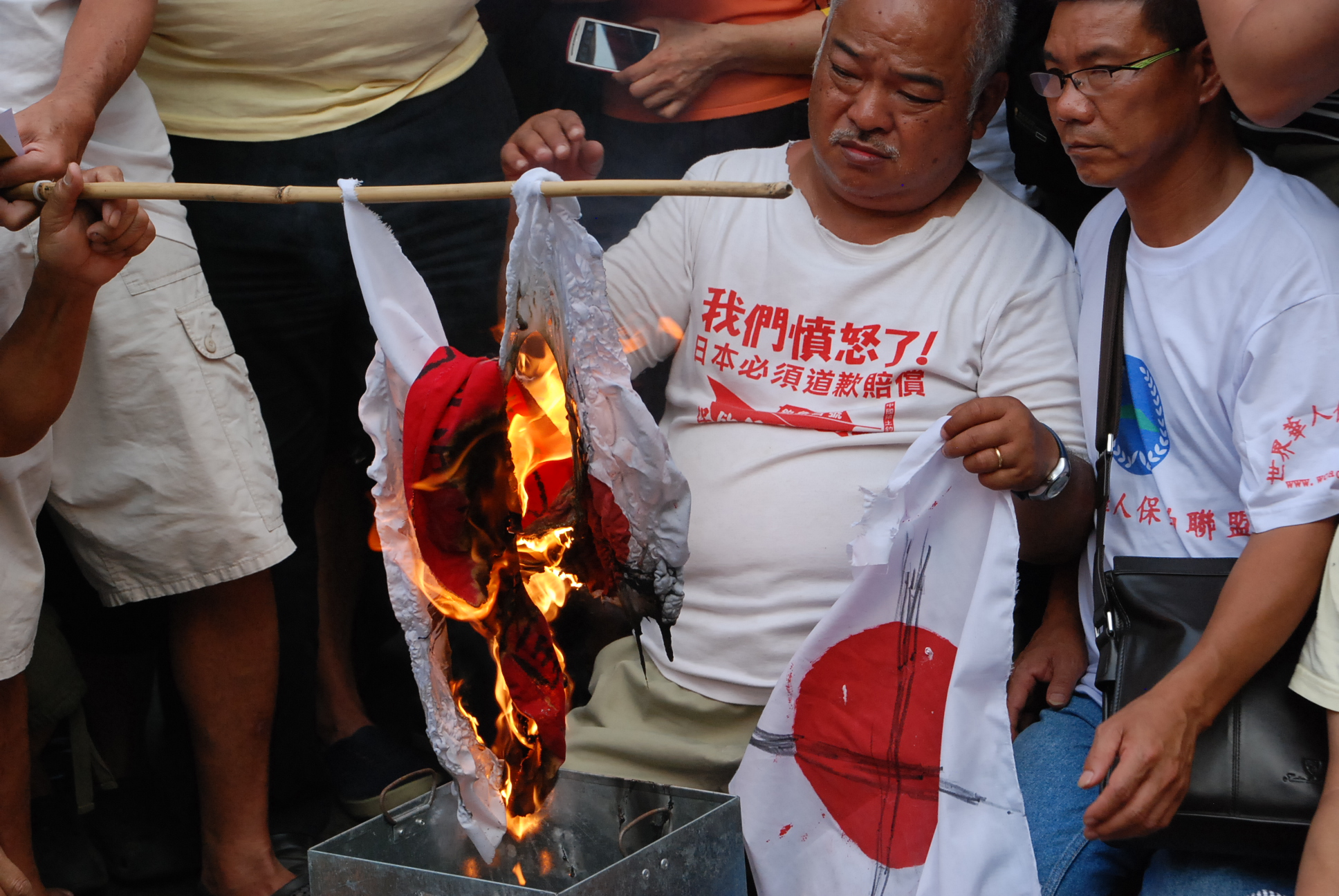
Japanese flag being burned by protestors in front of the Consulate-General of Japan in Hong Kong

In Japan, under Chapter 4, Article 92 of the Criminal Code, the desecration of a recognized foreign nation's national flag and symbol to dishonour that particular nation is illegal and results in fine or penal labour, but only on complaint by the foreign government. Additionally, the Criminal Code forbids publicly damaging, removing, or defiling a "tangible object recognized in common social understanding" as being used as the Japanese national flag, in a manner that "causes people to feel extreme discomfort or disgust".

In May 1958, the flag of the People's Republic of China, the Wǔ Xīng Hóngqí, at a postage stamp convention was pulled down and damaged, but as Japan did not recognize the PRC at the time, the law was not applied. In February 2011, Japanese ultra-rightists held a protest over the Kuril Islands dispute outside of the Russian embassy in Tokyo, during which they dragged a Russian flag on the ground; Russian foreign minister Sergey Lavrov stated that his ministry had asked the Japanese government to launch a criminal case over the incident. On 26 October 1987, an Okinawan supermarket owner burned the Hinomaru, before the start of the National Sports Festival of Japan. The flag burner, Shōichi Chibana, burned the national flag not only to show opposition to atrocities committed by the wartime Japanese army and the continued Japanese-requested presence of U.S. forces, but also to prevent it from being displayed in public. Other incidents in Okinawa included the flag being torn down during school ceremonies and students refusing to honor the flag as it was being raised to the sounds of "Kimigayo".

The desecration of the Japanese flag, the Hinomaru, was not a crime until 2026. Absent from such law, the act of desecration was implicitly protected by Article 21 covering freedom of speech in the Constitution of Japan. In late January 2021, a group inside the ruling Liberal Democratic Party including Sanae Takaichi announced an intention to propose a law in the Diet to prohibit the desecration of the Hinomaru. However, this attempt did not proceed past the internal screenings of the party. On 20 October 2025, LDP and Japan Innovation Party formed a coalition government, with Takaichi as the Prime Minister. The coalition agreement includes a promise to criminalize the desecration of the national flag during the 2026 Ordinary Diet Session. On 30 June 2026, the House of Representatives passed the Law Concerning the Punishment of Damage to the National Flag, which criminalizes the desecration of the flag of Japan. On 17 July 2026, the House of Councillors passed the act, enacting it into law.

=== Kazakhstan ===
In Kazakhstan, under Chapter 14, Article 317 of the Criminal Code, an individual involved in flag desecration (including any state symbol) could face up to a fine of 3,000 monthly calculation index (10,350,000 tenge as of 2023). Additionally, they could be sentenced to up to two years of house arrest or imprisonment and may also be required to perform up to 900 hours of community service.

=== Lithuania ===
The desecration of the national flag, coat of arms or anthem of Lithuania is punishable by an arrest or up to 2 years of imprisonment, or other fines.

=== Malaysia ===
While Malaysia does not have specific legislation regarding flag desecration, legal action can be taken against those who show disrespect towards the national flag Jalur Gemilang under the Penal Code, Sedition Act 1948 and the Emblems and Names (Prevention of Improper Use) Act 1963.

In May 2013, a group of Malaysian Chinese students in Taiwan, were photographed with an upside-down national flag, and claimed the action was "to express their dissatisfaction of the just-concluded general election that they alleged was carried out in an undemocratic way".

In September 2013, the government tabled an amendment bill on the Penal Code in an attempt to criminalise the desecration of a foreign flag, and the use of a non-recognised flag to represent Malaysia, which would be punishable with five to fifteen years of imprisonment. This legislative move came after several left-wing activists were arrested for flying the Sang Saka Malaya flag back on 30 August that year, and was cited by Law Minister Nancy Shukri as part of the reasons for tabling this proposed amendment. However, following criticisms from several MPs, the bill was retracted in October 2013. Nevertheless, Nancy Shukri clarified that provisions for safeguarding the national flag would be added under a proposed National Harmony Act.

In 2016, nine Australian men, the 'Budgie Nine', were arrested after celebrating the 2016 Malaysian Grand Prix by stripping to their 'budgie smuggler' swimming trunks, decorated with the Malaysian flag. They were charged for public nuisance after spending three days in custody. Their charges were later dismissed and they were released with only a warning. The briefs were reportedly made in Australia instead of Malaysia.

In 2019, a businessman named Lee Kim Yew was reported to have dishonored the national flag by changing its white stripes to black in an online post. The image, which has since been removed, was uploaded along with a post by Lee highlighting his recent blog entry on the inclusion of Jawi script lessons in Malay-language textbooks for Year 4 students. His action drew widespread online criticism and Lee's Facebook account appeared to have been deactivated later on.

=== Mexico ===
The use of the national symbols (coat of arms, anthem, and national flag) in Mexico is protected by law. In Mexico, the desecration of the national flag and coat of arms is a crime punishable by six months to two years in prison, or a fine of 50 to 3,000 pesos (between US$2 and US$152), or both sanctions. Although punishment is not sought often and are usually not harsh, there are a few instances; for example, in 2008 a federal judge convicted an individual for 'desecrating the flag' in a poem. The ministry that oversees the use of national symbols requested four years in jail, but the judge only issued a small fine and a public warning.

=== Morocco ===
In Morocco, desecrating the national flag is a criminal offense under Law No. 17-05, which amended the Penal Code in 2005. The law criminalizes any form of outrage against the emblems and symbols of the kingdom, explicitly including the national flag. Under Article 267-1, individuals who insult or desecrate the flag—through acts such as burning, defacing, or using it disrespectfully—may face 6 months to 3 years in prison, and/or a fine of 10,000 to 100,000 dirhams. If committed publicly (e.g., during protests or on social media), the penalty increases to between 1 and 5 years in prison, with the same fine range. The law also penalizes incitement or promotion of such acts under Article 267-2, which provides for 3 months to 1 year of imprisonment and a fine ranging from 20,000 to 200,000 dirhams for anyone who praises, incites, or encourages offenses against the national symbols, including the flag.

=== Nepal ===
Burning the national flag is illegal in Nepal. The Criminal Code has a provision of a three-year jail sentence or a Rs 30,000 (about US$300) fine or both if one is found disrespecting or damaging the national anthem or the national flag.

=== Kingdom of the Netherlands ===
==== Netherlands ====
In the Netherlands, there are no laws in place banning flag desecration.

The Public Prosecution Service clarified that under the right to freedom of expression, many (potentially offensive) statements are permitted, provided they are part of the public debate, and "action will only be taken against groups of people if they commit criminal offences or pose a threat to public order".

===== Bonaire, Sint Eustatius, and Saba =====
Bonaire, Sint Eustatius, and Saba are special municipalities of the Netherlands and therefore follow Dutch law.

==== Aruba ====
According to article 8 of the 'National ordinance on the flag, coat of arms, anthem, and national symbol of Aruba', he who speaks disparagingly in public about the flag, or who defiles, burns, or otherwise fails to show due respect to the flag shall be punished by imprisonment for a maximum of two months or a fine of Afl. 5,000.

==== Curaçao ====
"Anyone who intentionally damages, defiles, or diminishes the prestige of the flag through insulting acts shall receive a punishment of a maximum of two months in prison or a fine of up to 5,000Cg. Anyone who commits violations of these rules a second time within one year receives a punishment twice as heavy as those already mentioned".

==== Sint Maarten ====
There are no laws regarding flag desecration in the 'National ordinance regulating the flag of the country of Sint Maarten'.

=== New Zealand ===
In New Zealand, under the Flags, Emblems and Names Protection Act 1981 it is illegal to destroy the New Zealand flag with the intent of dishonouring it. In 2003, Paul Hopkinson, a Wellington schoolteacher, burned the national flag of New Zealand as part of a protest in Parliament grounds at the New Zealand Government's hosting of the Prime Minister of Australia, against the background of Australia's support of the United States in the Iraq War. Hopkinson was initially convicted under Flags, Emblems and Names Protection Act 1981 of destroying a New Zealand flag with intent to dishonour it, but appealed his conviction. On appeal, his conviction was overturned on the grounds that the law had to be read consistently with the right to freedom of expression under the Bill of Rights. This meant that his actions were not unlawful because the word dishonour in the Flags, Emblems and Names Protection Act had many shades of meaning, and when the least restrictive meaning of that word was adopted Hopkinson's actions did not meet that standard. This somewhat unusual result was due in part to the fact that the Bill of Rights does not overrule other laws (Hopkinson v Police).

In 2007, activist Valerie Morse had burned the New Zealand flag during an ANZAC Day dawn service in Wellington. She was fined NZ$500 by the Wellington District Court and her conviction was upheld by the High Court and the Court of Appeal. After Morse's lawyers appealed the conviction on the grounds that she was being punished for expressing ideas, the New Zealand Supreme Court ruled in 2011 that the previous rulings had misinterpreted the meaning of "offensive behavior" in the Summary Offences Act.

=== Nigeria ===
Any person who flies or exhibits the National Flag in a defaced or bad condition shall be guilty of an offence. It is punishable by a fine of ₦100 and in the case of a continuing offence to a fine of ₦10 for every day or part of a day during which the offence is continued after the day on which such person is first convicted.

=== North Macedonia ===
The desecration of the national flag, coat of arms or anthem and international flags, coat of arms or anthems is banned under Articles 178 and 181 in the Criminal Code of North Macedonia.

It is questionable if these laws are enforced as there have been many instances where the national and foreign flags were set on fire.

=== Norway ===
Desecration of foreign countries' flags or national coats of arms was previously banned according to the General Civil Penal Code §95. However, the ban had rarely been practiced, and was eventually lifted in 2008.

Comedian Otto Jespersen burned a U.S. flag during a satirical TV show in 2003. During the Jyllands-Posten Muhammad cartoons controversy, Norwegian flags were burned in demonstrations in various Muslim countries.

=== Pakistan ===
Pakistan's flag comes under the strict protection of various constitutional clauses. However, the statutes governing the topic consist only of Pakistan Flag Protocols and are unclear as with regards to legal status of the offender and the punishment under the Pakistan Penal Code.

=== Panama ===
On 9 January 1964, a dispute broke out between Panamanian students and Americans living in the Panama Canal Zone over the right of the flag of Panama to be raised next to the flag of the United States, as the Canal Zone was then a disputed territory between the two nations. During the scuffle a Panamanian flag carried by Panamanian students was torn. This sparked four days of riots that ended with 22 Panamanians and four Americans dead and with Panama breaking diplomatic relations with the United States. This event is considered very important in the decision to negotiate and sign the Torrijos-Carter Treaties, by whose terms the Panama Canal administration was handed over to the Panamanian Government at the end of 1999. 9 January is known as Martyrs' Day and is commemorated in Panama as a day of mourning.

=== Peru ===
The precise law in Peru is unclear, but such acts are clearly capable of causing outrage. In 2008, the dancer, model and actress Leysi Suárez appeared naked photographed using Peru's flag as a saddle while mounted on a horse. The country's defence minister said she would face charges that could put her in jail for up to four years for "offending patriotic symbols". However, the case was closed in 2010.

=== Philippines ===
Section 34a of the 1998 Flag and Heraldic Code of the Philippines declares that it is a prohibited act "to mutilate, deface, defile, trample on or cast contempt or commit any act or omission casting dishonor or ridicule upon the flag or over its surface".

Section 50 meanwhile declares, "Any person or judicial entity which violates any of the provisions of this Act shall, upon conviction, be punished by a fine of not less than five thousand pesos (₱5,000.00) not more than twenty thousand pesos (₱20,000.00), or by imprisonment for not more than one (1) year, or both such fine and imprisonment, at the discretion of the court: Provided, That for any second and additional offenses, both fine and imprisonment shall always be imposed: Provided, That in case the violation is committed by a juridical person, its President or Chief Executive Officer thereof shall be liable."

Flag burning is only permitted in the case of proper disposal of the flag.

A crucial point of etiquette for the Philippine flag is that flying it upside down (i.e., red field over blue), or vertically hanging it with the red to the viewer's left, makes it the national war standard. Outside of an official state of war, Filipinos consider this a major faux pas or a highly offensive act: several instances of this incorrect display (usually by foreigners) have attracted online backlash, prompting official apologies.

=== Poland ===
Polish Criminal Code (1997) declares:

Article 137. § 1. Whoever publicly insults, destroys, damages or removes an emblem, banner, standard, flag, ensign or other symbol of the State shall be subject to a fine, the penalty of restriction of liberty or the penalty of deprivation of liberty for up to one year.

§ 2. The same punishment shall be imposed on anyone, who on the territory of the Republic of Poland publicly insults, destroys, damages or removes an emblem, banner, standard, flag, ensign or other symbol of another State, publicly displayed by a mission of this State or upon an order of a Polish authority.

Article 138. § 1. The provisions of Articles 136 and 137 § 2 shall apply, when the foreign country ensures reciprocity.

=== Portugal ===
Currently, according to article 332 of the Penal Code, "Who publicly, by means of words, gestures or print publication, or by other means of public communication, insults the Republic, the Flag or the National Anthem, the coats of arms or the symbols of Portuguese sovereignty, or fails to show the respect they are entitled to, shall be punished with up to two years' imprisonment or a fine of up to 240 days". In the case of the regional symbols, the person shall be punished with up to one year's imprisonment or a fine of up to 120 days (fines are calculated based on the defendant's income).

The Portuguese Penal Code (article 323) also forbids the desecration of foreign symbols: "Who publicly, by means of words, gestures or print publication, or by other means of public communication, insults the official flag or other symbol of sovereignty of a foreign State or of an international organization of which Portugal is a member shall be punished with up to one year imprisonment or a fine of up to 120 days." This article applies under two conditions (article 324): that Portugal maintains diplomatic relations with the insulted country, and that there is reciprocity (i.e., that the insulted country would also punish any insult against Portuguese symbols of sovereignty, should they occur there).

=== Romania ===
The Romanian Criminal Code no longer prohibits flag desecration (as was the case with the previous criminal code). Several laws attempting to reinstate punishments for manifestations which express contempt for the Romanian symbols (according to the constitution, these are the flag, national day, anthem and coat-of-arms) have not been approved.

During the Romanian Revolution of 1989, the Communist era flag was flown with the coat of arms cut out, leaving a hole.

=== Russia ===
National flag burning is a crime in Russia, which is punishable by up to one year of imprisonment.

In February 2011, Japanese ultra-rightists held a protest over the Kuril Islands dispute outside of the Russian embassy in Tokyo, during which they dragged a Russian flag on the ground; Russian foreign minister Sergei Lavrov stated that his ministry had asked the Japanese government to launch a criminal case over the incident.

In 2013, the U.S. rock band Bloodhound Gang desecrated a Russian flag during a concert in Ukraine. In response, Vladimir Markin of the Investigative Committee of Russia said that his department was prepared to file criminal charges if prosecutors thought they had a case.

In 2025, a Russian streamer, Stepan Scoffy, was detained after desecrating his Russian flag over an online donation.

=== Samoa ===
The Official Flag and National Anthem of Samoa Act 1994 stipulates that any person "who by act, word or conduct wilfully offers an insult to the Flag of Samoa" may be fined or imprisoned for up to six months.

=== Saudi Arabia ===
The flag of Saudi Arabia bears the shahada (Islamic declaration of faith). Because the shahada is considered holy, even the slightest disrespect amounts to not only desecration but blasphemy. This has led to several incidents of controversy. In 1994, McDonald's printed carry-out bags bearing the flags of all nations participating in the FIFA World Cup (with a green flag with Saudi Arabia's coat of arms superimposed, rather than the Saudi flag), while Coca-Cola did the same on cans of soda. Because of Saudi Arabian objections, the companies stopped producing those items. Also during the FIFA World Cup, in 2002, Saudi Arabian officials protested against printing the flag on a football on the belief that kicking the creed with the foot was unacceptable.

Because of the shahada, even flying this flag at half-mast is considered desecration in Saudi Arabia. This also applies to the flags of Afghanistan and Somaliland, which also bear the shahada, as well as the flag of Iraq, which bears the takbir.

=== Serbia ===
In Serbia, flag desecration is illegal.

=== Singapore ===
In Singapore, flag desecration is illegal under the statuory of National Symbols Act 2022 and National Symbols Regulations 2023. Under current constitution, using the national symbol (such as Presidential symbols, state crests, national flag, public seals and national flowers) in a derogatory manner (including defacing, dirtying and obstructing some symbols like stars and crescents) also amounts to flag desecration, which enforces a stop-work order or a maximum penalty of S$30,000 or a six-month imprisonment or both (previously S$1,000).

=== Slovenia ===
In Slovenia, desecrating national symbols is a criminal offence. Article 163 of the Criminal Code (Kazenski zakonik, KZ-1) punishes anyone who publicly insults the flag, coat of arms or anthem of the Republic of Slovenia with a fine or imprisonment of up to one year. Article 164 extends the same penalty to public insult of the flag, coat of arms or anthem of a foreign state or an international organisation recognised by Slovenia.

=== South Africa ===
During the apartheid era, protesters would burn the former South African flag in protest against the apartheid policies of the South African government. In one example, Americans opposed to apartheid burned the old South African flag at an anti-apartheid protest in the U.S. state of Massachusetts during the mid-1980s. South Africans opposed to minority rule also burned the (now former) South African flag, viewing it as a symbol of the country's government at the time. Under the 1983 constitution desecration of the flag was a criminal offense punishable by up to five years' imprisonment.

In post-apartheid South Africa there is no law against flag desecration yet. The current South African flag designed and adopted in 1994 has been the subject of desecration. In early 1994, white supremacists from the "Afrikaner Volksfront" organization burned the new South African flag in Bloemfontein in protest against the country's pending democratization.

=== South Korea ===
The South Korean Criminal Act punishes flag desecration, of both domestic and foreign, in various ways:

- Article 105 imposes up to five years in prison, disfranchisement of up to ten years, or a fine up to seven million won for damaging, removing, or staining a South Korean flag or emblem with intent to insult the South Korean state. Article 5 makes this crime punishable even if done by aliens outside South Korea.
- Article 106 imposes up to one year in prison, disfranchisement of up to five years, or a fine up to two million won for defaming a South Korean flag or emblem with intent to insult the South Korean state. Article 5 makes this crime punishable even if done by aliens outside South Korea.
- Article 109 imposes up to two years in prison or a fine up to three million won for damaging, removing, or staining a foreign flag or emblem with intent to insult a foreign country. Article 110 forbids prosecution without foreign governmental complaint.

The desecration of the national flag in South Korea by the country's own citizens is rare when compared to analogous instances in other countries as the flag is viewed more along the lines of an ethnic flag rather than merely just the flag of a state.

=== Soviet Union ===
The flag of the Soviet Union was burned many times by protestors against its government's policies, for instance in Brazil by those protesting the Warsaw Pact invasion of Czechoslovakia of 1968, and in New York City in 1985 by protesters against the Soviet–Afghan War. The Soviet flag was burned or otherwise desecrated during the Euromaidan in Ukraine.

=== Spain ===
The Spanish Penal Code punishes insulting the flag of Spain and the flags of the autonomous communities of Spain with a fine that can range from €420 to €144,000. However, flag burning is often seen in nationalist demonstrations.

=== Suriname ===
Article 176a of the Surinamese criminal code imposes up to 6 months of imprisonment to "He who intentionally expresses himself regarding the flag of Suriname in a manner offensive to national sentiments".

=== Sweden ===
In Swedish law, there is no explicit prohibition against burning the flag of any country. The desecration of the national flag was decriminalized in 1971. However, publicly showing a Swedish flag modified with added marks, characters or symbols is forbidden according flag law number 1982:269, and may be punishable under the provisions regarding disorderly conduct (förargelseväckande beteende) under the chapter 16 § 16 of the criminal code.

In 1997 a teenager who identified as a skinhead was fined 500kr for waving a large, modified Swedish flag from the top of a hill during an event celebrating Sweden's National Day. The motifs that had been added to the flag in question were those of a sun wheel, an axe, a viking warrior's head in profile and the word "Valhalla". The royal family being present, the event being part of the city of Lycksele's 50 year jubilee, and the act of standing on the hill to increase the number of people who could see the flag, were all seen as contributing factors in the sentence.

=== Switzerland ===
The destruction, removal, or desecration of national emblems installed by a public authority (i.e., the Swiss flag, the Swiss coat of arms, the cantonal or municipal flags and coats of arms) is punishable by fines or up to three years of imprisonment according to the Swiss federal penal code. However, the destruction or desecration of privately owned flags or coats of arms is legal.

=== Taiwan ===
Under Articles 118 and 160 of the Criminal Law of the Republic of China (Taiwan), it is a criminal offence to insult either the national flag or the national emblem of any country. If it is a national flag or emblem of a foreign country being insulted, the name of the offence would be 'obstructing state diplomacy'; if it is the ones of the Republic of China (Taiwan), the offence would be 'disturbing the order'. Besides, insulting or damaging the portrait of Sun Yat-sen is also punishable as 'disturbing the order'. The penalty can be either incarceration for up to one year, or a fine of $9,000 NTD or less.

=== Thailand ===
In October 2018, Prime Minister Prayut Chan-o-cha ordered the Foreign Ministry to investigate fashion footwear in Paris that incorporates the colours of the Thai national flag. Photos of the shoes, shown on the Vogue Paris Facebook page taken during Paris Fashion Week, outraged Thai social media users, some of whom demanded apologies and jail sentences for the perpetrators. As was pointed out in the Bangkok daily, The Nation, "The combination of the Thai flag and human feet is a contentious cultural cocktail for Thais."

The designers are immune from prosecution as the shoes were made and displayed outside Thailand. Were the offence committed in Thailand, those responsible could face a 2,000 baht fine or a year in jail.

A spokesman at the Thai National Flag Museum commented that no one has a copyright on the flag's colours or the order in which they are presented.

=== Turkey ===
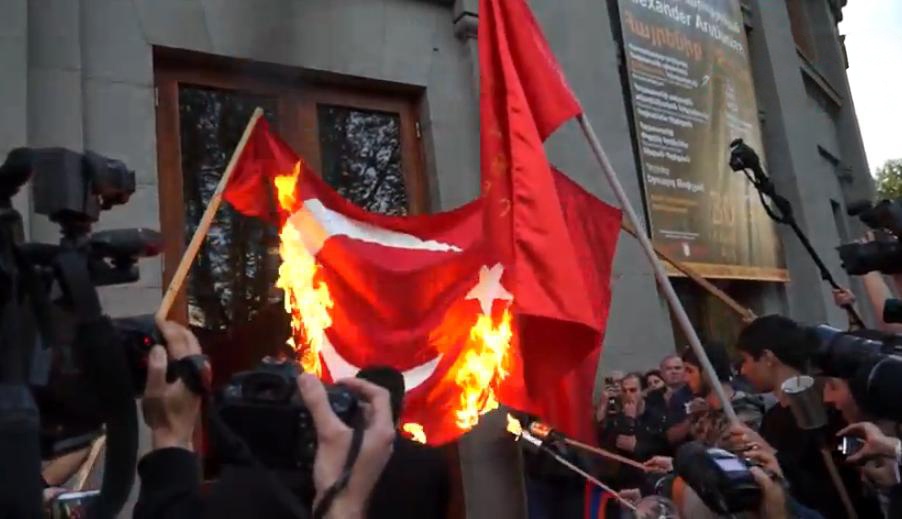
The Turkish flag being burnt in Freedom Square, Yerevan

Under the 2004 Turkish penal law, burning the flag of any nation in the world (including Turkey itself) is strictly forbidden, resulting in a prison sentence of one to three years for the flag of Turkey or three months to one year for the flags of other nations. Displaying or pulling a torn or discolored flag to flagpole is also illegal.

=== Ukraine ===
In Ukraine, the desecration of national symbols, including the national flag, is a crime punishable by up to one year of imprisonment.

=== United Arab Emirates ===
In the United Arab Emirates, publicly insulting or desecrating the flag of the United Arab Emirates, as well as the flags of its seven emirates, the Gulf Cooperation Council or any foreign country is illegal and punishable by between ten and 25 years in prison and a fine of no less than 500,000 Emirati dirhams.

=== United Kingdom ===
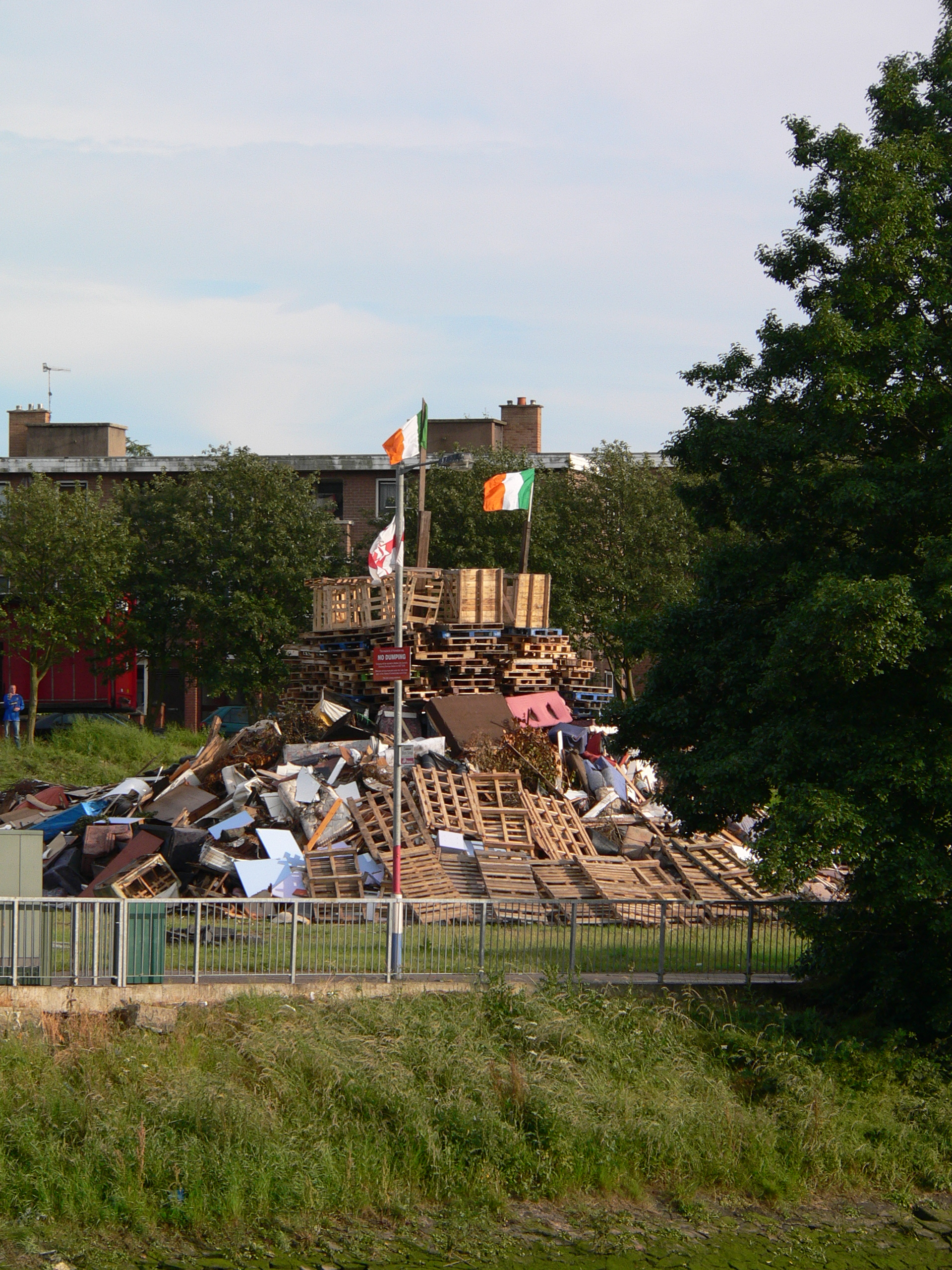
Ulster loyalists prepare to burn the Irish flag on a bonfire on the eve of The Twelfth in Belfast.

The law of England and Wales and the law of Scotland have no specific concept of "flag desecration". Flag desecration is not illegal in the United Kingdom.

In May 1998, in a protest by 2,000 former prisoners of war, a Burma Railway veteran torched the Rising Sun banner before both Emperor Akihito and Queen Elizabeth. Police were persuaded by the crowd not to arrest him. A year later, two "committed socialists" threw a burning British flag in the direction of the Queen's motor vehicle. They were arrested for a breach of the peace offence, subsequently pleaded guilty and were fined a total of £450. In 2001 at RAF Feltwell, home of United States Air Force's 5th Space Surveillance Squadron, a protester desecrated a U.S. flag with the words "Stop Star Wars" before stepping in front of a vehicle and stomping on the flag. On appeal by case stated the Administrative Court found that her conviction for "using threatening, abusive and insulting words or behaviour likely to cause harassment, alarm or distress" contrary to section 5 of the Public Order Act 1986 was overturned as incompatible with Article 10 of the European Convention on Human Rights.

In 2011, a group of approximately 20–30 students at King's College, Cambridge influenced the burning of a large British flag, the centerpiece of the Student Union's decorations to celebrate the wedding of Prince William and Catherine Middleton. King's College Student Union condemned the action as a "needlessly divisive and violent way to make a political point ... [the] Union flag is a symbol and therefore can mean different things to different people in different contexts."

The Union Flag has also been burned by Argentine nationalists protesting British sovereignty of the Falkland Islands.

In 2006, to allow greater police control over extremist protesters, 17 MPs signed a House of Commons motion calling for burning of the British flag to be made a criminal offence.

==== Northern Ireland ====
Unlike the rest of the United Kingdom, the law in Northern Ireland has varied since its foundation in 1921. The British flag, the former flag of Northern Ireland, and the Irish flag are often desecrated or burnt in Northern Ireland by various groups as a political statement/provocation or in protest.

Also in Northern Ireland, Ulster loyalists have sometimes mistakenly desecrated the Ivorian flag, erroneously mistaking it for the Irish one as the two are somewhat similar in appearance. In some cases, Ivorian flags displayed in Northern Ireland have signs explicitly labeling them as such displayed nearby to avoid having them desecrated by Ulster loyalists mistaking them for Irish ones.

=== United States ===
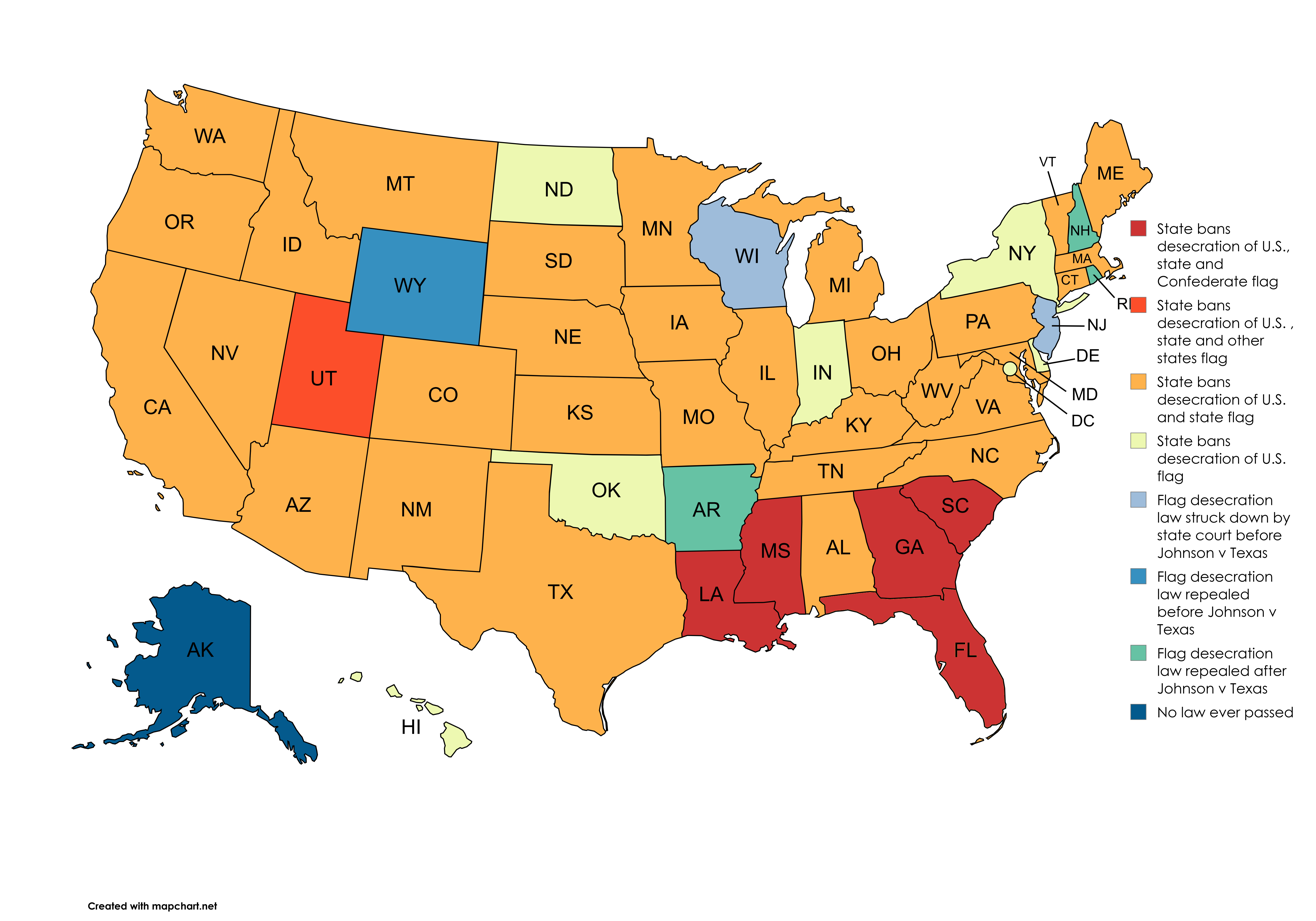
A 2025 map of flag desecration laws in the United States, unenforceable since Texas v. Johnson

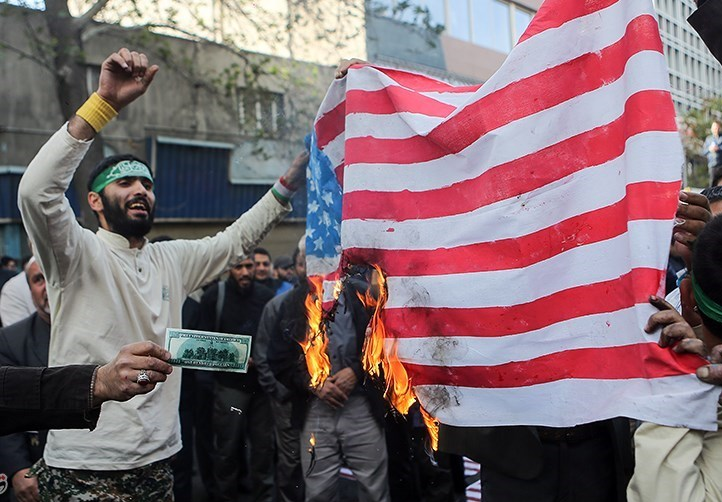
Iranian protesters burning the flag of the United States in Tehran, November 2018

Flag desecration is not a crime in the United States. The flag of the United States is sometimes burned as a cultural or political statement, in protest of the policies of the U.S. government, or for other reasons, both within the U.S. and abroad. The United States Supreme Court in Texas v. Johnson, 491 U.S. 397 (1989), and reaffirmed in U.S. v. Eichman, 496 U.S. 310 (1990), has ruled that due to the First Amendment to the United States Constitution, it is unconstitutional for a government (whether federal, state, or municipal) to prohibit the desecration of a flag, due to its status as "symbolic speech".

However, content-neutral restrictions may still be imposed to regulate the time, place, and manner of such expression. If the flag that was burned was someone else's property (as it was in the Johnson case, since Johnson had stolen the flag from a Texas bank's flagpole), the offender could be charged with petty larceny (a flag usually sells at retail for less than US$20), or with destruction of private property, or possibly both. Desecration of a flag representing a minority group may also be used in some jurisdictions to support the prosecution of a crime as a hate crime.

In the American Civil War, the U.S. flag was flown by the Union against the Confederacy. Union Army general Benjamin Franklin Butler ordered the 1862 execution for treason of William B. Mumford, who had removed a Union flag in occupied New Orleans. An apocryphal tale of Barbara Fritchie preventing Confederate soldiers dishonoring her Union flag was propagated by John Greenleaf Whittier's 1863 poem "Barbara Frietchie", which contains the famous lines:

"Shoot, if you must, this old gray head,
But spare your country's flag," she said.

During the United States' involvement in the Vietnam War, American flags were sometimes burned during war protest demonstrations.

The Flag Protection Act was passed, protecting flags from anyone who "mutilates, defaces, physically defiles, burns, maintains on the floor or ground, or tramples upon any flag". This law was later struck down in the Eichman decision. After that case, several flag burning amendments to the Constitution were proposed.

In June 2005, a Flag Desecration Amendment was passed by the House with the needed two-thirds majority. In June 2006, another attempt to pass a ban on flag burning was rejected by the Senate, in a close vote of 66 in favor and 34 opposed, one vote short of the two-thirds majority needed to send the amendment to be voted on by the states. Bob Bennett introduced the Flag Protection Act of 2005, cosponsored by Hillary Clinton, Barbara Boxer, Tom Carper and Mark Pryor.

There have been several proposed Flag Desecration Amendments to the Constitution of the United States that would allow Congress to enact laws to prohibit flag desecration:

- Douglas Applegate (Ohio) in 1991
- Spencer Bachus (Alabama) in 2013
- Steve Daines (Montana) in 2019
- Robert Dornan (California) in 1991
- Bill Emerson (Missouri) in 1991, 1993, 1995
- Randy Cunningham (California) in 1999, 2001, 2003,
- Jo Ann Emerson (Missouri) in 1997, 1999, 2001, 2003, 2005, 2007, 2009, 2011, 2013
- John P. Hammerschmidt (Arkansas), 1991
- Orrin Hatch (Utah) in 1995, 1998, 1999, 2001, 2003, 2005, 2011, 2013
- Andrew Jacobs Jr. (Indiana) in 1995
- Joseph M. McDade (Pennsylvania) in 1989, 1995, 1996
- Clarence E. Miller (Ohio) in 1991
- John Murtha (Pennsylvania) in 2007
- Ron Paul (Texas) in 1997, but he opposed any federal prohibition of flag desecration, including his own Flag Desecration Amendment which he proposed only as a protest against proposals by his Congressional colleagues, such as Emerson and Solomon, to ban flag desecration through ordinary legislation instead of by Constitutional Amendment.
- Gerald B. H. Solomon (New York) in 1991, 1993, 1995, 1997
- Floyd Spence (South Carolina) in 1991
- David Vitter (Louisiana) in 2009

Donald Trump at a "Roundtable on ANTIFA", "We took the freedom of speech away because that's been through the courts, and the courts said, You have freedom of speech. But what has happened is when they burn a flag, it agitates and irritates crowds, I've never seen anything like it, on both sides, and you end up with riots. So we're going on that basis. We're looking at it, not from the freedom of speech, which I always felt strongly about, but never passed the courts. This is what they do, when you burn an American flag, you incite tremendous violence."

During a rally in June 2020, president Donald Trump told supporters that he believed flag burning would be punishable by one year of imprisonment. In August 2025, Trump signed Executive Order 14341 directing the Justice Department to prosecute flag burners with acts of harm unrelated to the First Amendment, such as incitement of riots. However, the executive order he signed has failed to ban flag burning.

At the 2026 Delaney Hall protests, protesters burned an American flag. Shortly after, multiple Immigration and Customs Enforcement (ICE) agents began "running towards protesters and tackling several to the ground" and pepper spraying them.

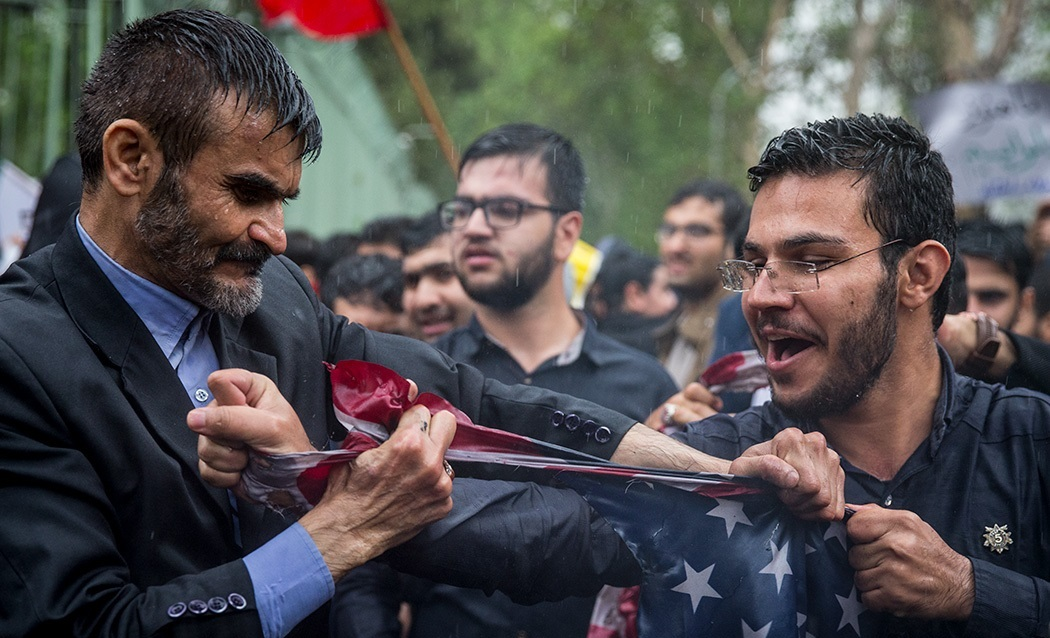
Two protesters in Iran tearing an American flag at an anti-American rally after the American withdrawal from the Joint Comprehensive Plan

In common usage, the phrase "flag burning" refers only to burning a flag as an act of protest. However, the United States Flag Code states that "the flag, when it is in such condition that it is no longer a fitting emblem for display (for example, the flag being faded or torn), should be destroyed in a dignified way, preferably by burning."

==== Confederate flag ====
The Battle Flag of the Army of Northern Virginia, commonly referred to as the Confederate flag, has sometimes been burned in protest as well. In 2000, protesters from the Jewish Defense League burned Confederate and Nazi flags to protest an arson attempt against a synagogue in Reno, Nevada. This was criticized by a representative of the Anti-Defamation League, who said that it was more effective to work with the police and other authorities rather than to engage in "tactics which inflame and exacerbate situations".

Of the states which continue to have laws against flag burning, in spite of them being ruled unconstitutional, five afford this protection to the Virginian battle flag as well: Florida, Georgia, Louisiana, Mississippi, and South Carolina.

=== Uruguay ===
Desecration of foreign national flags is punished by the article 139 of the Penal Code:

Article 139 (Disrespect of foreign emblems) Whoever, in the territory of the State, disrespects, in a public place or in a place open or exposed to the public, the flag or any other emblem of a foreign State, shall be punished with six months of imprisonment to three years of penitentiary.

There is no restriction in place for the desecration of the Uruguayan national flag.

=== Uzbekistan ===
In Uzbekistan, desecration of state symbols, including the national flag of Uzbekistan or Karakalpakstan, emblem, or anthem, is punishable under Article 215 of the Criminal Code with fines, community service, or correctional labor for up to three years. Additionally, Article 203 of the Administrative Code imposes fines for violating legislation on state symbols, with stricter penalties for repeat offenses.

=== Venezuela ===
Since the demonstrations against the refusal by the government to renew the broadcasting license of RCTV (a major TV network), the upside-down flag of Venezuela has been adopted as a symbol of protest for this and other alleged threats to civil liberties. Demonstrators claim that it is a sign of distress and a call for help. However, government and ruling-party officials insist that these demonstrators are desecrating the flag. An official video sharply criticizing this practice as disrespectful was produced. Globovisión prepended to the video a statement denouncing the message as violative of the Law on Social Responsibility on Radio and Television, "for constituting anonymous official propaganda".
