= Senator Leedy =

Senator Leedy may refer to:

- James K. Leedy (1924–1983), Ohio State Senate
- John W. Leedy (1849–1935), Kansas State Senate
- Robert Franklin Leedy (1863–1924), Virginia State Senate
