= Anti-Flag Desecration Law (Germany) =

German law

The Anti-Flag Desecration Law of 1932 banned flag desecration by "insulting or maliciously and with intent belittling" the German Reich, its states, their constitution, colors, or flags, or the Wehrmacht. The law was not a Nazi law; it was an amendment to the German criminal code, signed into law as an emergency decree in the Weimar Republic on 19 December 1932 by President Paul von Hindenburg and the cabinet of Chancellor Kurt von Schleicher. A revised form of the law is still in effect today.

2:3 Flag of Weimar Germany (1919–33)

Initially, §134a StGB protected only the flag of the democratic Germany.

Later legislation, on 12 March 1933, and the Reichsflaggengesetz of 15 September 1935, extended the protection to the Nazi flag.

== Paragraph introduced by von Hindenburg on 19 December 1932 ==
§134a StGB:

   § 134a. Wer öffentlich das Reich oder eines der Länder, ihre Verfassung, 
   ihre Farben oder Flaggen oder die deutsche Wehrmacht beschimpft 
   oder böswillig und mit Überlegung verächtlich macht, 
   wird mit Gefängnis bestraft.

=== Case studies of §134a application ===
==== 21 December 1934: Defendant acquitted of desecrating SS flag ====
On 21 December 1934, a defendant accused of desecrating the SS flag was acquitted, because the insignia of a sub-organisation of the NSDAP were not considered protected under §134a StGB.

==== 26 July 1935: New York demonstrators acquitted of tearing down NSDAP flag ====
On 26 July 1935 in New York a group of demonstrators boarded the SS Bremen, tore the Nazi party flag from the jackstaff and threw it into the Hudson River. The German ambassador sharply protested, but the protest was rejected, with the judgement that only a party symbol was harmed and the national flag was not affected. On 15 September 1935, in response to this incident, the Reichsflaggengesetz (Reichs flag law) (RGBl. I S. 1145) came into effect (see below), declaring the Nazi flag to be the exclusive national flag of Germany and removing the status of the black-white-red tricolor flag of the German Empire as co-national flag.

== Laws specifying which flag is the German national flag ==
=== Black-red-white flag reintroduced and Nazi flag introduced on 12 March 1933 ===
3:5 National flag of Germany (1933–35), jointly with the swastika flag.

3:5 National flag of Germany and marine jack of Germany (1935–45)

After the Nazi Party seized power on 30 January 1933, the black-red-gold flag was swiftly scrapped; a ruling on 12 March established two legal national flags: the reintroduced black-white-red imperial tricolour and the flag of the Nazi Party.

=== Reichsflaggengesetz, 15 September 1935 ===
The Reichsflaggengesetz that declared the Hakenkreuzfahne as the only national flag was announced at the annual party rally in Nuremberg on 15 September 1935.

== Current (as of 1 January 1975) version of the Anti-Flag Desecration Law ==
3:5 Flag of the Federal Republic of Germany (1949–present) Flag of the German Democratic Republic (1949–59)

§90a StGB

   § 90a. Verunglimpfung des Staates und seiner Symbole.
   (1) Wer öffentlich, in einer Versammlung oder durch Verbreiten von Schriften
       1. die Bundesrepublik Deutschland oder eines ihrer Länder oder ihre verfassungsmäßige Ordnung 
          beschimpft oder böswillig verächtlich macht 
       oder
       2. die Farben, die Flagge, das Wappen oder die Hymne der Bundesrepublik Deutschland 
          oder eines ihrer Länder verunglimpft,
       wird mit Freiheitsstrafe bis zu drei Jahren oder mit Geldstrafe bestraft.
   (2) [1] Ebenso wird bestraft, wer eine öffentlich gezeigte Flagge der Bundesrepublik Deutschland oder eines ihrer Länder 
       oder ein von einer Behörde öffentlich angebrachtes Hoheitszeichen der Bundesrepublik Deutschland oder eines ihrer Länder 
       entfernt, zerstört, beschädigt, unbrauchbar oder unkenntlich macht oder beschimpfenden Unfug daran verübt. 
       [2] Der Versuch ist strafbar.
   (3) Die Strafe ist Freiheitsstrafe bis zu fünf Jahren oder Geldstrafe, 
       wenn der Täter sich durch die Tat absichtlich für Bestrebungen 
       gegen den Bestand der Bundesrepublik Deutschland oder gegen Verfassungsgrundsätze einsetzt.

== See also ==
- Insult of officials and the state
