= Hopkinson v Police =

Legal case in New Zealand

- Court: Wellington High Court
- Decided: 23 July 2004
- Citation: [2004] 3 NZLR 704

Court membership
- Judge sitting: Ellen France J

Keywords
- Criminal law, Flag desecration, New Zealand Bill of Rights Act 1990

Hopkinson v Police was a successful appeal by a protester convicted for the offence of burning the New Zealand flag with the intention of dishonouring it. The case is notable because of the High Court's interpretation of the Flags, Emblems, and Names Protection Act 1981 in a manner consistent with the Bill of Rights Act 1990. Justice Ellen France held that "the prohibition of flag burning under the Act was a breach of the right to freedom of expression, and such a limit was not justified under s 5 of the Bill of Rights."

== Background ==
On 10 March 2003 between 500 and 1000 people marched through central Wellington in protest at a visit of Australian Prime Minister John Howard to the New Zealand Parliament. The protest was against the Australian Government's support for the United States-led invasion of Iraq. During the protest Hopkinson held the New Zealand flag on a pole upside down and a Mr Phillips lit the flag with a cigarette lighter resulting in a fireball and a column of flame 2 metres high.

As a result of the protest, far-left extremist Paul Hopkinson became the first person to be prosecuted under the Flags, Emblems, and Names Protection Act 1981 after burning a New Zealand flag at an anti-war protest in March 2003. Hopkinson was convicted in November in the Wellington District Court of an offence under s 11(1)(b) of the Flags, Emblems, and Names Protection Act 1981; destroying the New Zealand flag with the intention of dishonouring it. Judge Noble ruled that Hopkinson had deliberately disrespected the flag to gain attention as he "sought to add weight to the effects of the protest".

Hopkinson appealed the conviction on the basis that the District Court had failed to correctly interpret the Flags, Emblems and Names Protection Act 1981 in a manner consistent with the right to freedom of expression and of peaceful assembly under ss 14 and 16 of the Bill of Rights Act 1990.

== Judgment ==
Section 6 of the Bill of Rights required the Court to adopt a meaning of the word "dishonour" that could be read consistently with the Bill of Rights. Justice Ellen France held,

[81] Looking at the statutory scheme as a whole, there is some support for the respondent's view that there is just the one tenable meaning, namely, that adopted by the District Court Judge. However, the better view is that the statute does allow of the narrower meaning of “vilify”. If that meaning is adopted, as s 6 of the Bill of Rights demands that it must, I consider s 11(1)(b) can be read consistently with the Bill of Rights. However, I do not accept the respondent's submission that the appellant's conduct would fall foul of this narrower definition of “dishonour”, that is, one limited to dishonour in the sense of vilifying. That would have required some additional action on the appellant's part beyond a symbolic burning of the flag. My decision is of course confined to this particular appellant's conduct. What other conduct may come within this narrower interpretation of “dishonour” is a matter for a different case.

[82] On this basis, that is, that the prohibition on the appellant's conduct is not a justified limit on the right to freedom of expression and does not come within the proper Bill of Rights consistent interpretation of s 11(1)(b), the appellant's conviction cannot stand.

== See also ==
- New Zealand Bill of Rights Act 1990
