= Douglas Applegate =

American politician (1928–2021)

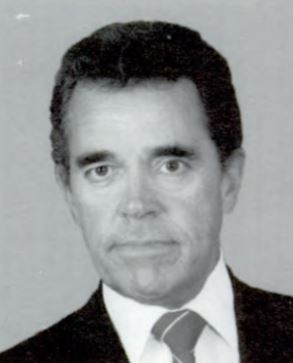
- Applegate in 1993

Member of the U.S. House of Representatives from Ohio's 18th district
- In office January 3, 1977 – January 3, 1995
- Preceded by: Wayne Hays
- Succeeded by: Bob Ney

Member of the Ohio Senate from the 30th district
- In office 1969–1977
- Preceded by: John Longsworth
- Succeeded by: Kinsey Milleson

Member of the Ohio House of Representatives
- In office 1961–1969 Serving with Michael Blischak (1961–1963)
- Preceded by: District established (33rd district)
- Succeeded by: Arthur Bowers
- Constituency: Jefferson County (1961–1967); 33rd district (1967–1969)

Personal details
- Born: Douglas Earl Applegate; March 27, 1928 Steubenville, Ohio, U.S.
- Died: August 7, 2021 (aged 93) Spring Hill, Florida, U.S.
- Party: Democratic
- Spouse: Betty
- Children: 2

Douglas Earl Applegate (March 27, 1928 – August 7, 2021) was an American politician who served in the United States House of Representatives from Ohio's 18th congressional district from 1977 to 1995, as a member of the Democratic Party. Prior to his tenure in the United States House of Representatives he served in the Ohio House of Representatives from 1961 to 1968, and in the Ohio Senate from 1969 to 1974.

Applegate was born in Steubenville, Ohio, the son of mayor and state representative Earl Applegate, and was educated at Steubenville High School. He was elected to the state house in the 1960 election alongside Michael Blischak in a multi-member district and later became the sole representative from the district after defeating Blischak in 1962. He served in the state house until his election to the state senate in the 1968 election. During his tenure in the state senate he defeated incumbent Republican senators John Longsworth and Kenneth F. Berry.

Applegate had planned on running to succeed Wayne Hays in the U.S. House of Representatives in the 1978 election, but was selected to replace Hays as the Democratic nominee in the 1976 election after Hays resignation. He served until his retirement in the 1994 election during which he served on the Transportation, Public Works, and Veterans' Affairs committees. His ideological belief and ratings were mixed and ranged from liberal to conservative with the Americans for Democratic Action giving him scores between 5% and 80% while the American Conservative Union gave him scores ranging from 12.50% to 64.86%.

Applegate ran for the Democratic presidential nomination in the 1988 primary as a favorite son. He only sought the six delegates from his districts, of which he won one, and voted for Michael Dukakis at the Democratic National Convention. He attempted to have Senator John Glenn, whom he had supported in the 1984 primary, be given the vice-presidential nomination, but was unsuccessful. Applegate died in 2021.

== Early life and education ==
Douglas Earl Applegate was born in Steubenville, Ohio, on March 27, 1928, to Earl Applegate, who served as mayor of Steubenville and in the Ohio House of Representatives. He graduated from Steubenville High School in 1947, and became a licensed real estate broker in 1956. Applegate had two children with his wife Betty. He was a Presbyterian.

== Career ==
=== Ohio legislature ===
==== Elections ====
Applegate and Michael Blischak were given the Democratic nomination to run for seats in the Ohio House of Representatives in the 1960 election and defeated Republican nominees Ed Griffith and William G. Powell. On January 19, 1962, Applegate announced that he would run for reelection and as the multi-member district was eliminated he ran in the Democratic primary against Blischak. He defeated Blischak in the primary and won reelection against Republican nominee Edward V. Miller in the general election. He won reelection in 1964 and 1966.

Applegate announced on January 29, 1968, that he would seek the Democratic nomination for a seat in the Ohio Senate from the 30th district. He defeated former Senator Danny D. Johnson, former Representative Joseph Loha, and former Representative Stuart Henderson in the Democratic primary. He defeated incumbent Republican Senator John Longsworth in the general election, being the only person in Ohio to defeat an incumbent state senator in the 1968 election, after spending $2,585.53 during the campaign.

Following the 1972 reapportionment of districts Applegate's 30th district was redrawn to include Republican Senator Kenneth F. Berry, who was originally from the 19th district. Berry won renomination in the Republican primary against William A. Wallace while Applegate faced no opposition. Applegate defeated Berry in the general election.

==== Tenure ====
In 1963, Applegate was selected to serve on the twelve-member House Democratic Policy committee. During his tenure in the state house he served on the Elections and Federal Relations, Health, and Reference committees. During his tenure in the state senate he served on the Commerce, Finance, Finance and Elections, Labor, and Ways and Means committees. The Energy and Environment committee was created in 1974, and Applegate was selected to chair the committee.

Minority Leader Anthony O. Calabrese appointed Applegate to a five-member Democratic advisory committee to determine which Democratic senators would be placed onto committees for the 110th General Assembly. During his tenure he served on the Ohio Controlling Board, Ohio Constitutional Revision Commission, Legislative Service Commission, and the Agriculture and Conservation committees. In 1970, he was selected by Calabrese to serve as Assistant Minority Leader.

Applegate served as an at-large delegate from the Ohio's 18th congressional district to the 1964 Democratic National Convention and served as a member of the sixteen-member delegation, nine from the Ohio Senate and seven from the Ohio House of Representatives, to the second inauguration of Lyndon B. Johnson. He served as the campaign manager of Michael E. Entinger's primary campaign for the Democratic nomination for Ohio State Treasurer in 1966.

Applegate supported Representative Wayne Hays during the 1970 gubernatorial election and wanted to be the Democratic nominee for lieutenant governor. Applegate was one of the candidates included in a straw poll conducted by the Democratic Party in Clark County which was won by Robert E. Cecile. Anthony O. Calabrese Jr. won the lieutenant gubernatorial nomination, but lost in the general election to Republican nominee John William Brown.

In 1965, Applegate was named as one of America's outstanding young men by the U.S Junior Chamber of Commerce and was also nominated for the Ohio League of Young Democrat Clubs for their John F. Kennedy award.

=== U.S. House of Representatives ===
==== Elections ====
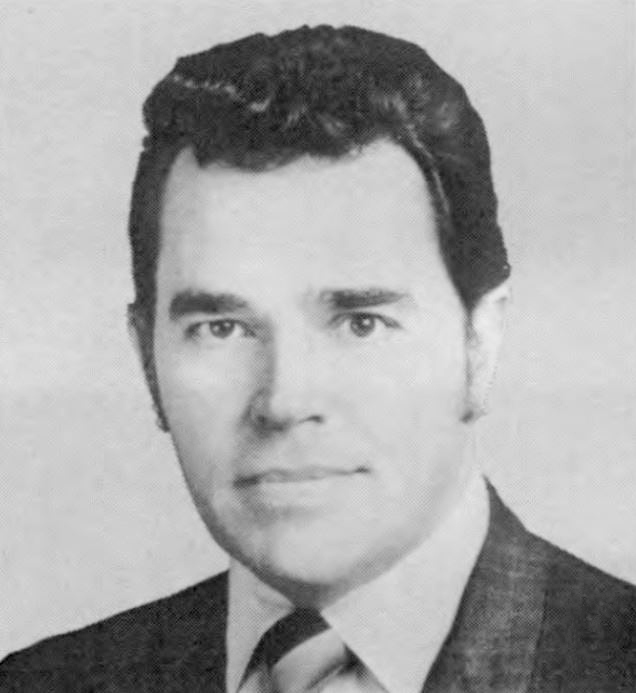
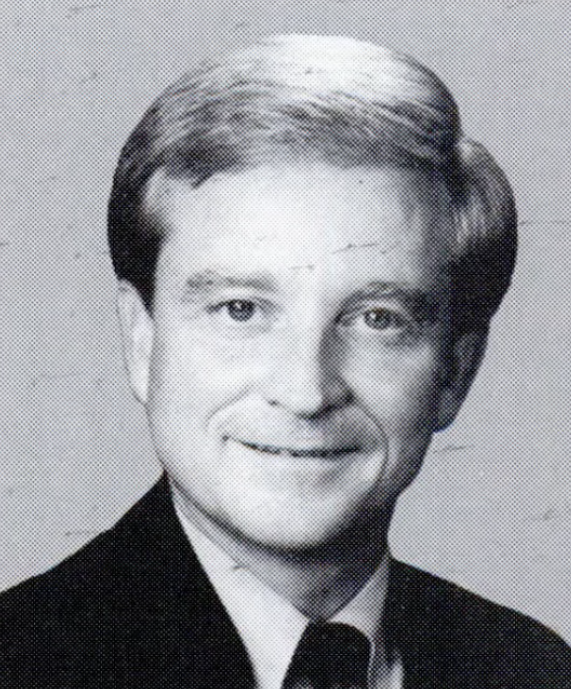
Douglas Applegate during his early tenure in the House (left); Bob Ney (right) was elected to succeed him in the 1994 election

Applegate announced in 1975, that he would run for a seat in the United States House of Representatives from the 18th congressional district in the 1978 election after Representative Hays announced that he would run for governor in the 1978 election. Hays withdrew from the 1976 election following a sex scandal and later resigned from the house. Fourteen of the eighteen Democratic leaders in the 18th congressional district voted in favor of Applegate, who was running against Alan Sherry and Joseph Loha, to replace Hays on the first ballot and then voted unanimously on the second ballot to give the nomination to Applegate on August 16. Applegate initially sought reelection to the state senate in the 1976 election, but Kinsey Milleson was later selected to replace him following Applegate's replacement of Hays.

Representative John Wargo accused Applegate of having been selected by Hays to succeed himself, but Applegate stated that Wargo was overreacting and that he had no political debts to Hays. He selected former Representative Robert T. Secrest to serve as his honorary campaign chair. Applegate defeated Republican nominee Ralph R. McCoy and independent candidate William Crabbe, who was the mayor of Steubenville, in the 1976 election.

Applegate announced that he would seek reelection on January 13, 1978, and won against Republican nominee Bill Ress. Hays, who had been elected to the state house, considered running against Applegate in the 1980 Democratic primary, but chose not to citing his health and pleas from Applegate's supporters. He defeated Republican nominee Gary L. Hammersley in the 1980 election.

Applegate won reelection in the 1982 election against Joseph Holmes' write-in candidacy. He defeated Republican nominee Kenneth Burt Jr. in the 1984 election. Applegate defeated Michael Palmer, a follower of Lyndon LaRouche, in the 1986 Democratic primary and faced no opposition in the general election. He defeated Republican nominee William C. Abraham in the 1988 election. He filed for reelection on February 14, 1990, and defeated Republican nominee John Hales in the 1990 election. He defeated Ress in the 1992 election.

Applegate announced that he would not seek reelection on January 3, 1994. His decision made him the twenty-fourth incumbent in the House of Representatives to announce that they would not seek reelection in the 1994 elections. He formed a political action committee to use the remaining $150,186 in his campaign funds. He served as the honorary chair of Jim Hart's, who was his chief of staff, campaign to succeed him in the house. His district was targeted by the National Republican Congressional Committee and Republican nominee Bob Ney defeated Democratic nominee Greg DiDonato in the election.

Campaign finance	1976	1980	1982	1984	1986	1988	1990	1992
Applegate raised	$20,073	$62,970	$64,369	$90,282	$104,752	$120,435	$125,772	$117,262
Applegate expenditure	N/A	$44,493	$50,572	$59,423	$83,591	$86,061	$94,754	$102,335
Opponents raised	McCoy:$12,218; Crabbe:$8,796	Hammersley:$26,697	N/A	Burt:$1,995	N/A	Abraham:$7,233	N/A	Ress:$27,288
Opponents expenditure	N/A	Hammersley:$26,755	N/A	Burt:$1,894	N/A	Abraham:$7,095	N/A	Ress:$26,810
Reference								

==== Tenure ====
1972–1982

1982–1992

1992–2002

The district shape of the Ohio's 18th congressional district during Applegate's tenure

During Applegate's tenure in the house he served on the Transportation, Public Works and Veterans' Affairs committees. He sought a position on the Veterans' Affairs committee at the urging of Robert T. Secrest, who served as his campaign manager and on the committee during his tenure in the house. When he was appointed to the Veterans' Affairs committee in 1977, he replaced James V. Stanton, who had left to unsuccessfully run for the Democratic senatorial nomination. He served as the chair of the Transportation Subcommittee on Water Resources and Environment.

Applegate and Representatives Charles Vanik, Don Pease, Mary Rose Oakar, and Tom Luken lobbied for Thomas L. Ashley to be given the position of chair of the Budget committee for the 95th United States Congress. In 1978, the Lorain Journal and Mansfield News Journal ranked Applegate as one of the five least effective members of Ohio's house delegation alongside Charles J. Carney, Samuel L. Devine, Tennyson Guyer, and Del Latta. He served as the chair of the Ohio Democratic congressional delegation during the 96th United States Congress until he asked for Louis Stokes to take over for him.

Applegate chose to stay neutral during the 1980 Democratic presidential primary between President Jimmy Carter and Ted Kennedy and hoped to attend the Democratic National Convention as an uncommitted delegate. He proposed a plank to the Democratic platform calling for the increased use of coal to reduce the United States' dependence on oil from other countries. He supported Senator John Glenn during the 1984 Democratic presidential primary.

=== Presidential campaign ===
The results of the 1988 Democratic primary in Ohio Michael Dukakis Jesse Jackson

Applegate proposed a favorite son coalition with Representative James Traficant to bring a focus on regional issues during the 1988 Democratic presidential primary stating that "our districts are contiguous and our problems are parallel". Both men would run to gain the delegates from their congressional districts. Ohio Secretary of State Sherrod Brown stated that candidates would be allowed to appear on the presidential and other ballot lines. He ruled that despite laws preventing a candidate's name from appearing on the ballot twice the presidential ballot line did not count as the voters were voting for delegates and not the candidate themselves.

Applegate announced on November 23, 1987, that he would run for president although he stated that "I don't have any great illusions of being sworn in as president of the United States" and would instead focus on winning the six delegates from his district. Norma Agostini, the chair of the Harrison County Democratic Party, supported Applegate's campaign. During his campaign Applegate raised $18,297 and spent $18,290.

Applegate received 25,068 votes in the Ohio primary where he won one county and delegate. He placed second in the 18th congressional district behind Michael Dukakis. He stated that he had succeeded in his goal in putting the issues facing the 18th congressional district before multiple presidential delegates and that he and his one delegate would lobby Dukakis at the national convention. He was later unsatisfied with Dukakis' stance and plan for acid rain and stated that he might vote for himself, as he was an unpledged delegate, with Jane Eberts, the delegate he won in Ohio, as a protest vote. Penny Federspill served as an alternate delegate for Applegate. Applegate gave his support to Dukakis after an aide told him that Dukakis would work with him on acid rain legislation. He received zero delegate votes for the presidential nomination.

Applegate was in favor of Glenn being given the vice-presidential nomination and created 10,000 bumper stickers for a Dukakis-Glenn ticket. Applegate and Marcy Kaptur worked together in support of Glenn and wrote letters to 210 Democratic members of Congress, who attended the convention as superdelegates, stating that Glenn would help Dukakis in gaining the votes of blue-collar voters who had supported Reagan in the 1984 presidential election. He was critical of Dukakis' selection of Lloyd Bentsen stating that it would hinder the campaign as "Bentsen doesn't have the national image and there's very little that he can do for the Midwest, at least as far as I can see. John Glenn can do more for the South than Bentsen can in the Midwest, and the polls showed that."

== Later life ==
During the 2006 election Applegate endorsed Zack Space for the Democratic nomination in the 18th congressional district against Ralph Applegate, who he had to state that he did not support nor was related to. Jason Wilson, who worked as a congressional intern for Applegate in 1990, was elected to the state senate in the 2006 election. He moved to Spring Hill, Florida later in his life and his wife died on June 5, 2020, before his death on August 7, 2021.

== Political positions ==
=== Crime ===
Applegate wrote a letter to Governor Michael DiSalle in 1961, asking him to halt all executions, but DiSalle stated that the "law of Ohio is such that I do not feel I could legally create a freeze on executions". He and Representative Sam Landes introduced legislation in the Ohio House of Representatives that would have made Ohio's laws against obscene movies more strict. Applegate proposed legislation while serving in the Ohio House of Representatives that would make it illegal to huff glue or nail polish to become high and instituted a $25 fine for first-time offenders and a $50 fine for further violations. Applegate proposed legislation to the state senate in 1971, that would have the state subsidize the salaries of full-time police, deputy sheriffs, and firemen at the county, municipal, or town level.

Applegate stated that "I'm against any gun control", but voted in favor of a seven-day waiting period for handgun purchases in 1988. He voted in favor of the Brady Handgun Violence Prevention Act and Federal Assault Weapons Ban and stated that "I hated to have to sway the vote" on the assault weapons ban due to the House of Representatives voting 216 to 214 on the legislation. He voted in favor of the Violent Crime Control and Law Enforcement Act.

Applegate proposed a resolution to the Ohio Senate which called for President Richard Nixon to commute William Calley's sentence. Applegate, Senator Robin Turner, and Senator Robert Secrest sponsored a resolution, which was passed by a unanimous vote in the state senate, to honor J. Edgar Hoover for his forty-seven years in law enforcement. In 1984, he voted against legislation which would have granted amnesty to illegal immigrants.

=== Economics ===
Applegate was one of fifteen Democrats who voted in favor of Governor Jim Rhodes' $1.3 billion budget in 1963. In 1973, the state senate voted nineteen to fourteen, with Applegate voting in favor, in favor of a $9.9 billion budget proposed by Governor John J. Gilligan. He was given a score of 21% by the United States Chamber of Commerce in 1982. He voted in favor of a balanced budget amendment in 1982.

In 1979, Applegate voted in favor of a ten percent budget cut for the United States Department of State which would have reduced its budget by over $200 million. Applegate opposed abolishing the United States Department of Veterans Affairs after an advisory panel appointed by President Ronald Reagan made a report suggesting that the department's responsibilities could be divided into other departments.

The House of Representatives voted 282 to 131, with Applegate in favor, in favor of the Tax Reduction and Simplification Act of 1977 although the house and Applegate voted against a permanent tax cut proposed by the Republicans. He voted in favor of legislation to give a $1.5 billion bailout to Chrysler. He opposed an 10¢ fee on gasoline proposed by Carter. He voted in favor of raising the minimum wage from $3.35 to $4.55 in 1989.

A fifty-page report listed Applegate as one of the Democratic members of the state senate controlled as a block by the Ohio AFL–CIO which was denied by Frank W. King, the head of the Ohio AFL-CIO. The House of Representatives voted 217 to 205, with Applegate in favor, against legislation to increase the power of construction workers to picket. The AFL-CIO gave him a score of 69% in 1982. He opposed the North American Free Trade Agreement.

=== Environment ===
In 1971, Applegate introduced legislation on Earth Day that would amend Ohio's Constitution to give the right to clean air, pure water, and a healthful environment to present and future generations. He requested an investigation by the Ohio Pollution Control Board into pollution in Yellow Creek after two people gave him samples of the creek showing that the water was highly acidic. He proposed legislation that would increase the power of the Ohio Air Pollution Control Board, give local governments the ability to adopt air pollution standards if they were less strict than the standards of the board, and increase the penalty for violations of the legislation.

Applegate co-sponsored legislation to reorganize Ohio's state cabinet to establish a state Department of Environmental Protection which would combine the Department of Natural Resources, Department of Health, Water Pollution Control Board, and the Air Pollution Control Board. He opposed sulphur dioxide emissions controls imposed by the United States Environmental Protection Agency on the use of Ohio coal in 1977, stating that "If adopted, this plan would cause economic disaster in the Ohio Valley." He voted in favor of reducing the EPA's budget by $133 million in 1978.

Applegate was given a score of 35% by the League of Conservation Voters in his first year in office in 1977, and his last year in 1994, with a lifetime score of 46%. His lowest score from the organization was 25% in 1988, and his highest score was 75% in 1990. The Sierra Club gave him a score of 44% in 1984.

=== Equality ===
Applegate voted in favor of an amendment to a defense appropriations bill which prohibited the usage of the money on abortions except for when the life of the mother is at risk. Noel Vaughn, the chair of the Freedom of Choice Coalition, stated that Applegate was one of Ohio's congressmen who had introduced and supported anti-abortion legislation. He voted in favor of an amendment to legislation in 1981, to prohibit the usage of federal employee medical insurance to pay for abortions unless the life of the mother was at risk. He and six other anti-abortion member of the house filed an amicus curiae in Webster v. Reproductive Health Services. In the 1980s he considered changing his anti-abortion views and voted against the Hyde Amendment in 1989.

Applegate voted against extending the deadline for the ratification of the Equal Rights Amendment in 1978. The Leadership Conference on Civil and Human Rights gave him a rating of 80% in 1984.

=== Foreign policy ===
Applegate voted in favor of legislation to remove the government of Zaire as the distributor of rice from the United States in the country and instead have the rice distributed by private relief organizations. He supported the creation of a Liaison Office with Taiwan and opposed permanent normal trade relations with China. In 1980, he voted against an amendment to move the United States' embassy in Israel from Tel Aviv to Jerusalem. He supported legislation to create a radio station to broadcast programs that opposed Fidel Castro.

The House of Representatives voted 208 to 215, with Applegate against, in favor of repealing the military aid embargo against Turkey. He voted against prohibiting the United States from manufacturing nerve gas for chemical warfare. He supported a nuclear freeze and a reduction of nuclear weapons. He voted against sending $14 million in military aid to the Contras during the Nicaraguan Revolution and stated that the money should instead be spent on humanitarian aid and later voted against giving $100 million and $48 million in military aid.

Applegate co-sponsored legislation by James Traficant which would have the United States end its protection of Kuwait's oil tankers unless Kuwait allowed the United States' minesweeping helicopters to operate from their country. He cosponsored legislation by John Kasich to end the production of the Northrop Grumman B-2 Spirit due to its cost and lack of use following the end of the Soviet Union. He called for another investigation into the turret explosion of the USS Iowa. He opposed sending American soldiers to Saudi Arabia, criticized President George H. W. Bush's plans in the Persian Gulf, and voted against the Authorization for Use of Military Force Against Iraq Resolution of 1991. Applegate voted against withdrawing American soldiers from Somalia in 1993.

Applegate voted in favor of withholding $90 million in aid to Syria after Syrian soldiers killed Lebanese Christians and later supported giving $50 million in aid to victims of the Lebanese Civil War. He voted against a resolution allowing the United States Marine Corps to stay in Lebanon for an additional eighteen months and he later supported withdrawing the United States' soldiers from Lebanon after the 1983 Beirut barracks bombings.

Applegate voted against a resolution urging for the national rugby team of South Africa to not be allowed to play in the United States due to the country's apartheid policies. He voted in favor of the Comprehensive Anti-Apartheid Act and voted to override Reagan's veto of the legislation.

Applegate voted in favor of prohibiting aid or trade to Cuba and Vietnam. Applegate, Tony P. Hall, Bob McEwen, Tom Kindness, Ralph Regula, and Mike DeWine helped present petitions by the Veterans Vigil Society requesting for the full accounting of the 2,490 Americans that were missing in action in Indochina to Speaker Tip O'Neill in 1984.

Applegate was given a score of 100% by the American Security Council Foundation in 1980, and was the only Democratic member of Congress from Ohio to receive a 100%. Applegate received score of 71% by the Nuclear Control Institute which was above the overall 47% they gave the house.

=== Flag desecration ===
In 1967, Applegate proposed legislation in the Ohio House of Representatives which would increase the penalties for the desecration of the American and Ohio flags by increasing the maximum fine from $100 to $1,000 and increasing the prison sentence from thirty days to one year. He stated that the point of the legislation was to crack down on anti-Vietnam War protesters who desecrated the flag. The legislation was passed in the state house with ninety votes in favor and no opposition. Applegate proposed legislation in 1979, which would deport any alien "who in any way desecrates or defiles the American flag".

Applegate proposed legislation to expand the definition of what abuse towards the United States flag is in response to an art piece by Dread Scott entitled What Is the Proper Way to Display a U.S. Flag in which the flag was on the floor. He supported the passage of a Flag Desecration Amendment.

Applegate stated that "I am mad as hell" and that "What in God's name is going on? This is an outrage. What will they allow next? Allow fornication in Times Square at high noon?" after the Supreme Court ruled five to four that flag desecration was protected by the First Amendment in Texas v. Johnson. He also stated that the Supreme Court had humiliated the American flag with its decision.

=== Ratings ===
Ralph Nader's Congress Watch gave Applegate a score of 40% on consumer protection, government reform, taxation, energy, and waste-subsidy in 1978. The Consumer Federation of America gave him a score of 79% in 1982, and 67% in 1984. Congressional Quarterly reported that by 1980, he had voted in favor of legislation supported by Carter thirty percent of the time and that by 1984, he had voted with Reagan twenty-seven percent of the time. In 1991, he voted with the Democrats 68%, tied with Charlie Luken, meaning that he and Luken voted the most in favor of Bush Sr. out of the Democratic house delegation from Ohio. He voted in favor of legislation supported by President Bill Clinton 66% of the time in 1993.

Applegate was given a score of 30% by the Americans for Democratic Action in his first year in office in 1977, while the American Conservative Union gave him a score of 35.14%. He received his highest score from the American Conservative Union in 1979, when they gave him 64.85% while his lowest score from the organization was 12.5% in 1992. He received his lowest score from the Americans for Democratic Action in 1991, when he was given 5%, and his highest score from the organization was 80% in 1993. He was given a rating of 40% by the American Conservative Union, with a lifetime score of 34.20%, and 50% from the Americans for Democratic Action when he left office in 1994.

Conservatives Against Liberal Legislation gave Applegate a score of 55% in 1980. He was one of the sixty-six member of the house targeted by the National Committee for an Effective Congress for the 1982 election. Congressional Quarterly stated that he voted with the conservative coalition 72% of the time by 1982. In 1982, the Committee for the Survival of a Free Congress, led by Paul Weyrich, gave him a score of 58%

Ratings
Organization	1977	1978	1979	1980	1981	1982	1983	1984	1985	1986	1987	1988	1989	1990	1991	1992	1993	1994
American Conservative Union	35.14%	43.48%	64.86%	57.89%	26.67%	45.45%	30.43%	33.33%	21.05%	22.73%	13.04%	24.00%	33.33%	33.33%	45.00%	12.50%	33.33%	40.00%
Americans for Democratic Action	30%	20%	11%	22%	35%	45%	70%	50%	55%	65%	60%	70%	70%	50%	5%	70%	80%	50%
Reference																		

=== Voting and elections ===
Applegate and Representative Anthony Calabrese Jr. introduced legislation which would have placed a ballot proposition to decrease the voting age to nineteen onto the 1966 ballot. However, the legislation failed after the Ohio House of Representatives voted seventy-one to sixty-two in favor which was twelve votes short of a three-fifths majority. He proposed legislation in 1970 and 1971, which would lower the voting age to eighteen while the minimum age for holding office would be twenty-one.

In 1969, Applegate and Senator William B. Nye co-sponsored legislation by Senator Oliver Ocasek to change the Constitution of Ohio to allow people aged nineteen to vote, but the legislation stated that nobody under the age of twenty-one could be elected or appointed to office. The Ohio Senate voted thirty to three in favor of the legislation. However, the referendum failed with 1,274,334 people voting against while 1,226,592 voted in favor. He stated that it was "paradoxical that 60 percent of the young men who are Vietnam battle casualties do not have the right to vote – a right they are fighting to defend".

Applegate supported and introduced legislation to have all presidential primaries held at the same time on the first Tuesday after the first Monday in May. He opposed the special election held to fill the Ohio's 17th congressional district following John M. Ashbrook's death stating that it was "a waste of the taxpayers' money" due to its $175,000 cost and that its sole purpose was "to get someone in who will do nothing, but vote the way the White House wants." He also criticized the special election as the 17th congressional district would not exist after 1982.

== Electoral history ==
1968 Ohio Senate 30th district Democratic primary
Party	Candidate	Votes	%
Democratic	Douglas Applegate	12,615	36.75%
Democratic	Joseph Loha	12,386	36.08%
Democratic	Danny Johnson	6,679	19.46%
Democratic	Stuart Henderson	2,648	7.71%
Total votes		34,328	100.00%

1972 Ohio Senate 30th district election
Party	Candidate	Votes	%
Democratic	Douglas Applegate (incumbent)	110,795	57.39%
Republican	Kenneth F. Berry (incumbent)	82,267	42.61%
Total votes		193,062	100.00%

1976 United States House of Representatives Ohio's 18th congressional district election
Party	Candidate	Votes	%
Democratic	Douglas Applegate	116,901	62.91%
Republican	Ralph R. McCoy	45,735	24.61%
Independent	William Crabbe	21,537	11.59%
Independent	John Dwight Bashline	1,661	0.89%
Total votes		185,834	100.00%

1978 United States House of Representatives Ohio's 18th congressional district election
Party	Candidate	Votes	%
Democratic	Douglas Applegate (incumbent)	71,894	59.50%
Republican	Bill Ress	48,931	40.50%
Total votes		120,825	100.00%

1980 United States House of Representatives Ohio's 18th congressional district election
Party	Candidate	Votes	%
Democratic	Douglas Applegate (incumbent)	134,835	76.10%
Republican	Gary L. Hammersley	42,354	23.90%
Total votes		177,189	100.00%

1982 United States House of Representatives Ohio's 18th congressional district election
Party	Candidate	Votes	%
Democratic	Douglas Applegate (incumbent)	128,665	100.00%
Total votes		128,665	100.00%

1984 United States House of Representatives Ohio's 18th congressional district election
Party	Candidate	Votes	%
Democratic	Douglas Applegate (incumbent)	155,759	75.94%
Republican	Kenneth Burt Jr.	49,356	24.06%
Total votes		205,115	100.00%

1986 United States House of Representatives Ohio's 18th congressional district election
Party	Candidate	Votes	%
Democratic	Douglas Applegate (incumbent)	126,526	100.00%
Total votes		126,526	100.00%

1988 United States House of Representatives Ohio's 18th congressional district election
Party	Candidate	Votes	%
Democratic	Douglas Applegate (incumbent)	151,306	77.62%
Republican	William C. Abraham	43,628	22.38%
Total votes		194,934	100.00%

1990 United States House of Representatives Ohio's 18th congressional district election
Party	Candidate	Votes	%
Democratic	Douglas Applegate (incumbent)	120,782	74.28%
Republican	John Hales	41,823	25.72%
Total votes		162,605	100.00%

1992 United States House of Representatives Ohio's 18th congressional district election
Party	Candidate	Votes	%
Democratic	Douglas Applegate (incumbent)	166,189	68.27%
Republican	Bill Ress	77,229	31.73%
Total votes		243,418	100.00%

U.S. House of Representatives
Preceded by Wayne Hays	Member of the U.S. House of Representatives from Ohio's 18th congressional district 1977–1995	Succeeded by Bob Ney
