= Kenneth F. Berry =

American politician

Ken Berry

Member of the Ohio Senate from the 19th district
- In office January 12, 1972-December 31, 1972
- Preceded by: James K. Leedy
- Succeeded by: Tom Van Meter

Personal details
- Born: Kenneth French Berry; October 10, 1916 Coshocton, Ohio, United States
- Died: April 26, 2003 (aged 86) Coshocton, Ohio, United States
- Party: Republican
- Education: University of Michigan

Kenneth French Berry (October 10, 1916 – April 26, 2003) was a member of the Ohio General Assembly. He served the 19th District of the Ohio Senate in 1972. He lost the primary election, and thus served less than a year after being appointed.

== Early life and military service ==
Berry attended Ohio Wesleyan University and University of Michigan Law School. Berry joined the United States Army on February 18, 1942. He was a veteran of World War II. Served over 4 years in the Armed Services including 42 months overseas. Served in Papaun, Bismarck Archipelago, New Guinea, Netherland East Indies and Philippine Campaigns. He achieved the rank of first lieutenant.
