= Antragsdelikt =

Crime needing victim complaint to prosecute

In the criminal law of some countries with a civil law system, an Antragsdelikt (plural Antragsdelikte), "no trial without a complaint", is a category of offense which cannot be prosecuted without a complaint by the victim. The same concept has been adopted in Japanese law under the name shinkokuzai (Japanese: 親告罪), in South Korean law under the name chingojoe (Korean: 친고죄), in the law of Taiwan (both during the early Republic period and post-1949 Taiwan) using various terms, in Dutch law under the name klachtdelict, in Belgian law under the name klachtmisdrijf/crime de plainte, in Finnish law under the name asianomistajarikos and in Indonesian law under the name delik aduan.

== Basic definition ==
The term comes from the German language words Antrag (petition) and Delikt (offense, from Latin "dēlictum").

Antragsdelikt is somewhat analogous to the concept of a compoundable offense in Thai law, though different from that synonymous term in Malaysian law or Singaporean law.

== Germany ==
In contrast to Offizialdelikte, major crimes are those which the prosecutors will investigate and bring charges with or without a victim's complaint; Antragsdelikte are minor criminal offences that will only be prosecuted under German law if the victim files a "Strafantrag" ("application" or "criminal complaint" or "request to prosecute") within a certain deadline.

The German Criminal Code (Strafgesetzbuch) lists the following as offenses which will only be prosecuted on request:

- Unlawful entry (§ 123)
- Violation of instructions during supervision of conduct (§ 145a)
- Defamation (§ 185, in conjunction with § 194)
- Violation of privacy and personal secrets (203 and 204, in conjunction with § 205)
- Domestic theft (§ 247)
- Taking without owner's consent (§ 248b)
- Energy theft (§ 248c)
- Unlawfully offering an advantage (§ 257)
- Thwarting of distraint (§ 288)
- Unlawful retaking of pawned goods (§ 289)
- Poaching of fish (§ 293, in conjunction with § 294)
- Acts committed under intoxication where the intoxication causes diminished responsibility (§ 323a)
- Breach of fiscal secrecy (§ 355)

In addition, the German Criminal Code states that the following offences will be prosecuted on the request of the victim or in the case of "special public interest":

- Statutory rape, if the victim is between 14 and 16 years old and the offender older than 21 (§ 182 para. 3)
- Exhibitionism (§ 183)
- Violation of privacy and personal secrets (§§ 202 a and 202 b, in conjunction with § 205)
- Battery (§ 223, in conjunction with § 230)
- Negligent battery (§ 229, in conjunction with § 230)
- Child abduction (§ 235)
- Stalking (§ 238 para. 1)
- Theft and embezzlement of low-value items (§ 248a)
- Corruption and bribery in business transactions (§ 299, in conjunction with § 301)
- Property damage (§ 303, in conjunction with § 303c)
- Unlawful alteration of data (§ 303a, in conjunction with § 303c)
- Computer sabotage (§ 303b, in conjunction with § 303c)

German law also has a converse category of crimes which require prosecution in any case, no matter if there is a complainant or not. These offenses, or "ex officio crimes", are called "Offizialdelikte" in German (Delikte is the plural).

== Japan ==
The concept of shinkokuzai first entered into Japanese law in the early Meiji period. The 1870 criminal code Shinritsu Kōryō (新律綱領), though it did not use the term directly, stated that the prosecution of a number of violent offenses between husband and wife depended on a complaint by the person in question. The phrase used to express this condition, mizukara tsugeru wo mate, is probably the origin of the modern term shinkokuzai; mizukara tsugeru (to inform personally) contains two of the same kanji used to write shinkokuzai. The draft criminal code of November 1877 used the term shinkokuzai directly in the definitions of various offenses. Under modern Japanese law, before July 13, 2017, sexual offenses such as rape or indecent assault were categorized as shinkokuzai, lest a prosecution against the victim's will result in secondary victimization or infringement of privacy.

== South Korea ==
In South Korea, the following offenses are categorized as chingojoe:

- Criminal adultery
- Defamation against a dead person, and
- Contempt of court

== Republic of China ==
=== Before 1949 ===
The term qīngàozuì (Chinese: 親告罪) was used in laws in China's early Republic era (1912–1928), for example in the 1921 Criminal Procedure Ordinance or the 1928 Criminal Procedure Law. However, in modern terminology, the concept of a crime for which there will be no trial without complaint is usually expressed as gàosunǎilùn zhī zuì (Chinese: 告訴乃論之罪).

=== Taiwan ===
The Criminal Code of Taiwan, inherited from the Republic of China, uses the term Chinese: 告訴乃論; pinyin: gàosù nǎi lùn (lit. "action only if complained"). There are currently five offenses in this category, all of which are minor offenses against individuals: insult, defamation, infringement of freedom of marriage (usually by parents), maltreat (of family members) and ordinary embezzlement. However, the Criminal Code does state that any such offense resulting in serious consequences (e.g. serious injury or death) is prosecutable without complaint.

A 1999 amendment to Taiwan's Criminal Code removed indecent assault and rape (Article 239; with the exception of spousal rape) from this category, In 2003, another amendment removed cybercrime from this category and penalties were increased, likely as a response to the CIH computer virus incident where prosecutors were unable to charge the perpetrators involved because no victims came forward with a lawsuit.

== Egypt ==
While no formal class of law equivalent to the Antragsdelikt exists in the law of Egypt, several religious crimes, including apostasy, cannot be prosecuted on the initiative of the public prosecutor; the case must instead be raised by another citizen.
