= Kinsey Milleson =

American politician (1934–2017)

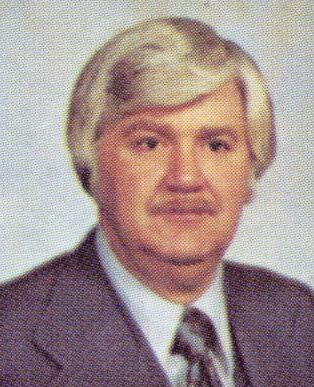

Member of the Ohio Senate from the 30th district
- In office January 3, 1975 – December 31, 1980
- Preceded by: Douglas Applegate
- Succeeded by: Bill Ress

Personal details
- Born: August 11, 1934 Freeport, Ohio, U.S.
- Died: January 19, 2017 (aged 82) New Philadelphia, Ohio, U.S.
- Party: Democratic
- Occupation: Real Estate

Ronald Kinsey Milleson (August 11, 1934 – January 19, 2017) was an American politician who served as a Democratic member of the Ohio Senate, representing the 30th district from 1975 to 1980. He was preceded by Douglas Applegate. His son, Richard Milleson, is a Regional Director for the Ohio Department of Natural Resources.

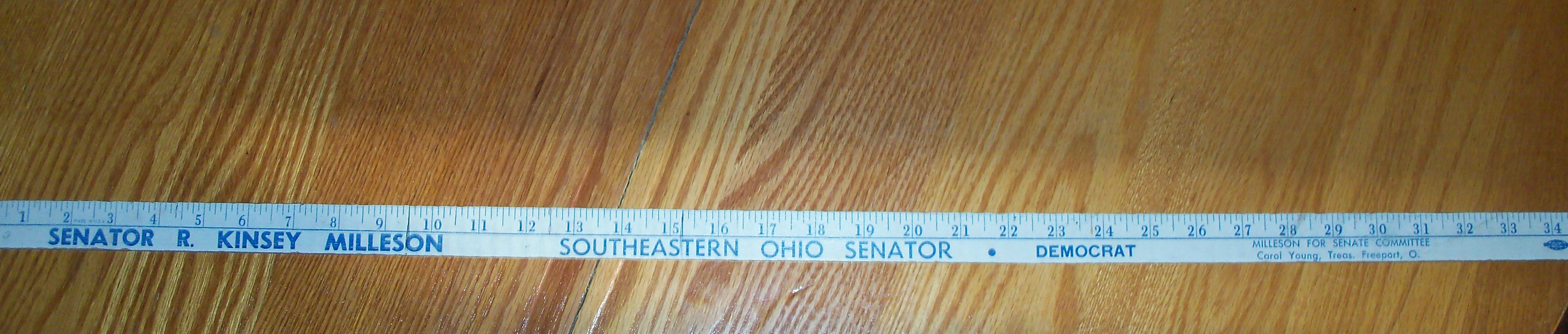
A campaign freebie for Milleson
