= James K. Leedy =

American politician

Jim Leedy

Member of the Ohio Senate from the 19th district
- In office January 3, 1967 – December 31, 1971
- Preceded by: Districts Created
- Succeeded by: Kenneth F. Berry

Personal details
- Born: October 3, 1924 Shreve, Ohio, United States
- Died: September 5, 1983 (aged 57) Wooster, Ohio, United States
- Party: Republican

James Kaylor "Jim" Leedy (October 3, 1925 – September 5, 1983) was a member of the Ohio Senate, serving from the 19th District from 1967-. His district encompassed much of North-Central Ohio.
