= National Guard (United States) =

Organized militia of the United States and a reserve component of the Armed Forces

- Seal
- Founded: Organized militia: December 13, 1636 (Massachusetts Bay); National Guard: July 15, 1825 (New York); January 21, 1903 (nationwide); Dual state militia / U.S. reserve: June 15, 1933
- Country: United States
- Allegiance: Federal (10 U.S.C. § E); State and territorial (32 U.S.C.)
- Branch: U.S. Army; U.S. Air Force
- Type: Militia; U.S. Armed Forces Reserve
- Size: 430,040 (Authorized FY 23)
- Part of: U.S. Armed Forces
- Garrison/HQ: All 50 U.S. states, and organized U.S. territories, the Commonwealth of Puerto Rico, and the District of Columbia
- Nickname: "The Guard"
- Mottos: "Always Ready, Always There!"
- March: Always Ready, Always There
- Website: nationalguard.mil

Commanders
- Commander-in-Chief: President Donald Trump
- Chief: Gen Steven S. Nordhaus, USAF
- Vice Chief: GEN Thomas Carden, USA
- Senior Enlisted Advisor: SEANGB John T. Raines III, USA

Insignia
- Seal of the Army National Guard

- Emblem of the Air National Guard

The National Guard (NG) is the organized militia of the United States and a reserve component of the United States Armed Forces.

The National Guard is composed of reserve components of the United States Air Force and the United States Army: the Air National Guard and the Army National Guard, respectively. It is based in each of the 50 U.S. states, the District of Columbia, and three U.S. territories. (Note: Guam, Puerto Rico, and the U.S. Virgin Islands.) Guard components are part of the U.S. Army and the U.S. Air Force when activated for federal missions.

The legal basis of the National Guard is Congress's Article I, Section 8 enumerated power to "raise and support Armies". All members of the National Guard are also members of the Militia of the United States as defined by 10 U.S.C. § 246. National Guard units are under the dual control of U.S. state or territorial governments and the U.S. federal government. The National Guard can be called upon to act by state government in domestic security emergencies (such as civil unrest) or natural disasters (like hurricanes, floods, and earthquakes), and by the federal government to reinforce the Army or Air Force.

Most National Guard soldiers and airmen serve part-time while holding a full-time civilian job. These part-time guardsmen are augmented by a full-time cadre of Active Guard and Reserve (AGR) personnel in both the Army National Guard and Air National Guard, plus Army Reserve Technicians in the Army National Guard and Air Reserve Technicians (ART) in the Air National Guard. Service was previously represented by the recruitment slogan "One weekend a month, two weeks a year", which was dropped after 2004 as many National Guard soldiers were deployed to active service at the Iraq War.

Colonial militia units were formed during the English colonization of North America from the 17th century onward. The first colony-wide militia was formed by Massachusetts in 1636 by merging small, older local units, and several National Guard units can be traced back to this militia. The various colonial militias became state militias when the United States became independent. The title "National Guard" was used in 1824 by some New York State militia units, named after the French National Guard in honor of the Marquis de Lafayette. "National Guard" became a standard nationwide militia title in 1903, and has specifically indicated reserve forces under mixed state and federal control since 1933. In the 21st century, state-level Defend the Guard legislation has been proposed that would require a formal congressional declaration of war before National Guard units can be deployed in overseas combat.

== Origins ==
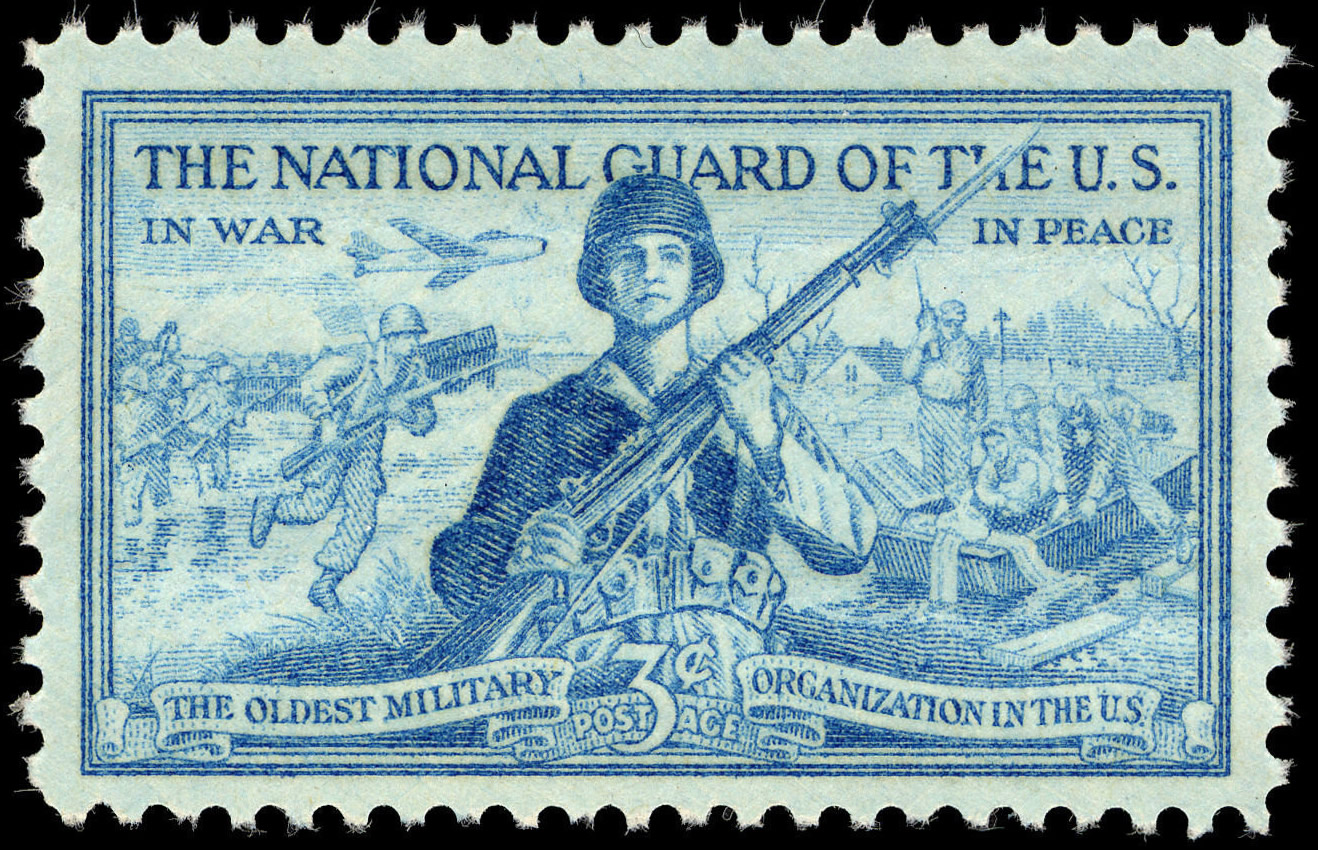
1953 postage stamp

On December 13, 1636, the first militia regiments in North America were organized in Massachusetts. Based upon an order of the Massachusetts Bay Colony's General Court, the colony's militia was organized into three permanent regiments to better defend the colony. Today, the descendants of these first regiments – the 181st Infantry, the 182nd Infantry, the 101st Field Artillery, and the 101st Engineer Battalion of the Massachusetts Army National Guard – share the distinction of being the oldest units in the U.S. military. December 13, 1636, thus marks the beginning of the organized militia, and the birth of the National Guard's oldest organized units is symbolic of the founding of all the state, territory, and District of Columbia militias that collectively make up today's National Guard.

Previous to this, unregulated militias were mustered sporadically in Spanish and English colonies. On September 16, 1565, in the newly established Spanish town of St. Augustine, militia were assigned to guard the expedition's supplies while their leader, Pedro Menéndez de Avilés, took the regular troops north to attack the French settlement at Fort Caroline on the St. Johns River. This Spanish militia tradition and the tradition that was established in England's North American colonies provided the basic nucleus for Colonial defense in the New World.

The militia tradition continued with the New World's first permanent English settlements. Jamestown Colony (established in 1607) and Plymouth Colony (established in 1620) both had militia forces, which initially consisted of every able-bodied adult male. By the mid-1600s every town had at least one militia company (usually commanded by an officer with the rank of captain), and the militia companies of a county formed a regiment (usually commanded by an officer with the rank of major in the 1600s or a colonel in the 1700s). The first federal laws regulating the militia were the Militia acts of 1792.

From the nation's founding through the early 1900s, the United States maintained only a minimal army and relied on state militias, directly related to the earlier Colonial militias to supply the majority of its troops. As a result of the Spanish–American War, Congress was called upon to reform and regulate state militias' training and qualification.

U.S. Senator Charles W. F. Dick, a Major General in the Ohio National Guard and the chair of the Committee on the Militia, sponsored the 1903 Dick Act towards the end of the 57th U.S. Congress. Under this legislation, passed January 21, 1903, the organized militia of the states were given federal funding and required to conform to Regular Army organization within five years. The act also required National Guard units to attend twenty four drills and five days annual training a year, and, for the first time, provided for pay for annual training. In return for the increased federal funding which the act made available, militia units were subject to inspection by Regular Army officers, and had to meet certain standards.

It required the states to divide their militias into two sections. The law recommended the title "National Guard" for the first section, known as the organized militia, and "Reserve Militia" for all others.

During World War I, Congress passed the National Defense Act of 1916, which required the use of the term "National Guard" for the state militias and further regulated them. Congress also authorized the states to maintain Home Guards, which were state-controlled reserve forces outside the National Guard.

In 1933, with the passage of the National Guard Mobilization Act, Congress finalized the split between the National Guard and the traditional state militias by mandating that all federally funded soldiers take a dual enlistment/commission and thus enter both their state's National Guard and the "National Guard of the United States," a newly-created federal reserve force considered part of the Army at all times.

The National Defense Act of 1947 created the Air Force as a separate branch of the United States armed forces and concurrently created the Air National Guard as one of its reserve components, mirroring the Army's structure.

== Organization ==
=== Territorial organization ===
The National Guard of the several states, territories, and the District of Columbia serves as part of the first line of defense for the United States. The state National Guard is organized into units stationed in each of the 50 states, three territories, and the District of Columbia, and operates under their respective state or territorial governor, except in the instance of Washington, D.C., where the National Guard operates under the president of the United States or their designee. The governors exercise control through the state adjutants general. Governors may call up the National Guard for active duty to help respond to domestic emergencies and disasters, such as hurricanes, floods, and earthquakes.

=== National Guard Bureau ===
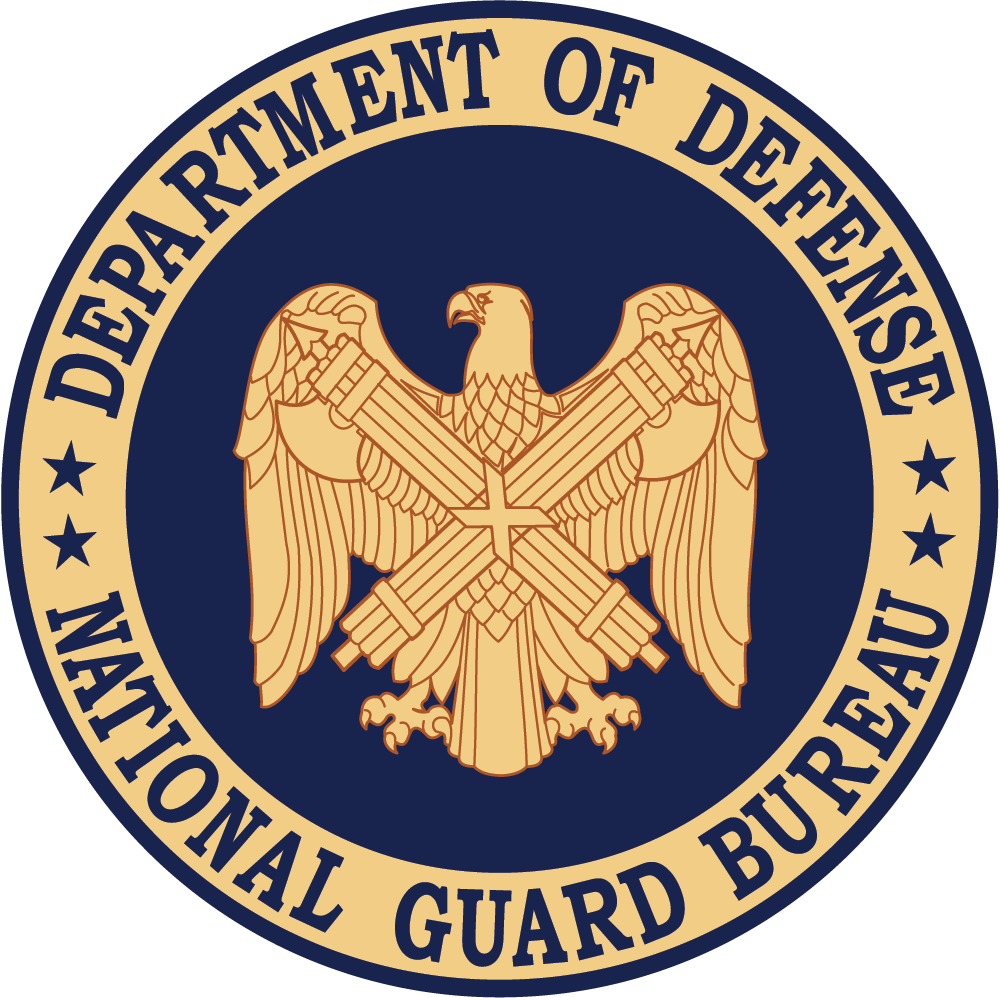
Seal of the National Guard Bureau, 2013 to present

The National Guard is administered by the National Guard Bureau, a joint activity of the Army and Air Force under the Department of Defense. The National Guard Bureau provides a communication channel for state National Guards to the DoD. The National Guard Bureau also provides policies and requirements for training and funds for state Army National Guard and state Air National Guard units, the allocation of federal funds to the Army National Guard and the Air National Guard, and other administrative responsibilities prescribed under 10 U.S.C. § 10503. The National Guard Bureau is headed by the Chief of the National Guard Bureau (CNGB), who is a four-star general in the Army or Air Force and is a member of the Joint Chiefs of Staff.

The National Guard Bureau is headquartered in Arlington County, Virginia, and is a joint activity of the Department of Defense to conduct all the administrative matters pertaining to the Army National Guard and the Air National Guard. The chief is either an Army or an Air Force four-star general officer, and is the senior uniformed National Guard officer, and is a member of the Joint Chiefs of Staff. In this capacity, he serves as a military adviser to the president, the secretary of defense, the National Security Council and is the Department of Defense's official channel of communication to the governors and to State Adjutants General on all matters pertaining to the National Guard. He is responsible for ensuring that the more than half a million Army and Air National Guard personnel are accessible, capable, and ready to protect the homeland and to provide combat resources to the Army and the Air Force. He is appointed by the president in his capacity as Commander in Chief.

=== Constitutional basis ===
The respective state National Guards are authorized by the Constitution of the United States. As originally drafted, the Constitution recognized the existing state militias, and gave them vital roles to fill: "to execute the Laws of the Union, suppress Insurrections and repel Invasion." (Article I, Section 8, Clause 15). The Constitution distinguished "militias," which were state entities, from "Troops," which were unlawful for states to maintain without Congressional approval. (Article I, Section 10, Clause 3). Under current law, the respective state National Guards and the State Defense Forces are authorized by Congress to the states and are referred to as "troops." 32 U.S.C. § 109.

Although originally state entities, the Constitutional "Militia of the Several States" were not entirely independent because they could be federalized. According to Article I, Section 8; Clause 15, the United States Congress is given the power to pass laws for "calling forth the Militia to execute the Laws of the Union, suppress Insurrections and repel Invasions." Congress is also empowered to come up with the guidelines "for organizing, arming, and disciplining, the Militia, and for governing such Part of them as may be employed in the Service of the United States, reserving to the States respectively, the Appointment of the Officers, and the Authority of training the Militia according to the discipline prescribed by Congress" (clause 16). The president of the United States is the commander-in-chief of the state militias "when called into the actual Service of the United States." (Article II, Section 2).

The traditional state militias were redefined and recreated as the "organized militia"—the National Guard, via the Militia Act of 1903. They were now subject to an increasing amount of federal control, including having arms and accoutrements supplied by the central government, federal funding, and numerous closer ties to the Regular Army.

=== Proposed Space National Guard ===
Proposals for the establishment of a National Guard component for the United States Space Force has existed for years, even as early as 2018.

A report by the Congressional Budget Office indicated that the creation of a Space National Guard, as proposed by the National Guard Bureau, would cost an additional $100 million per year in operations and support costs, with a onetime cost of $20 million in the construction of new facilities. This report directly contradicted the statement by the National Guard Bureau that a Space National Guard would only have a onetime cost at creation, and then be cost-neutral.

The report also analyzed the cost of the creation of a larger Space National Guard, which would be ~33% of the Space Force, calculating that the annual operating cost would be $385 million to $490 million per year.

However, several states already have existing National Guard space operations, including Alaska, California, Colorado, Florida, New York, Arkansas, and Ohio; there is also a space component in the Guam Air National Guard.

== Standards ==
Both the Army National Guard and Air National Guard are expected to adhere to the same moral and physical standards as their "full-time" active duty and "part-time" reserve federal counterparts. The same ranks and insignia of the U.S. Army and U.S. Air Force are used by the Army National Guard and the Air National Guard, respectively, and National Guard members are eligible to receive all United States military awards. The respective state National Guards also bestow state awards for services rendered both at home and abroad. Under Army and Air Force regulations, these awards may be worn while in state, but not federal, duty status. Regular Army and Army Reserve soldiers are also authorized to accept these awards, but are not authorized to wear them.

Army National Guard recruits arriving at Fort Jackson for basic training

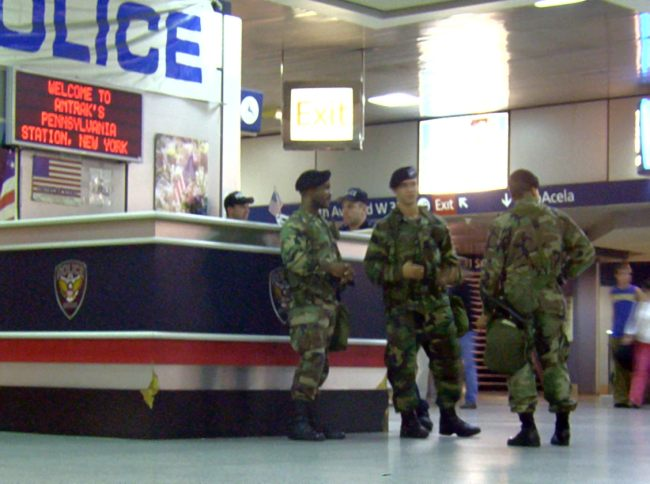
Army National Guard soldiers at New York City's Penn Station in 2004

== Other organizations ==
=== State defense forces ===
Many states also maintain their own state defense forces. Although not federal entities like the National Guard, these forces are components of the state militias like the individual state National Guards.

These forces were created by Congress in 1917 as a result of the state National Guards' being deployed and were known as Home Guards. In 1940, with the onset of World War II and as a result of its federalizing the National Guard, Congress amended the National Defense Act of 1916, and authorized the states to maintain "military forces other than National Guard." This law authorized the War Department to train and arm the new military forces that became known as State Guards. In 1950, with the outbreak of the Korean War and at the urging of the National Guard, Congress reauthorized the separate state military forces for a time period of two years. These state military forces were authorized military training at federal expense, and "arms, ammunition, clothing, and equipment," as deemed necessary by the Secretary of the Army. In 1956, Congress finally revised the law and authorized "State defense forces" permanently under Title 32, Section 109, of the United States Code.

=== Naval militias ===
Although there are no Naval or Marine Corps components of the National Guard, there is a Naval Militia authorized under federal law, 10 U.S.C. § 8901. Like the soldiers and airmen in the National Guard, members of the Naval Militia are authorized federal appointments or enlistments at the discretion of the Secretary of the Navy.10 U.S.C. § 7852. To receive federal funding and equipment, a state naval militia must be composed of at least 95% of Navy, Coast Guard, or Marine Corps Reservists. As such, some states maintain such units. Some states also maintain naval components of their State Defense Force. Recently, Alaska, California, New Jersey, New York, South Carolina, Texas and Ohio have had or currently maintain naval militias. Other states have laws authorizing them but do not currently have them organized. To receive federal funding, as is the case in the National Guard, a state must meet specific requirements such as having a set percentage of its members in the federal reserves.10 U.S.C. § 7851.

== Duties and administrative organization ==
National Guard units can be mobilized for federal active duty to supplement the Armed Forces during times of war or national emergency declared by Congress, the president or the secretary of defense. They can also be activated for service in their respective states upon declaration of a state of emergency by the governor of the state or territory where they serve, or in the case of Washington, D.C., by the Commanding General. Unlike U.S. Army Reserve members, National Guard members cannot be mobilized individually, except through voluntary transfers and Temporary Duty Assignments (TDY). The types of activation are as follows:

| | State active duty | Title 32 | Title 10 |
| Command and control (C2) | Governor | Governor | President |
| Military C2 | Adjutant general | Adjutant general | Combatant commander |
| Duty assignments | In accordance with state law | U.S. | Worldwide |
| Pay | State | Federal | Federal |
| Domestic law enforcement powers | Yes | Yes | No (Note: Unless the Insurrection Act is invoked.) |
| Missions examples | Civil support; law enforcement; others as determined by governor | Training; civil support; law enforcement; counter drug; WMD response; | Overseas training; expeditionary missions; civil support and law enforcement (Note: Title 10 is rarely used for domestic operations.) |
| Activation examples | Oklahoma City bombing; Kansas tornadoes; California wildfires; various hurricanes | Border security; post-9/11 airport security; SLC Olympics; Hurricane Katrina | Bosnia; Afghanistan; Cuba; Iraq; 1992 Los Angeles riots (Note: The Insurrection Act was invoked.) |

== National Guard active duty character ==
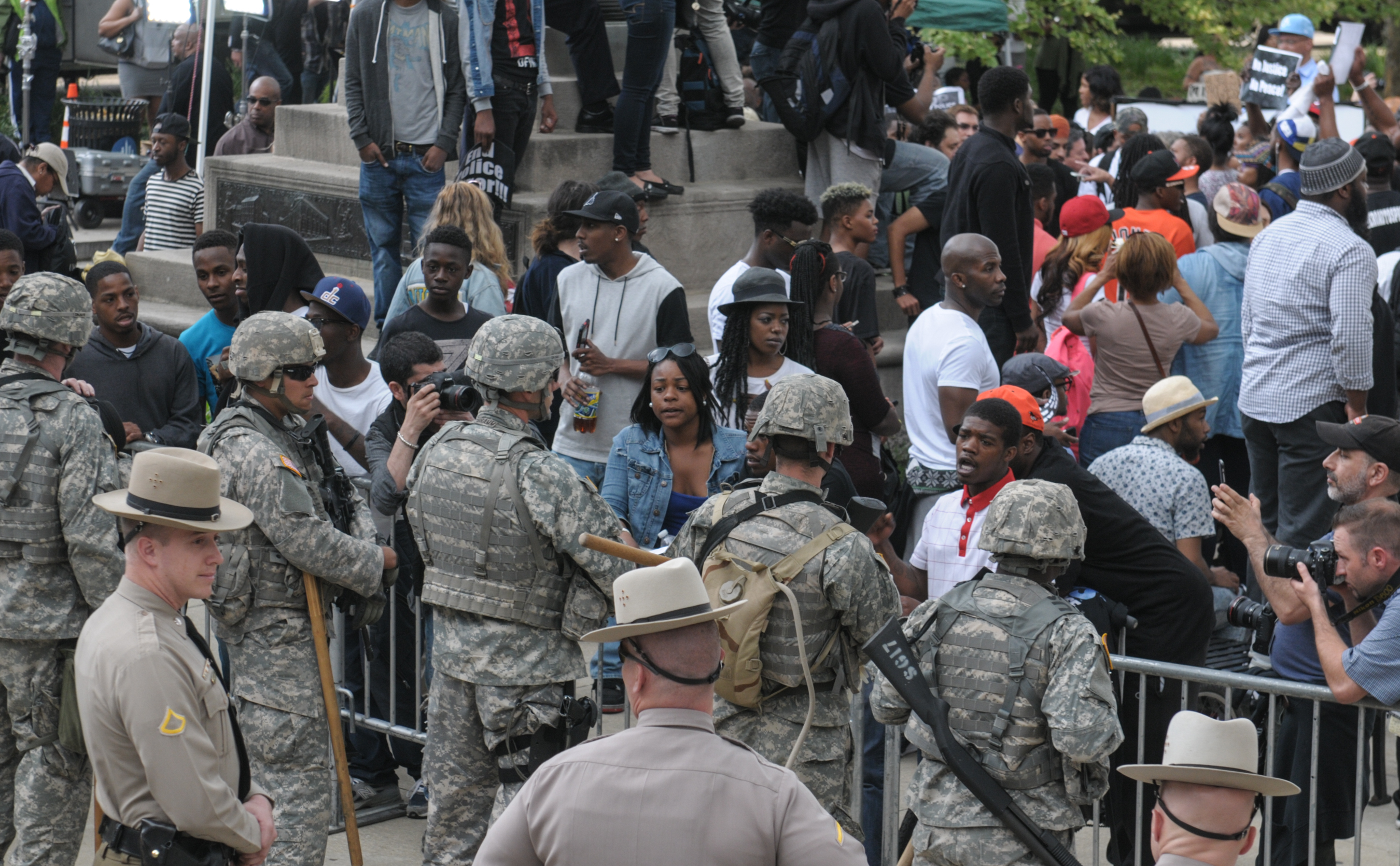
Maryland Army National Guard Soldiers reinforcing local law enforcement in protests in front of the Baltimore City Hall, 2015.

The term "activated" simply means that a unit or individual of the reserve components has been placed on orders. The purpose and authority for that activation determine limitations and duration of the activation. The Army and Air National Guard may be activated in a number of ways as prescribed by public law. Broadly, under federal law, there are two titles in the United States Code under which units and troops may be activated: as federal soldiers or airmen under Title 10 ("Armed Forces") and as state soldiers or airmen performing a federally-funded mission under Title 32 ("National Guard"). Outside federal activation, the Army and Air National Guard may be activated under state law. This is known as state active duty (SAD).

=== State and territory duty ===
When National Guard units are not under federal control, the governor is the commander-in-chief of the units of his or her respective state or territory (such as Puerto Rico, Guam and the Virgin Islands). The president of the United States commands the District of Columbia National Guard, though this command is routinely delegated to the Commanding General of the DC National Guard. States are free to employ their National Guard forces under state control for state purposes and at state expense as provided in the state's constitution and statutes. In doing so, governors, as commanders-in-chief, can directly access and utilize the Guard's federally assigned aircraft, vehicles and other equipment so long as the federal government is reimbursed for the use of fungible equipment and supplies such as fuel, food stocks, etc. This is the authority under which governors activate and deploy National Guard forces in response to natural disasters. It is also the authority under which governors deploy National Guard forces in response to human-made emergencies such as riots and civil unrest, or terrorist attacks.

- The governor can activate National Guard personnel to "State Active Duty" in response to natural or human-made disasters or Homeland Defense missions. State Active Duty is based on State statute and policy and on State funds. Soldiers and Airmen remain under the command and control of the governor. The federal Posse Comitatus Act (PCA) does not apply under state active duty status or Title 32 status.
- Title 32 Full-Time National Guard Duty. (Federally funded, but command and control remains with the state governor through his Adjutant General.) Title 32 activation can only be done by the president or SECDEF with the approval and consent of the state governor.

=== Federal duty ===
Title 10 service means full-time duty in the active military service of the United States. The term used is federalized. Federalized National Guard forces have been ordered by the president to active duty either in their reserve component status or by calling them into Federal service in their militia status. There are several forms:

- Voluntary Order to Active Duty.

Federalized with the soldier's or airman's consent and the consent of their governor.

- Partial Mobilization.

In time of national emergency declared by the president for any unit or any member for not more than 24 consecutive months.

- Presidential Reserve Call Up.

When the president determines that it is necessary to augment the active forces for any operational mission for any unit or any member for not more than 270 days.

- Federal Aid for State Governments.

Whenever an insurrection occurs in any state against its government, the president may, upon the request of its legislature or of its governor call into Federal service such of the militia of the other states. This is a statutory exception to the PCA.

- Use of Militia and Armed Forces to Enforce Federal Authority.

Whenever the president considers that unlawful obstructions, assemblages, or rebellion make it impracticable to enforce the laws of the United States in any state or territory, he may call into Federal service such of the militia of any state. This is another statutory exception to the PCA.

- Interference with State and Federal law.

The president, by using the militia or the armed forces, or both, or by any other means, shall take such measures as he considers necessary to suppress, in a state, any insurrection, domestic violence, unlawful combination, or conspiracy.

- Air and Army National Guard.

Air and Army National Guard can specifically be called into Federal service in case of invasion, rebellion, or inability to execute Federal law with active forces.

In the categories listed above, Army and Air National Guard units or individuals may also be mobilized for non-combat purposes such as the State Partnership Program, humanitarian missions, counter-drug operations, and peacekeeping or peace enforcement missions. An example of a National Guard being federalized was the Stand in the Schoolhouse Door in 1963 where the Alabama National Guard was federalized in order to allow black students to enroll at the University of Alabama.

== History ==
=== Colonial history ===
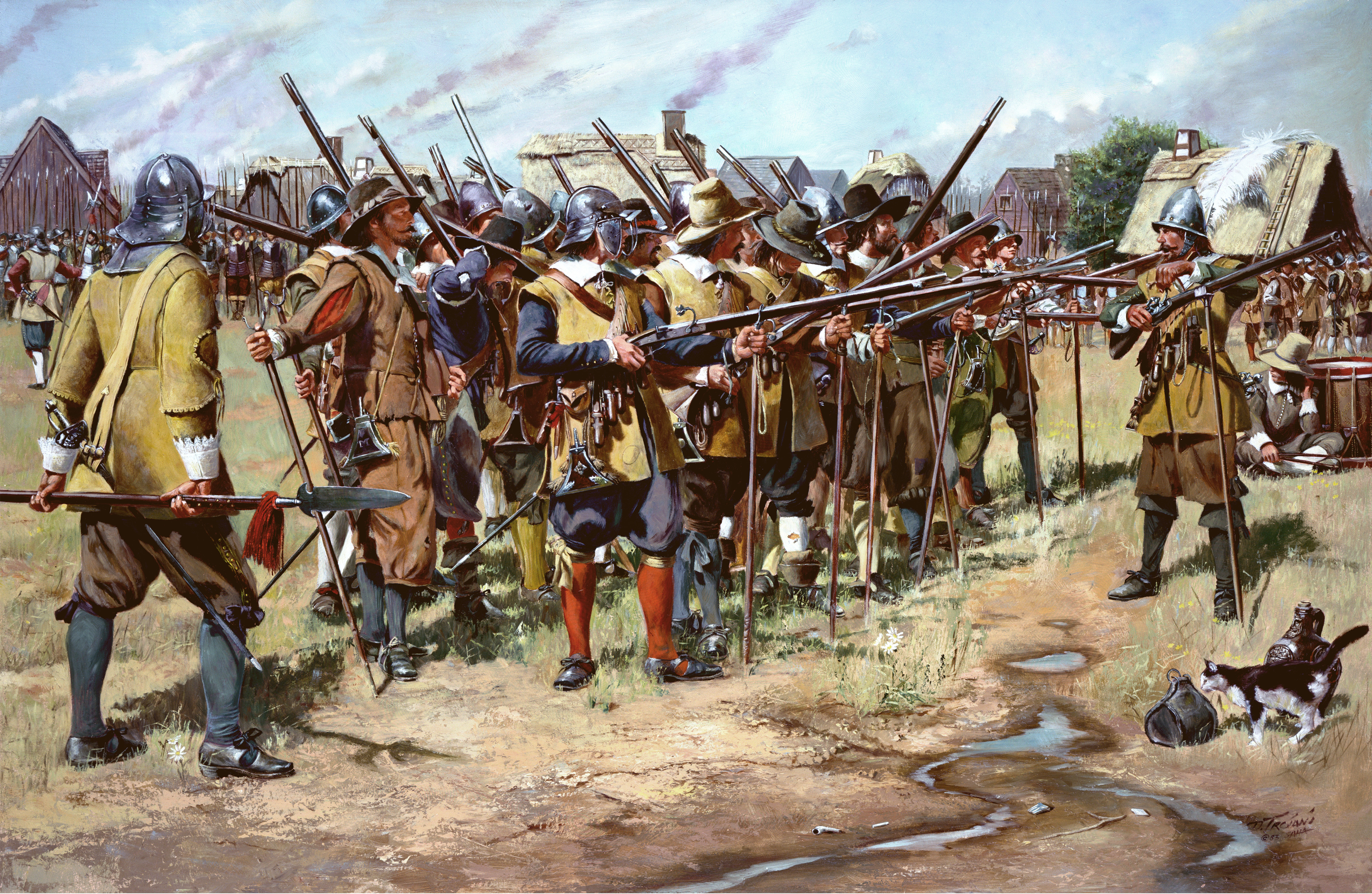
First muster of the East Regiment (present-day Massachusetts Army National Guard) in Salem, Massachusetts Bay Colony, Spring 1637, as imagined by artist Don Troiani in the 1980s

On December 13, 1636, the General Court of the Massachusetts Bay Colony ordered that the Colony's scattered militia companies be organized into North, South and East Regiments—with the goal of increasing accountability to the colonial government and responsiveness during conflicts with indigenous Pequot Indians. Under this act, white males between the ages of 16 and 60 were obligated to possess arms and to take part in the defense of their communities by serving in nightly guard details and participating in weekly drills. The modern-day 101st Field Artillery Regiment, 182nd Infantry Regiment, 101st Engineer Battalion and 181st Infantry Regiment of the Massachusetts Army National Guard are directly descended from the original colonial regiments formed in 1636.

=== American Revolutionary War ===
The Massachusetts militia began the American Revolutionary War at the Battles of Lexington and Concord, The Massachusetts militia units were mobilized either during or shortly after the above battles and used to form, along with units from Rhode Island, Connecticut and New Hampshire, the Army of Observation during the Siege of Boston. On July 3, 1775, General George Washington, under the authority of the Continental Congress, assumed command of the Army of Observation and the new organization became the Continental Army from which the United States Army traces its origins.

Throughout the war, militia units were mobilized when British forces entered their geographic areas and participated in most of the battles fought during the war.

=== Nineteenth century ===
The early United States distrusted a standing army – in emulation of a long-standing British distrust – and kept the number of professional soldiers small. During the Northwest Indian War, the majority of soldiers were provided by state militias. There are nineteen Army National Guard units with campaign credit for the War of 1812.

The Marquis de Lafayette visited the U.S. in 1824–25. The 2nd Battalion, 11th New York Artillery, was one of many militia commands who turned out in welcome. This unit decided to adopt the title "National Guard," in honor of Lafayette's French National Guard. The Battalion, later the 7th Regiment, was prominent in the line of march on the occasion of Lafayette's final passage through New York en route home to France. Taking note of the troops named for his old command, Lafayette alighted from his carriage, walked down the line, clasping each officer by the hand as he passed.

Militia units provided 70% of the soldiers that fought in the Mexican–American War, and also provided the majority of soldiers in the early months of the American Civil War The majority of soldiers in the Spanish–American War were from the National Guard.

=== Industrialization and labor unrest ===
Labor unrest in the industrial and mining sections of the Northeast and Midwest led to demands for a stronger military force within the states.

On July 14, 1877, workers on the Baltimore and Ohio Railroad (B&O) began to stop trains in Martinsburg, West Virginia in response to wage cuts. This protest developed into the national Great Railroad Strike of 1877. West Virginia governor Henry M. Mathews was the first state commander-in-chief to send in troops to break-up the protests, and this action has been viewed in retrospect as an incident that would transform the National Guard.

After the Great Railroad Strike of 1877, calls for military suppression of labor strikes grew louder, and National Guard units proliferated. In many states, large and elaborate armories, often built to resemble medieval castles, were constructed to house militia units. Businessmen and business associations donated monies for the construction of armories and to supplement funds of the local National Guard units. National Guard officers also came from the middle and upper classes. National Guard troops were deployed to suppress strikers in some of the bloodiest and most significant conflicts of the late 19th and early 20th centuries, including the Homestead Strike, the Pullman Strike of 1894, and the Colorado Labor Wars.

=== Twentieth century ===
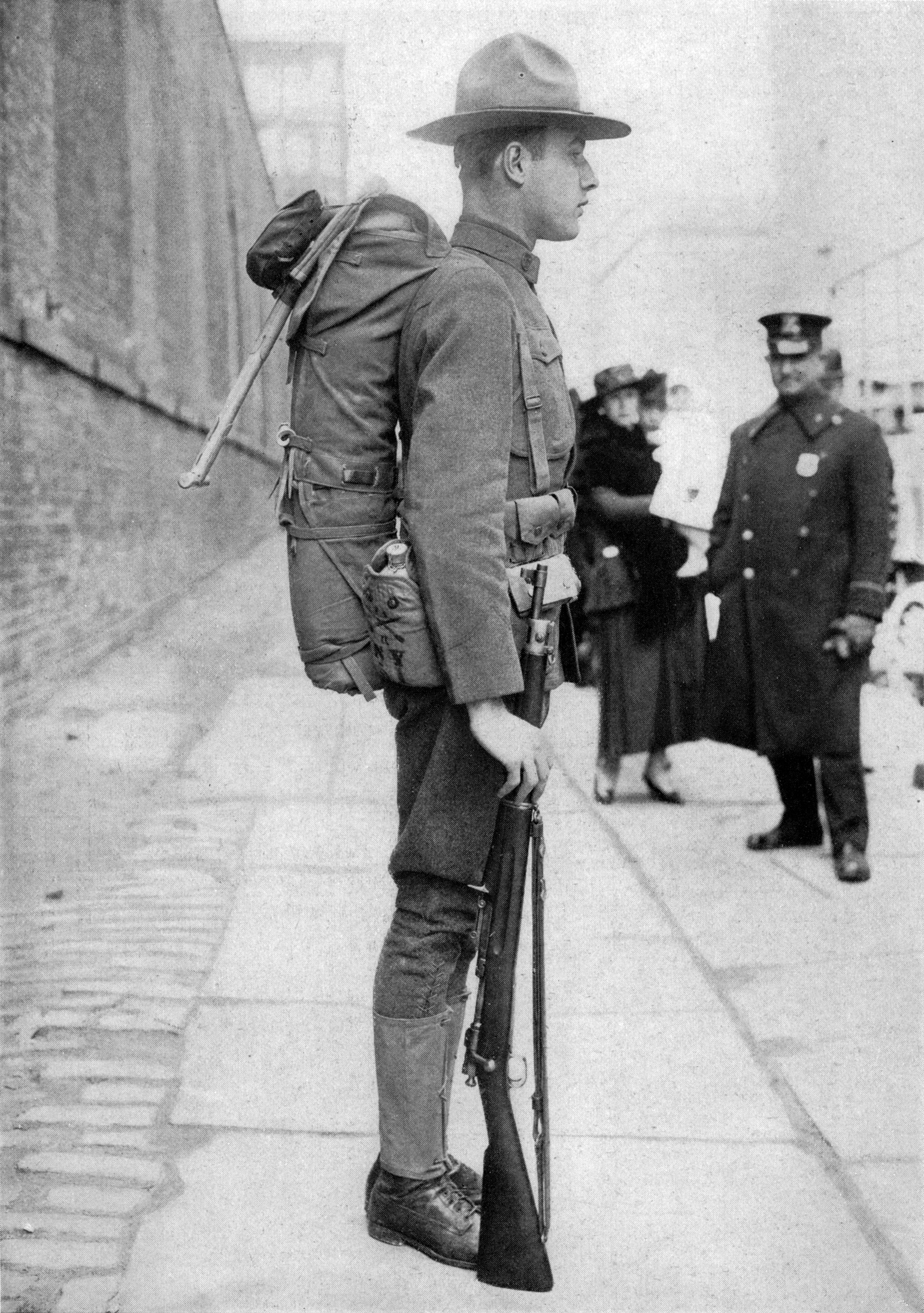
A National Guardsman in 1917

Throughout the 19th century the Regular U.S. Army was small, and the state militias provided the majority of the troops during the Mexican–American War, the American Civil War, and the Spanish–American War. With the Militia Act of 1903, the militia was more organized and the name "National Guard" recommended. In 1908, the prohibition on National Guard units serving overseas was dropped. This resulted in constitutional debates within the U.S. government surrounding the legality of the use of the National Guard overseas, culminating in 1912 when U.S. Attorney General George W. Wickersham declared the 1908 amendment to be unconstitutional. The National Defense Act of 1916 contained a provision whereby the president could discharge National Guard members from the militia and draft them into the Army in the event of a war, allowing for their use overseas. This resulted in former National Guard members being discharged from the Army entirely (also losing their status as state troops) when they left service, so the 1920 amendments to the act defined the National Guard's dual role as a state and federal reserve force; the "National Guard while in the service of the United States" as a component of the Army of the United States could be ordered to active duty by the president, be deployed overseas if they so wished, and the Guardsmen would then revert to their status as state troops. The dual state and federal status proved confusing, so in 1933, the National Defense Act of 1916 was amended again. It finally severed the National Guard's traditional connection with the militia clause of the Constitution, providing for a new component called the "National Guard of the United States" that was to be a reserve component of the Army of the United States at all times. This is the beginning of the present legal basis of the National Guard. In World War I, National Guard soldiers made up 40 percent of the men in U.S. combat divisions in France. In World War II, the National Guard made up 18 divisions.

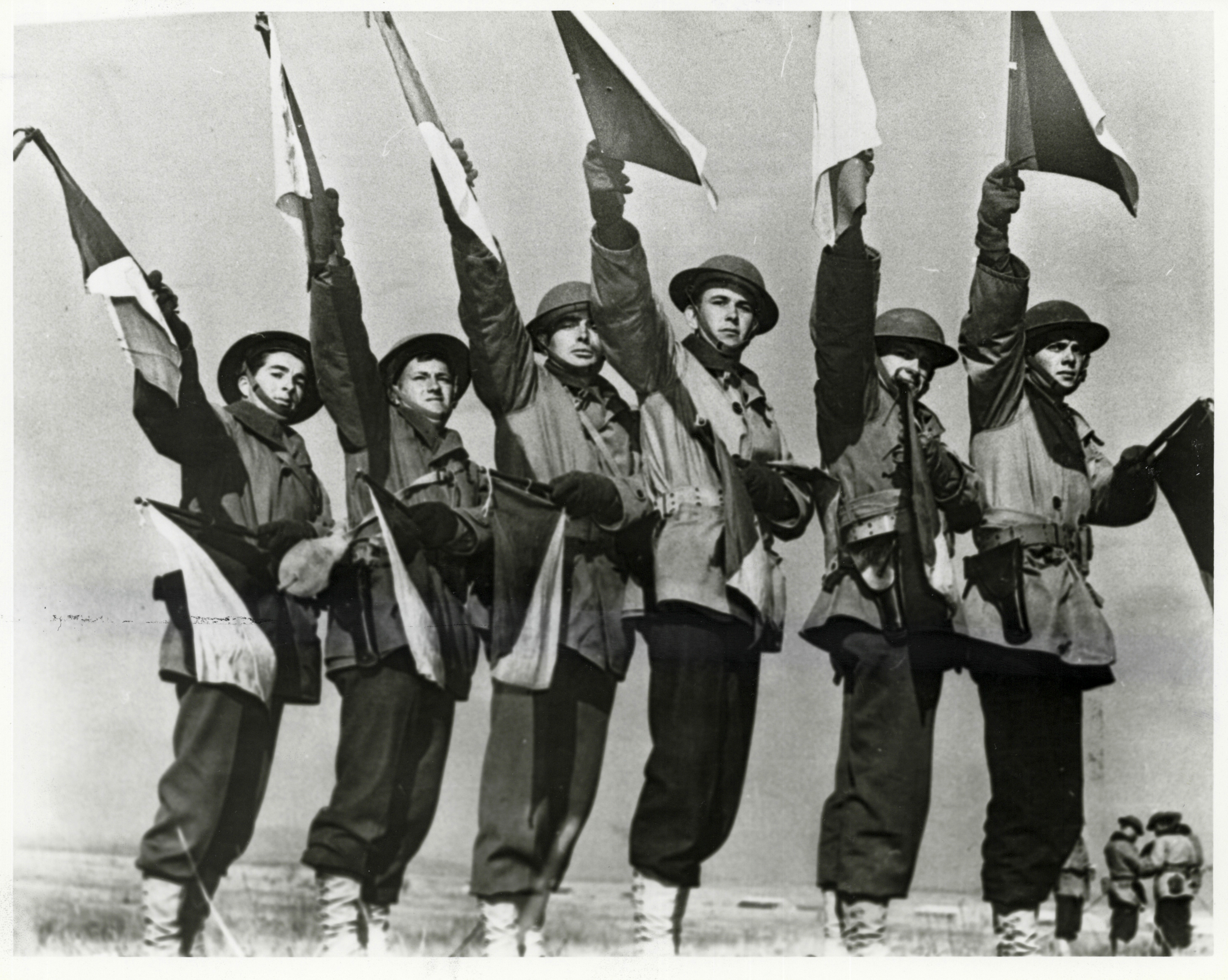
National Guard training, 1941

One hundred forty thousand Guardsmen were mobilized during the Korean War and over 63,000 for Operation Desert Storm. They have also participated in U.S. peacekeeping operations in Somalia, Haiti, Saudi Arabia, Kuwait, Bosnia, and Kosovo and for natural disasters, strikes, riots and security for the Olympic Games when they have been in the States.

Following World War II, the National Guard aviation units that had previously been part of the U.S. Army Air Corps and its successor organization, the U.S. Army Air Forces, became the Air National Guard (ANG), one of two reserve components of the newly established United States Air Force.

=== Domestic affairs ===
Within hours of the devastating San Francisco earthquake and fire of April 1906, the California National Guard maintained order, protected lives and property and distributed relief supplies. Its role was controversial and it was withdrawn after 40 days. Federal troops also were used.

On September 24, 1957, President Dwight D. Eisenhower federalized the entire Arkansas National Guard to ensure the safe entry of the Little Rock Nine to Little Rock Central High School the following day. Governor Orval Faubus had previously used members of the guard to deny the students entry to the school.

The New York National Guard were ordered by Governor Nelson A. Rockefeller to respond to the Rochester 1964 race riot in July of that year. The California Army National Guard were mobilized by the governor of California Edmund Gerald Brown Sr. during the Watts Riots, in August 1965, to provide security and help restore order.

Elements of the Ohio Army National Guard were ordered to Kent State University by Ohio's governor Jim Rhodes to quell anti-Vietnam War protests, culminating in their shooting into a crowd of students on May 4, 1970, killing four and injuring nine. The massacre was followed by the Student strike of 1970.

During the Vietnam War, service in the National Guard was highly sought after, as an enlistment in the Guard generally prevented a person from being sent to combat; only a handful of Guard units were ever deployed to Vietnam. In 1968, the National Guard had only 1.26% black soldiers.

During the Vietnam War, Secretary of Defense Robert McNamara created the Selective Reserve Force (SRF) in October 1965. Since funding was not available to train and equip the entire National Guard adequately, the SRF would be a core group of 150,000 National Guardsmen available and ready for immediate overseas deployment if needed. SRF units were supposed to be authorized at 100% strength, receive priority training funds and modern equipment, and have more training and do 58 hours of drills of four hours each a year rather than the standard 48 hours of drills.

The 2nd Battalion 138th Field Artillery of the Kentucky Army National Guard was ordered to service in Vietnam in late 1968. The unit served in support of the regular 101st Airborne Division. The Battalion's C Battery lost nine men killed and thirty-two wounded when North Vietnamese troops overran Fire Base Tomahawk on June 19, 1969.

During the early 1980s, the governors of California and Maine refused to allow deployment of their states' National Guard units to Central America. In 1986, Congress passed the Montgomery Amendment, which prohibited state governors from withholding their consent. In 1990, the Supreme Court ruled against the governor of Minnesota, who had sued over the deployment of the state's National Guard units to Central America.

During the 1992 Los Angeles Riots, when portions of south central Los Angeles erupted in chaos, overwhelming the Los Angeles Police Department's ability to contain the violence, the California Army National Guard and selected units of the California Air National Guard were mobilized to help restore order. The National Guard were attributed with five shootings of people suspected of violating the curfew order placed on the city.

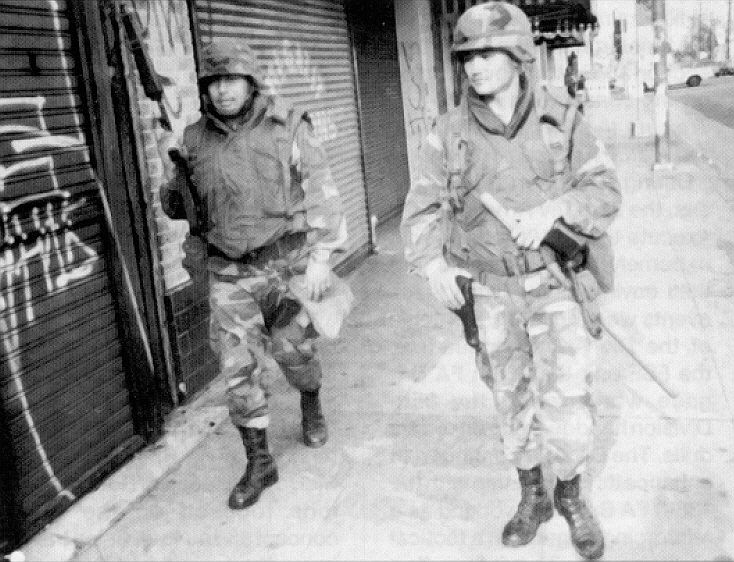
Following the 1992 Los Angeles riots, 4,000 National Guardsmen patrolled the city.

During the 1993 Waco siege of the Branch Davidians, elements of the Alabama and Texas Army National Guard were called in to assist the ATF and the follow on effort by the Federal Bureau of Investigation; the National Guard's involvement was limited to several specific areas; surveillance and reconnaissance, transport, maintenance and repairs, training and instruction, helicopters, unarmed tactical ground vehicles. The Army National Guard helicopters were also used to do photographic reconnaissance work. Training for ATF agents included such subjects as Close Quarters Combat, and combat medical instruction, and a mock up of the Mount Carmel complex was constructed at Fort Hood, Texas for rehearsals. ATF also received several surplus helmets, flack vests, canteens, first aid dressings, empty magazines, and some night-vision equipment, in addition to MREs and diesel fuel. The FBI would request and receive the use of Bradley Armored Fighting Vehicles, and tank retrieval vehicles, as well as overflights by UH-1 and CH-47 helicopters.

=== Post Cold War reductions ===
As a result of the Bottom Up Review and post-Cold War force cutbacks, the Army National Guard maneuver force was reduced to eight divisions (from ten; the 26th Infantry and 50th Armored were consolidated in the northeastern states) and fifteen 'enhanced brigades,' which were supposed to be ready for combat operations, augmenting the active force, within 90 days. (Note: The fifteen enhanced brigades included the 27th (NY), 29th (HI), 32nd (WI), 41st (OR), 45th (OK), 48th (GA), 53rd (FL), 76th (IN), 81st (WA), 256th (LA), 116th Cavalry Brigade (ID), 155th (MS), 218th (SC), and the 278th Armored Cavalry Regiment (TN).)

=== 2000s ===
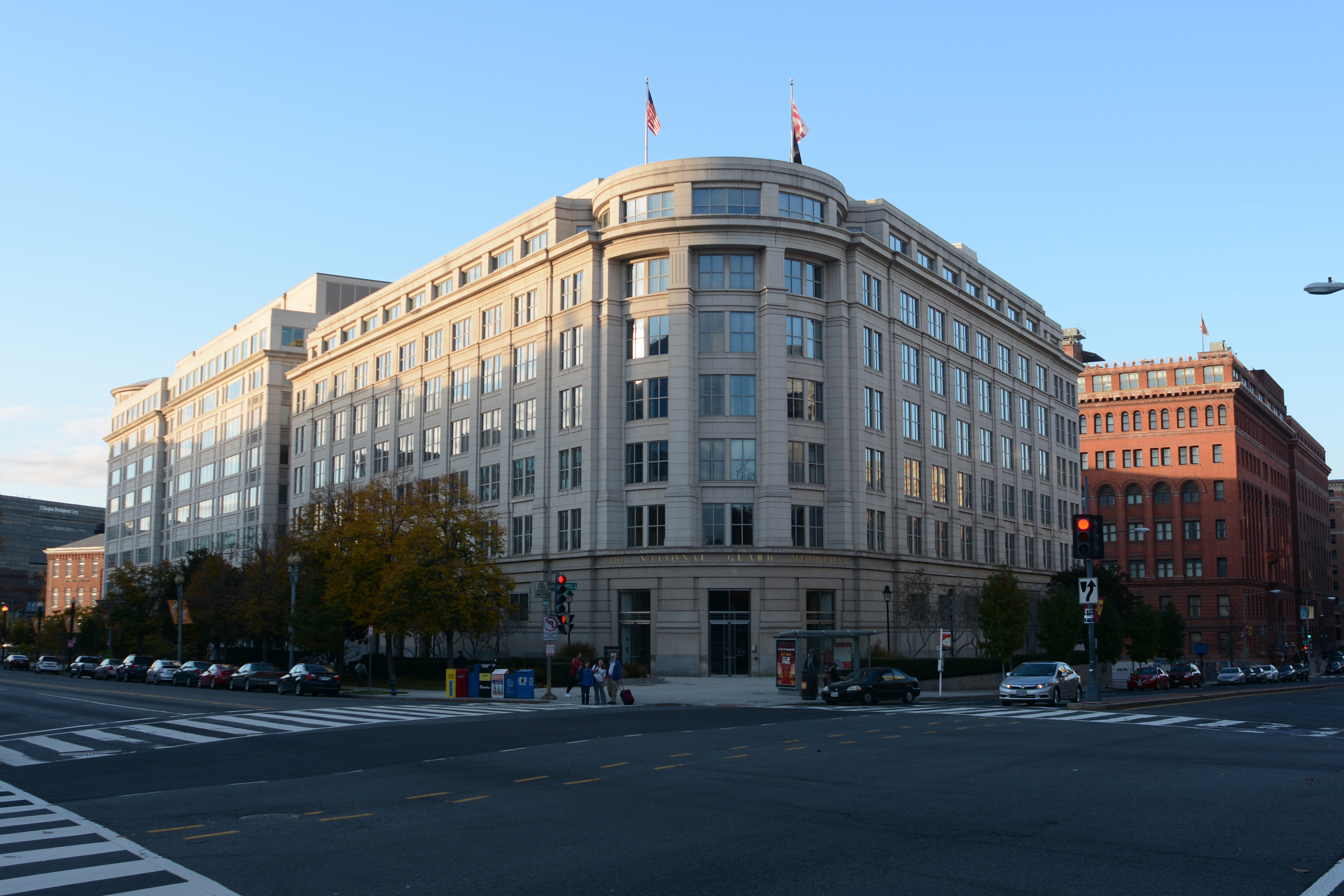
The National Guard Memorial Museum in Washington, D.C.

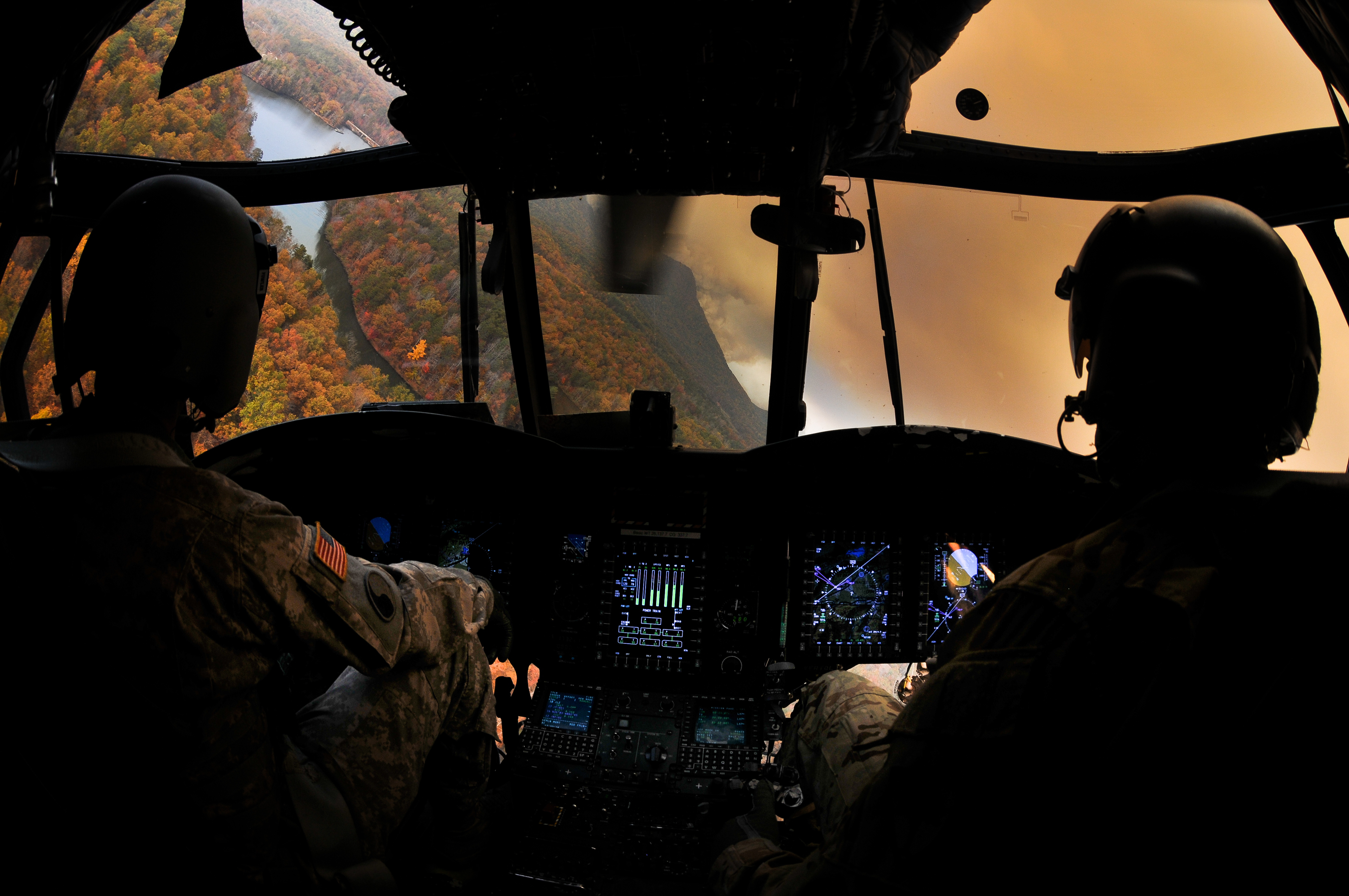
A South Carolina Army National Guard CH-47 Chinook supporting the South Carolina Forestry Commission to contain a remote fire near the top of Pinnacle Mountain in Pickens County, South Carolina, November 17, 2016

National Guard units played a major role in providing security and assisting recovery efforts in the aftermath of the September 11 attacks in 2001 and Hurricane Katrina in 2005.

In 2005, National Guard members and reservists were said to constitute a larger percentage of frontline fighting forces than in any war in U.S. history (about 43 percent in Iraq and 55 percent in Afghanistan). There were more than 183,366 National Guard members and reservists on active duty nationwide who left behind about 300,000 dependents, according to U.S. Defense Department statistics. In 2011, Army Chief of Staff Gen. George W. Casey Jr. stated that "Every Guard brigade has deployed to Iraq or Afghanistan, and over 300,000 Guardsmen have deployed in this war."

In January and February 2007, National Guard troops from 8 states were activated to go help shovel snow, drop hay for starving cattle, deliver food and necessities to stranded people in their houses, and help control traffic and rescue stranded motorists in blizzards dropping feet of snow across the country.

In the first quarter of 2007, United States Secretary of Defense Robert M. Gates announced changes to the Guard deployment policy aimed at shorter and more predictable deployments for National Guard troops. "Gates said his goal is for Guard members to serve a one-year deployment no more than every five years... Gates is imposing a one-year limit to the length of deployment for National Guard Soldiers, effective immediately." Prior to this time, Guard troops deployed for a standard one-year deployment to Iraq or Afghanistan would serve for 18 or more months including training and transit time. During the transition to the new policy for all troops in the pipeline, deployed or soon to be deployed, some will face deployments faster than every five years. "The one-to-five year cycle does not include activations for state emergencies."

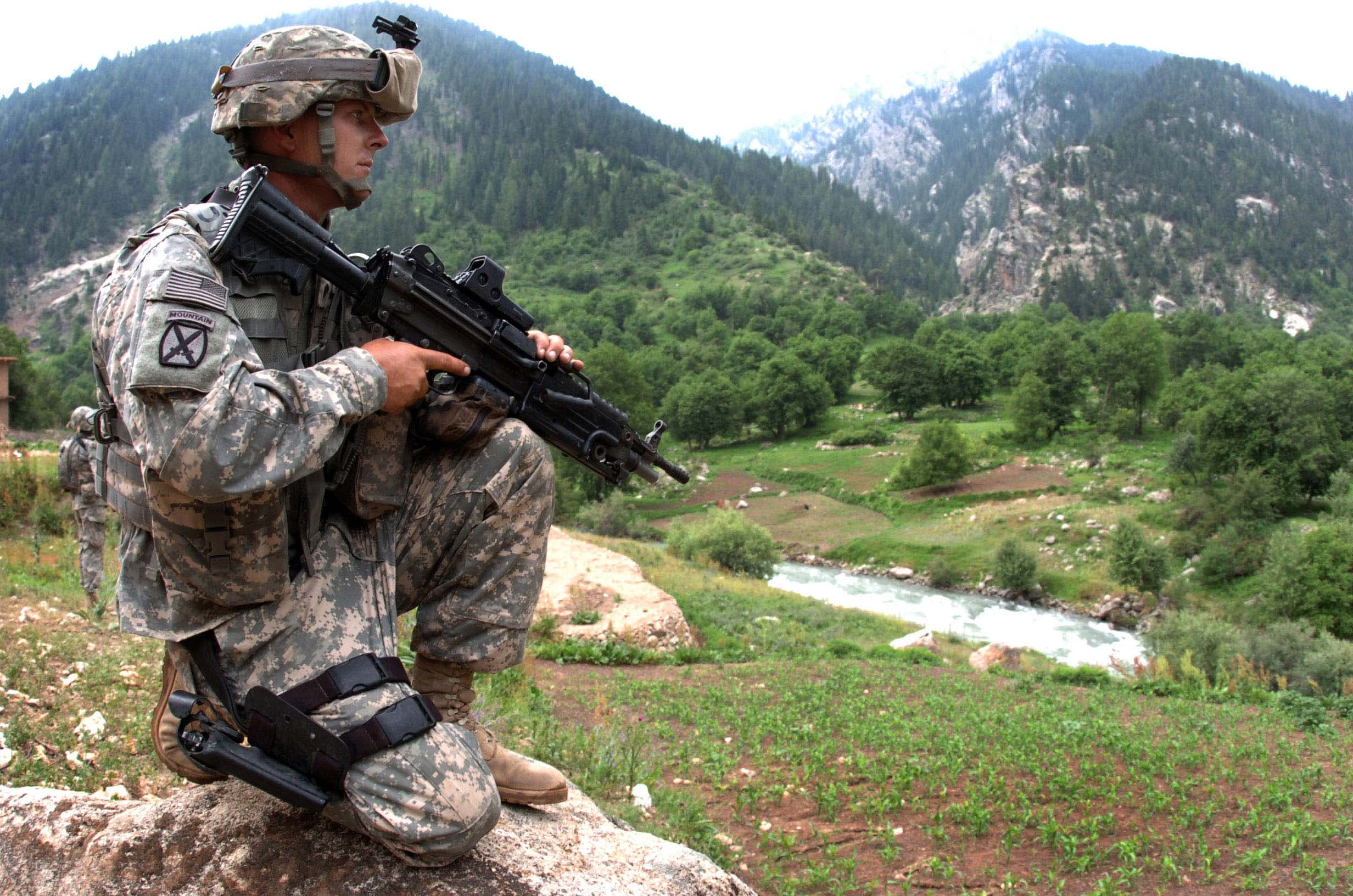
An Army National Guardsman of the 1st Battalion, 151st Infantry Regiment in Parun, Afghanistan. He is wearing a 10th Mountain Division Former Wartime Service SSI.

Prior to the attacks against the United States on September 11, 2001, the National Guard's general policy regarding mobilization was that Guardsmen would be required to serve no more than one year cumulative on active duty (with no more than six months overseas) for each five years of regular drill. Due to strains placed on active duty units following the attacks, the possible mobilization time was increased to 18 months (with no more than one year overseas). Additional strains placed on military units as a result of the invasion of Iraq further increased the amount of time a Guardsman could be mobilized to 24 months. Current Department of Defense policy is that no Guardsman is involuntarily activated for more than 24 months (cumulative) in one six-year enlistment period.

Traditionally, most National Guard personnel serve "One weekend a month, two weeks a year", although personnel in highly operational or high demand units serve far more frequently. Typical examples are pilots, navigators and aircrewmen in active flying assignments, primarily in the Air National Guard, and to a lesser extent in the Army National Guard, and special operations airmen and soldiers in both. A significant number also serve in a full-time capacity in roles such as Active Guard and Reserve (AGR) or Air Reserve Technician or Army Reserve Technician (ART).

The "One weekend a month, two weeks a year" slogan has lost most of its relevance since the Iraq War, when nearly 28% of total U.S. forces in Iraq and Afghanistan at the end of 2007 consisted of mobilized personnel of the National Guard and other Reserve components. In July 2012, the Army's top general stated his intention to increase the annual drill requirement from two weeks per year to up to seven weeks per year.

Prior to 2008, the functions of Agricultural Development Teams were within Provincial Reconstruction Teams of the U.S. government. Today, ADTs consist of soldiers and airmen from the Army National Guard and the Air National Guard. Today, ADTs bring "an effective platform for enhanced dialogue, building confidence, sharing interests, and increasing cooperation amongst the disparate peoples and tribes of Afghanistan." These teams are not only affiliated with the military, they frequently work across agencies, for example with USAID and the Department of State. ADTs provide education and expertise on the ground, while also providing security and order that is traditionally affiliated with the military. These teams have been essential to the counterinsurgency efforts in Afghanistan as a public diplomacy tool to build relations with the local people in the tribes and provinces of the country.

ADTs provide classroom instruction and teachings to Afghans about how to improve their farming practices during non-seasonal growing months, which allows the farmers to use skills in the winter to prepare for farming in the summer and fall. This enhances agricultural production and the Afghan economy as a whole. Agricultural education also improves lines of communication and builds trust between the people, the U.S. government, and the Host Nation. Additionally, through word of mouth in the provinces ideas are spread that inform others about these farming techniques, that may not have had direct interaction with the ADTs. The National Guard ADTs also introduce their U.S. civilian colleagues to the Afghan University personnel, which further strengthens relations and trust in the U.S. efforts in Afghanistan.

ADTs also enhance public diplomacy in Afghanistan by providing security to the local provinces they are working within. This tool has provided the teams with the civilian-military partnership that is needed to conduct public diplomacy and defeat the insurgents in Afghanistan. President Barack Obama said that the U.S. will enhance agricultural development instead of big reconstruction projects to build Afghanistan's economy, to have an immediate impact on the Afghan people. Today, these projects include "...basic gardening practices, to large watershed and irrigation projects. There are also projects that teach bee keeping and livestock production: all of which will have a positive impact on unemployment, hunger, and the ability to sustain future generations.

More and more Afghan tribal leaders have been requesting additional ADTs, which illustrates how important the use of public diplomacy has been in the efforts to win the trust of the Afghan people. The case study from Nangarhar Province in Afghanistan serves as an excellent example. This province is one of the most stable and secure provinces in Afghanistan. For example, over 100,000 Afghans have returned to province; the province has also been declared poppy-free in 2007 by the UN. Additionally, most districts within the province have all-weather paved roads and it is also one of the most productive agricultural regions in Afghanistan.

In 2006, Congress considered giving the president the full authority to mobilize National Guard units within the U.S. without the consent of state governors. However, this was met with resistance from states governors and members of the National Guard. The act was eventually passed, but instead, the president's authority was expanded to mobilize the reserve components for domestic operations without the consent of the governor, only during a natural disaster, terrorist attack, epidemic or other public health emergency. The following year, that authority was repealed.

=== 2020s ===
In 2020, the National Guard was activated for 11,000,000 "man days" in support of natural disasters, civil unrest, food distribution at food banks, and COVID-19 testing and vaccination. This was the highest number of activation days since World War II.

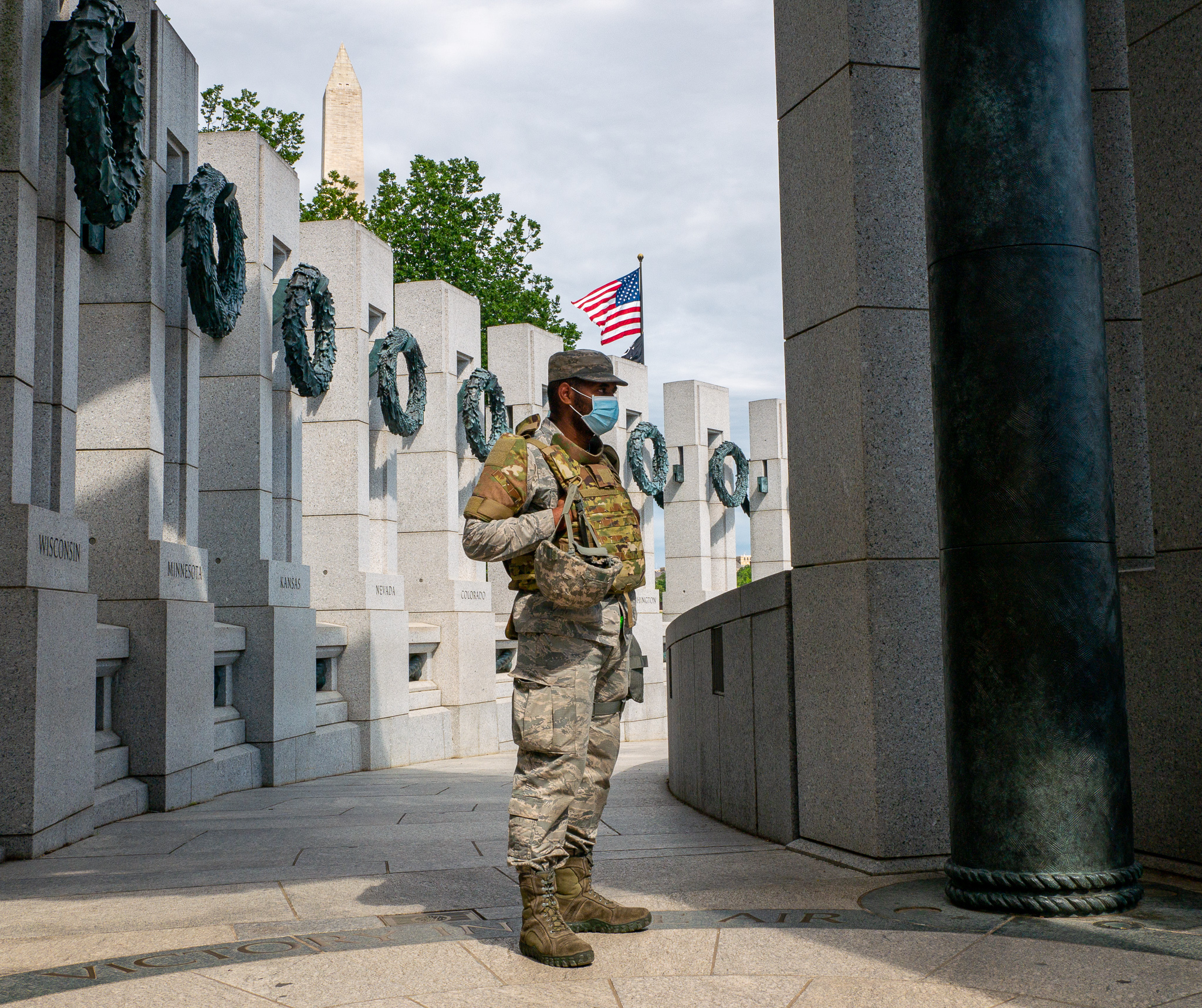
An Air National Guardsman guarding the World War II Memorial in Washington, D.C. during the George Floyd riots of June 2020

In 2025, 2,000 soldiers of the California National Guard were federalized by President Donald Trump by a presidential memorandum to respond to incidents of violence and civil disorder against Immigration and Customs Enforcement (ICE) and other United States Government personnel who were performing Federal functions in Los Angeles for 60 days. On August 11, Trump announced the deployment of National Guards to Washington D.C. An additional deployment of National Guard troops to Memphis, Tennessee was announced on September 15.

Proposals for a Domestic Civil Disturbance Quick Reaction Force consisting of two units of 300 soldiers of the National Guard were reported by The Washington Post in August 2025. The force would be used to suppress civil unrest at short notice.

== Relevant laws ==
=== Constitutional Basis ===
Although the U.S. Constitution does not explicitly mention the "National Guard", it uses the term "Militia" to describe a state-based military force:

Clause 15. The Congress shall have Power * * * To provide for calling forth the Militia to execute the Laws of the Union, suppress Insurrections and repel Invasions. Clause 16. The Congress shall have Power * * * To provide for organizing, arming, and disciplining, the Militia, and for governing such Part of them as may be employed in the Service of the United States, reserving to the States respectively, the Appointment of the Officers, and the Authority of training the Militia according to the discipline prescribed by Congress.

These clauses serve as the constitutional basis for the modern National Guard. The Constitution outlines the federal and state governments' authority over militias in several clauses, including granting Congress the power to call forth, organize, arm, and discipline the Militia. It also designates the president as the commander in chief of the state Militias, when they are called into service for the United States.

The National Guard was formally established by Congress through later legislation, as described in the following section.

=== Federal Legislative Acts ===
The United States Congress has enacted various laws that control the National Guard:

1. The Militia Acts of 1792
  Providing for the authority of the president to call out the Militia, and providing federal standards for the organization of the Militia.
  For the 111 years that the Militia Act of 1792 remained in effect, it defined the position of the militia in relation to the federal government. The War of 1812 tested this uniquely American defense establishment. To fight the War of 1812, the republic formed a small regular military and trained it to protect the frontiers and coastlines. Although it performed poorly in the offensive against Canada, the small force of regulars backed by a well-armed militia, accomplished its defensive mission well. Generals like Andrew Jackson proved that, just as they had in the Revolution, regulars and militia could be effective when employed as a team.
2. The Insurrection Act of 1807
3. The Militia Act of 1862
  Providing for the service of persons of African descent in the Militia, and the emancipation of slaves owned by Confederates.
4. Title 18, U.S. Code, Section 1385: The Posse Comitatus Act of June 18, 1878
  Reaction in Congress against the Reconstruction-era suspensions of Southern states' rights to organize militias led to the passage of the Posse Comitatus Act, restricting any person's use of the U.S. Army and, as later amended, the U.S. Air Force in domestic law enforcement (use of the Navy and Marine Corps, being uniformed services within the Department of Defense, is similarly restricted by statute). The U.S. Coast Guard, in its peacetime role within the Department of Homeland Security, and the National Guard, when not in Federal Service, are specifically not limited by this act.
5. The States revise the military codes – 1881 to 1892
6. The Militia Act of 1903
  Established the creation of the National Guard as the primary organized reserve force for the U.S. armed forces.
7. National Defense Act of 1916
  This act abandoned the idea of an expandable Regular Army and firmly established the traditional concept of the citizens' army as the keystone of the United States defense forces. It established the concept of merging the National Guard, the Army Reserve, and the Regular Army into the Army of the United States in time of war. The act further expanded the National Guard's role, and guaranteed the State militias' status as the Army's primary reserve force. The law mandated use of the term "National Guard" for that force, and the president was given authority, in case of war or national emergency, to mobilize the National Guard for the duration of the emergency. The number of yearly drills increased from 24 to 48 and annual training from five to 15 days. Drill pay was authorized for the first time.
8. The National Defense Act Amendments of 1920
  This act established that the chief of the Militia Bureau (later the National Guard Bureau) would be a National Guard officer, that National Guard officers would be assigned to the general staff and that the divisions, as used by the Guard in World War I, would be reorganized.
9. The National Guard Mobilization Act of 1933
  Made the National Guard a component of the Army.
10. The National Security Act of 1947
  Section 207 (f) established the Air National Guard, under the National Guard Bureau.
11. The Total Force Policy from 1973
  Requires all active and reserve military organizations be treated as a single force.
12. The Montgomery Amendment to the National Defense Authorization Act for Fiscal Year 1987
  Provides that a governor cannot withhold consent with regard to active duty outside the United States because of any objection to the location, purpose, type, or schedule of such duty. This law was challenged and upheld by the Supreme Court of the United States in 1990 in Perpich v. Department of Defense.
13. The John Warner Defense Authorization Act of 2007 Pub. L. 109–364 (text) (PDF)
  Federal law was changed in section 1076 so that the governor of a state is no longer the sole commander in chief of their state's National Guard during emergencies within the state. The president of the United States could then take total control of a state's National Guard units without the governor's consent. In a letter to Congress, all 50 governors opposed the increase in power of the president over the National Guard.
14. The National Defense Authorization Act of 2008 Pub. L. 110–181 (text) (PDF)
  Repeals provisions in section 1076 in Pub.L. 109-364 but still enables the president to call up the National Guard for active federal military service during Congressionally sanctioned national emergency or war. Places the National Guard Bureau directly under the Department of Defense as a joint activity. Elevated the Chief of the National Guard Bureau from a three-star to a four-star general.
15. The National Defense Authorization Act of 2012 Pub. L. 115–91 (text) (PDF)
  Added the Chief, National Guard Bureau to the Joint Chiefs of Staff.
16. The National Defense Authorization Act of 2024 Pub. L. 118–31 (text) (PDF)
  Elevated the Vice Chief of the National Guard Bureau from a three-star to a four-star general.

=== Defend the Guard ===
Defend the Guard is state-level legislative initiative which would require Congress to make an official declaration of war before National Guard troops can be transferred from state control to federal active duty combat. Supporters of the bill claim that this law would pressure Congress to conform to the Constitution and declare war when American soldiers are sent overseas to perform military actions.

In 2024, over 80% of Texas GOP voters voted in favor of a Defend the Guard non-binding ballot measure which stated, "The Texas Legislature should prohibit the deployment of the Texas National Guard to a foreign conflict unless Congress first formally declares war." In 2024, the New Hampshire GOP added a Defend the Guard plank to the Federalism section of its platform which states, "(We) Demand that Congress exercise their sole authority over war declarations and protect the New Hampshire National Guard by requiring a Congressional declaration of war prior to any National Guardsman deployment to overseas combat zones."

== Notable members ==
=== Presidents ===
Militia service was a common trait among presidents of the United States, 18 of whom have served in colonial or state militias and two have served in the National Guard since it was established in 1903. Among these, three served in colonial militias (George Washington, Thomas Jefferson and James Madison), 15 served in state militias (James Monroe, Andrew Jackson, William Henry Harrison, Millard Fillmore, Franklin Pierce, James Buchanan, Abraham Lincoln, Andrew Johnson, Ulysses S. Grant, Rutherford B. Hayes, James Garfield, Chester A. Arthur, William Henry Harrison, William McKinley and Theodore Roosevelt), one in the Army National Guard (Harry S. Truman) and one (George W. Bush) served in the Air National Guard.

=== Other notable members ===
- Pete Hegseth, 29th Secretary of Defense
- John R. Bolton, former United States Representative to the United Nations and National Security Advisor
- Scott Philip Brown, former United States Senator from Massachusetts
- William J. Donovan, founder of the Office of Strategic Services
- Joni Ernst, Junior Senator from Iowa
- Gabe Evans, United States Representatives from Colorado
- Joe Foss, Governor of South Dakota, Medal of Honor recipient in World War II
- Tulsi Gabbard, 8th Director of National Intelligence, former United States Representative from Hawaii
- Lindsey Graham, former Senator from South Carolina
- Ralph Haben, former Speaker of the Florida House of Representatives
- Ken Holtzman, two-time major league baseball All Star pitcher
- Brock Lesnar, professional wrestler and former mixed martial artist
- Audie Murphy, highly decorated soldier from WWII, prolific 1950s actor
- Dan Quayle, 44th Vice President of the United States
- Cazzie Russell, former New York Knicks basketball player
- Babe Ruth, former Major League Baseball player
- Tom Selleck, actor, Magnum, P.I.
- Rick Story, mixed martial artist in the UFC
- Tim Walz, Governor of Minnesota, former United States Representative from Minnesota
- Trent Kelly, United States Representative from Mississippi

== Number of guardsmen by state, territory and D.C. ==
A member of the National Guard, often called a "guardsman," is a person who has signed an Enlistment Contract and has subscribed to an Enlistment Oath, is still alive, or has not yet been discharged. The subscription to the oath (typically a recitation) and the signature must be witnessed by a person, typically a Guard officer, authorized as an official witness. The term of the enlistment, or membership, runs from the date on the contract through the date on the discharge or the death certificate. (Note: The National Guard enlistment oath is: "I do hereby acknowledge to have voluntarily enlisted this __ day of ____, ____, in the ______ National Guard of the State of ______ for a period of __ year(s) under the conditions prescribed by law, unless sooner discharged by proper authority. I, ________, do solemnly swear (or affirm) that I will support and defend the Constitution of the United States and of the State of ______ against all enemies, foreign and domestic; that I will bear true faith and allegiance to them; and that I will obey the orders of the President of the United States and the Governor of ______ and the orders of the officers appointed over me, according to law and regulations. So help me God.")

The "number of guardsmen" is a statistic generated by the Defense Manpower Data Center (DMDC), an agency of the DoD tasked with tracking the identities of all persons in the active military, its reserves, and civilians employed by it. Membership in the Guard may be regarded as an independent variable. It changes constantly. Its value at any instant cannot be known exactly. It can, however, be estimated from the records of the DMDC. Its data and reports are for the most part inaccessible to the general public, but it does make available some reports under the category "DoD Personal, Workforce Reports & Publications."

The series "Military and Civilian Personnel by Service/Agency by State/Country (Updated Quarterly)," containing the statistics on membership in the National Guard by state, territory, and D.C., is updated every 3rd month at the end of the month. For example, one was generated on June 30, 2017. Like all statistics, these numbers of guardsmen are a sample culled according to a certain method. The report states that it uses the sources: "Active Duty Master File, RCCPDS, APF Civilian Master, CTS Deployment File, Civilian Deployment." The probabilities of the statistics being accurate to various percentages are not stated.

Below is a sample summary of a profile of National Guard membership as of September 30, 2020. Only the non-total columns come from the source. The totals are calculated from the data.

=== Sortable table ===
| State/Territory | Army National Guard | Air National Guard | Total |
|---|---|---|---|
| Alabama | 9,755 | 2,444 | 12,199 |
| Alaska | 1,649 | 2,158 | 3,807 |
| Arizona | 5,345 | 2,570 | 7,910 |
| Arkansas | 6,556 | 1,953 | 8,509 |
| California | 13,240 | 4,896 | 18,136 |
| Colorado | 3,778 | 1,802 | 5,580 |
| Connecticut | 3,664 | 1,171 | 4,835 |
| Delaware | 1,686 | 1,056 | 2,742 |
| Florida | 9,830 | 2,118 | 11,948 |
| Georgia | 11,294 | 2,844 | 14,138 |
| Hawaii | 2,911 | 2,318 | 5,229 |
| Idaho | 3,185 | 1,336 | 4,521 |
| Illinois | 10,469 | 2,911 | 13,380 |
| Indiana | 10,491 | 1,945 | 12,436 |
| Iowa | 6,829 | 1,923 | 8,752 |
| Kansas | 4,446 | 2,180 | 6,626 |
| Kentucky | 6,577 | 1,260 | 7,837 |
| Louisiana | 9,959 | 1,529 | 11,488 |
| Maine | 1,842 | 1,075 | 2,917 |
| Maryland | 4,586 | 1,840 | 6,426 |
| Massachusetts | 5,880 | 2,064 | 7,944 |
| Michigan | 8,378 | 2,448 | 10,826 |
| Minnesota | 10,901 | 2,269 | 13,170 |
| Mississippi | 9,060 | 2,637 | 11,697 |
| Missouri | 9,355 | 2,244 | 11,599 |
| Montana | 2,408 | 932 | 3,340 |
| Nebraska | 3,244 | 1,005 | 4,249 |
| Nevada | 3,302 | 1,199 | 4,501 |
| New Hampshire | 1,642 | 937 | 2,579 |
| New Jersey | 6,113 | 2,373 | 8,486 |
| New Mexico | 2,875 | 989 | 3,864 |
| New York | 10,420 | 5,685 | 16,105 |
| North Carolina | 9,721 | 1,467 | 11,188 |
| North Dakota | 2,990 | 1,163 | 4,153 |
| Ohio | 11,321 | 5,092 | 16,413 |
| Oklahoma | 6,398 | 2,225 | 8,623 |
| Oregon | 5,504 | 2,391 | 7,895 |
| Pennsylvania | 13,806 | 4,069 | 17,875 |
| Rhode Island | 2,049 | 1,019 | 3,068 |
| South Carolina | 9,270 | 1,250 | 10,520 |
| South Dakota | 3,149 | 1,112 | 4,261 |
| Tennessee | 9,256 | 3,490 | 12,746 |
| Texas | 18,617 | 3,390 | 22,007 |
| Utah | 5,666 | 1,473 | 7,139 |
| Vermont | 2,229 | 1,000 | 3,229 |
| Virginia | 7,127 | 1,469 | 8,596 |
| Washington | 5,538 | 2,005 | 7,543 |
| West Virginia | 4,052 | 2,125 | 6,177 |
| Wisconsin | 7,219 | 2,333 | 9,552 |
| Wyoming | 1,586 | 1,250 | 2,836 |
| Puerto Rico | 5,909 | 1,062 | 6,971 |
| Guam | 1,182 | 377 | 1,559 |
| District of Columbia | 1,281 | 1,289 | 2,570 |
| Virgin Islands | 594 | 61 | 655 |
| Totals | 336,129 | 107,414 | 443,543 |

== See also ==
- 19th Special Forces Group – National Guard unit of the U.S. Army Special Forces
- 20th Special Forces Group – National Guard unit of the U.S. Army Special Forces
- Minutemen
- Youth Challenge Program
- National Guard Memorial Museum
