= Perpich v. Department of Defense =

- Supreme Court of the United States

Argued March 27, 1990 Decided June 11, 1990
- Full case name: Rudy Perpich, Governor of Minnesota, et al. v. Department of Defense, et al.
- Citations: 496 U.S. 334 (more) 110 S. Ct. 2418; 110 L. Ed. 2d 312; 1990 U.S. LEXIS 3012

Case history
- Prior: 666 F. Supp. 1319 (D. Minn. 1987), affirmed, 880 F.2d 11 (8th Cir. 1989); cert. granted, 493 U.S. 1017 (1990).

Holding
- Article I's plain language, read as a whole, establishes that Congress may authorize members of the National Guard of the United States to be ordered to active federal duty for purposes of training outside the United States without either the consent of a state governor or the declaration of a national emergency.

Court membership
- Chief Justice William Rehnquist Associate Justices William J. Brennan Jr. · Byron White; Thurgood Marshall · Harry Blackmun; John P. Stevens · Sandra Day O'Connor; Antonin Scalia · Anthony Kennedy

Case opinion
- Majority: Stevens, joined by unanimous

Laws applied
- U.S. Const. Art. I § 8

Perpich v. Department of Defense, 496 U.S. 334 (1990), was a case decided by the United States Supreme Court concerning the Militia Clauses of Article I, Section 8, of the United States Constitution, in which the court held that Congress may authorize members of the National Guard to be ordered to active federal duty for purposes of training outside the United States without either the consent of the governor of the affected state or the declaration of a national emergency. The plaintiff was Rudy Perpich, governor of Minnesota at the time.

In 1986, after governors George Deukmejian of California and Joseph E. Brennan of Maine refused to allow the deployment of their states' National Guard units to Central America for training, Congress passed the Montgomery Amendment, which prohibited state governors from withholding their consent. Massachusetts governor Michael Dukakis had also challenged the law, but lost in U.S. District Court in Boston in 1988.

== See also ==
- State defense force#Federal activation
