= American Trucking Ass'ns v. Smith =

American Trucking Associations, Inc. v. Smith
- Supreme Court of the United States

Decided June 4, 1990
- Full case name: American Trucking Ass'ns v. Smith
- Citations: 496 U.S. 167 (more)

Holding
- The Court's decision in American Trucking Associations, Inc. v. Scheiner did not apply retroactively.

Court membership
- Chief Justice William Rehnquist Associate Justices William J. Brennan Jr. · Byron White; Thurgood Marshall · Harry Blackmun; John P. Stevens · Sandra Day O'Connor; Antonin Scalia · Anthony Kennedy

Case opinions
- Majority: O'Connor
- Concurrence: Scalia
- Dissent: Stevens, joined by Brennan, Marshall, Blackmun

American Trucking Associations, Inc. v. Smith, 496 U.S. 167 (1990), was a United States Supreme Court case in which the Court held that the Court's decision in American Trucking Associations, Inc. v. Scheiner did not apply retroactively.

== Description ==
In Scheiner, the Court held an Arkansas road tax unconstitutional because it violated the Commerce Clause. Afterward, the Supreme Court remanded the case to the Arkansas Supreme Court. While the case remained pending, the state of Arkansas began holding the collected taxes in escrow on the order of Circuit Justice Harry Blackmun. The Arkansas Supreme Court then reconsidered the tax in light of Scheiner and ruled it unconstitutional. However, the court declined to order refunds for taxes paid before the August escrow order, saying Scheiner could not be applied retroactively. The court nevertheless determined that the tax money paid into escrow after the August order should be refunded.

In this case, the Supreme Court allowed that decision to stand, saying that not all unforeseeable changes in the law require relitigation.

The dissent argued that foreseeability should have been irrelevant to remedying the constitutional violation. There had not been a final determination on the merits about whether the taxes should have been refunded. When the tax was held to be unconstitutional, the state supreme court simply declared that there would not be a refund of money paid before the escrow began. For the dissenters, that meant the issue could still be resolved by courts and a refund should have been on the table.
