= Peel v. Attorney Disciplinary Commission of Illinois =

- Supreme Court of the United States

Argued January 17, 1990 Decided June 4, 1990
- Full case name: Peel v. Attorney Registration and Disciplinary Commission of Illinois
- Docket no.: 88-1775
- Citations: 496 U.S. 91 (more)
- Argument: Oral argument

Case history
- Prior: Respondent censured, In Re Peel, 126 Ill. 2d 397 (1989); certiorari granted, 492 U.S. 917 (1989)

Holding
- Attorney advertising that accurately stated a private professional certification was not misleading, and therefore was protected as commercial speech under the First Amendment.

Court membership
- Chief Justice William Rehnquist Associate Justices William J. Brennan Jr. · Byron White; Thurgood Marshall · Harry Blackmun; John P. Stevens · Sandra Day O'Connor; Antonin Scalia · Anthony Kennedy

Case opinions
- Plurality: Stevens, joined by Brennan, Blackmun, and Kennedy
- Concurrence: Marshall, joined by Brennan
- Dissent: White
- Dissent: O'Connor, joined by Rehnquist and Scalia

Laws applied
- U.S. Const. amend I

Peel v. Attorney Disciplinary Commission of Illinois, 496 US 91 (1990), was a decision of the Supreme Court of the United States that Illinois' rule against attorneys advertising themselves as "certified" violated their freedom of speech under the First Amendment. The Illinois Attorney Registration and Disciplinary Commission (IARDC) had found that Peel's letterhead, which stated that he was "Certified Civil Trial Specialist By the National Board of Trial Advocacy," had broken state professional rules, and the Illinois Supreme Court had adopted their recommendation of public sanction. The U.S. Supreme Court reversed, saying the letterhead was truthful, and the First Amendment favored disclosure over concealing information.

== Background ==
Gary E. Peel was admitted to the bar in Illinois in 1968, in Arizona in 1979, and in Missouri in 1981, and his law practice was located in Edwardsville, Illinois. In 1981 he earned a "Certificate in Civil Trial Advocacy" from the National Board of Trial Advocacy (NBTA), which was renewed in 1986. The requirements for this certificate included extensive trial experience, completion of relevant continuing legal education classes, and passing a day-long exam. In 1983, Peel started including a mention of this certificate on his letterhead, along with the states where he was licensed to practice:

Gary E. Peel

Certified Civil Trial Specialist

By the National Board of Trial Advocacy

Licensed: Illinois, Missouri, Arizona.

However, the Illinois Code of Professional Responsibility (in Rule 2-105(a)(3)) stated "A lawyer or law firm may specify or designate any area or field of law in which he or its partners concentrates or limits his or its practice. Except as outlined in Rule 2-105(a), no lawyer may hold himself out as 'certified' or a 'specialist.' " The IARDC filed a complaint in 1987.

== Disciplinary proceedings ==
=== Arguments ===
The U.S. Supreme Court (in Bates v. State Bar of Arizona in 1977) had already ruled that advertising by attorneys was commercial speech, and therefore was protected by the First Amendment as long as it was not misleading. The IARDC thus argued that Peel's letterhead was misleading, and could be banned, because 1) the public might think the certificate was officially recognized in some way by the state of Illinois, which it was not, 2) "certified" was a technical term that the public might misunderstand, and 3) it was a claim about the quality of the services he offered, which was inherently misleading.

Peel, on the other hand, argued that the letterhead was simply the truth, and was relevant to a client's choice about which lawyer to hire. Moreover, given how strong the First Amendment's protection of free speech was, even commercial speech, the state should have to do more to justify its prohibition.

=== Decision of the Illinois Supreme Court ===
The Illinois Supreme Court ruled against Peel. To begin with, the Court felt it was important to protect the state's sole authority to license attorneys. Noting that the letter heading listed "Licensed: Illinois, Missouri, Arizona" immediately below the certification, the Court said it would easy for a member of the public (who might not know how the bar admission process worked) to not understand the difference. The Court also noted that the 1983 version of the Model Rules of Professional Conduct of the American Bar Association (ABA) contained a ban similar to Illinois' ban, and modifications to that model rule (Rule 7.4) in 1988 still left the ban on advertising of "certifications" intact. The official ABA comments to the modifications said,

If a lawyer practices only in certain fields, or will not accept matters except in such fields, the lawyer is permitted so to indicate. However, a lawyer is not permitted to state that the lawyer is a 'specialist,' practices a 'specialty,' or 'specializes in' particular fields. These terms have acquired a secondary meaning implying formal recognition as a specialist and, therefore, use of these terms is misleading. [An exception would apply in those States which provide procedures for certification or recognition of specialization and the lawyer has complied with such procedures.]

— In Re Peel, 126 Ill. 2d 397 (1988), (quoting a draft report of the ABA Standing Committee on Ethics and Professional Responsibility Report to the House of Delegates, dated August 29, 1988)

As such, the Court said the current ban was justified. Peel appealed to the U.S. Supreme Court.

== Decision of the U.S. Supreme Court ==
In a 5–4 decision, the U.S. Supreme Court reversed, holding that Peel's letterhead was protected commercial speech. The Court was rather divided about this case; the plurality opinion only represented four justices (Stevens—its author—joined by Brennan, Blackmun, and Kennedy), and only became the opinion of the Court because Marshall voted with them (but wrote a separate concurring opinion, which was also joined by Brennan). The dissent was also divided, with Justices White and O'Connor writing separately, and Rehnquist and Scalia joining O'Connor's opinion.

=== Plurality Opinion ===
In an opinion written by Justice Stevens, the Court said that Illinois was wrong to focus on "implied claims" rather than the "facial accuracy" of Peel's claim of certification. While not every consumer would investigate the significance of the certification or the trustworthiness of the NBTA, they certainly could do so if they wished:

Much like a trademark, the strength of a certification is measured by the quality of the organization for which it stands. The Illinois Supreme Court merely notes some confusion in the parties' explanation of one of those requirements. . . We find NBTA standards objectively clear, and, in any event, do not see why the degree of uncertainty identified by the State Supreme Court would make the letterhead inherently misleading to a consumer.

— Peel v. Attorney Disciplinary Commission, 496 U.S. at 103 (1990) (Stevens, writing for the plurality)

The Court also rejected the idea that merely potential confusion or misinformation was enough to justify a ban. Because of the importance of protecting free speech, a rule that was "broader than reasonably necessary to prevent the perceived evil" was unconstitutional. States could certainly ban sham certifications, but the plurality could see no justification for banning certifications from bona fide organizations like the NBTA.

=== Marshall's Concurrence ===
Marshall wrote separately to say that, although agreed Peel's letterhead was neither "actually" or "inherently" misleading—and therefore the ruling against Peel had to be overturned—nevertheless the current professional rule may be constitutional with slight modifications, because:

. . .the statement is nonetheless potentially misleading. The name "National Board of Trial Advocacy" could create the misimpression that the NBTA is an agency of the Federal Government. Although most lawyers undoubtedly know that the Federal Government does not regulate lawyers, most nonlawyers probably do not. . .

— Peel v. Attorney Disciplinary Commission, 496 U.S. at 112 (Marshall, concurring)

=== White's Dissent ===
White agreed with Marshall's analysis that the letterhead was potentially misleading. He voted differently from Marshall, though, because "As I see it, it is the petitioner who should have to clean up his advertisement so as to eliminate its potential to mislead."

=== O'Connor's Dissent ===
O'Connor, joined by Rehnquist and Scalia, argued that proper professional regulation of attorneys required more deference to states than the plurality had granted:

Charged with the duties of monitoring the legal profession within the State, the Supreme Court of Illinois is in a far better position than is this Court to determine which statements are misleading or likely to mislead. Although we are the final arbiters on the issue whether a statement is misleading as a matter of constitutional law, we should be more deferential to the State's experience with such statements. Illinois does not stand alone in its conclusion that claims of certification are so misleading as to require a blanket ban. At least 19 States and the District of Columbia currently ban claims of certification.

— Peel v. Attorney Disciplinary Commission, 496 U.S. at 121 (O'Connor, dissenting)
