= Pennsylvania v. Muniz =

- Supreme Court of the United States

Argued Feb. 27, 1990 Decided June 18, 1990
- Full case name: Pennsylvania v. Inocencio Muniz
- Docket no.: 89–213
- Citations: 496 U.S. 582 (more) 110 S.Ct. 2638

Court membership
- Chief Justice William Rehnquist Associate Justices William J. Brennan Jr. · Byron White; Thurgood Marshall · Harry Blackmun; John P. Stevens · Sandra Day O'Connor; Antonin Scalia · Anthony Kennedy

Case opinion
- Majority: Brennan (except for Part III–C)

Pennsylvania v. Muniz, 496 US 582 (1990), is a U.S. Supreme Court case involving the Self-incrimination Clause of the 5th Amendment and the meaning of “testimonial” under the 5th Amendment. A drunk-driving suspect, Muniz, made several incriminating statements while in police custody, and the Supreme Court held that only one of these statements was inadmissible because it was incriminating and testimonial. This testimonial statement was the suspect’s confused response when the police officer asked him for the date when he turned six years old. The other statements were admissible because they either counted as physical evidence for 5th Amendment purposes or fell under the routine booking exception to Miranda v. Arizona.

== Facts of the case ==
A police officer approached Muniz, who was in his car, suspecting him of driving under the influence of alcohol. The officer asked Muniz several questions and directed Muniz to perform sobriety tests, including “a ‘horizontal gaze nystagmus’ test, a ‘walk and turn’ test, and a ‘one leg stand’ test.” After Muniz admitted to drinking, the officer arrested him and took him to the booking center.

At the booking center, communications with Muniz were videotaped. The police had not yet read Miranda warnings to Muniz. The officer asked Muniz several biographical questions—“name, address, height, weight, eye color, date of birth, and current age.” “Muniz “stumbl[ed] over his address and age.” At this point,

The officer then asked Muniz, “Do you know what the date was of your sixth birthday?” After Muniz offered an inaudible reply, the officer repeated, “When you turned six years old, do you remember what the date was?” Muniz responded, “No, I don't.”

— 496 US at 586.

The officer directed him to complete the sobriety tests again, and Muniz again did not perform well. Muniz declined to take a breathalyzer test. While asking questions about the test, he made some statements about being under the influence of alcohol. Then the police read Miranda warnings to Muniz, and he waived his rights. He then “admitted in response to further questioning that he had been driving while intoxicated.”

At a bench trial, “Muniz was convicted of driving under the influence of alcohol.”

Muniz argued that he should receive a new trial because “the testimony relating to the field sobriety tests and the videotape taken at the booking center” should not have been allowed at his trial, as they were incriminating and occurred before Miranda warnings were read to him.

The case reached the U.S. Supreme Court after the trial court ruled against Muniz, the Superior Court of Pennsylvania reversed the trial court decision and ordered a new trial, and the Pennsylvania Supreme Court declined to hear the case.

At issue in this case is whether the statements from Muniz were properly admissible at his trial.

== Main holdings ==
1. Muniz’s slurred speech in response to the officer’s questions is physical evidence and is nontestimonial.
2. Muniz’s response to the sixth-birthday question is not admissible. His response is covered by the Self-Incrimination Clause because the incriminating inference it gives rise to—that Muniz was confused—is testimonial.
3. The responses to the biographical questions that the officer asked Muniz before reciting Miranda warnings are “admissible because the questions fall within a “routine booking question” exception” to Miranda. (These were questions “regarding Muniz's name, address, height, weight, eye color, date of birth, and current age.)

== The Court’s opinion ==
In the majority opinion, Justice Brennan started by discussing the 5th Amendment’s Self-Incrimination Clause, which says that no one “shall be compelled in any criminal case to be a witness against himself.” This privilege against self-incrimination only protects a suspect from (a) being compelled to testify against himself or (b) being compelled to give the government “evidence of a testimonial nature.” A communication is testimonial when the communication itself conveys information.

In Part III of the opinion, Justice Brennan evaluated three main issues: whether Muniz’s slurred speech was testimonial, whether his answer to the sixth-birthday question was testimonial, and whether his responses to the biographical questions should have been excluded at trial because his Miranda rights had not been read to him.

In Part III-A, the Court addressed Muniz’s slurred speech. Citing Schmerber v. California, Justice Brennan noted the distinction the Court has drawn between “’testimonial’ and ‘real or physical evidence’ for purposes of the privilege against self-incrimination.” The privilege does not apply to compelling a suspect to hand over “real or physical evidence”; it only applies to compelling communications that are testimonial. The Court concluded that the slurring itself was not testimonial, so Muniz’s responses were still admissible even though the officer had not recited Miranda warnings at that point.

In Part III-B, the Court addressed Muniz’s response to the sixth-birthday question. The issue here was that a judge or jury “could infer from Muniz’s answer (that he did not know the proper date) that his mental state was confused.” The question the Court focused on was “whether the incriminating inference of mental confusion is drawn from a testimonial act or from physical evidence.” The Court did an overview of its past cases on testimonial evidence, and discussed the historical purpose of the privilege against self-incrimination. Quoting Doe v. United States (487 U.S. 201 (1988)), the Court explained that “[a]t its core, the privilege reflects our fierce “’unwillingness to subject those suspected of crime to the cruel trilemma of self-accusation, perjury or contempt.’” The decision in this case “flows from the concept’s core meaning.” The Court noted:

[I]t is evident that a suspect is “compelled ... to be a witness against himself” at least whenever he must face the modern-day analog of the historic trilemma—either during a criminal trial where a sworn witness faces the identical three choices, or during custodial interrogation where, as we explained in Miranda, the choices are analogous and hence raise similar concerns. Whatever else it may include, therefore, the definition of “testimonial” evidence articulated in Doe must encompass all responses to questions that, if asked of a sworn suspect during a criminal trial, could place the suspect in the “cruel trilemma.”

— 496 US at 596-97.

The Court concluded that the response to the sixth-birthday question was testimonial. Muniz “was confronted with the trilemma” when he could not “remember or calculate” the date of his sixth birthday. His only options were to incriminate himself by telling the truth (that he didn’t know the date), or to lie. Muniz’s answer to this question was testimonial, and it should not have been allowed at his trial.

In Part III-C, the Court held that Muniz’s responses to the biographical questions—“name, address, height, weight, eye color, date of birth, and current age”—were admissible because “the questions fall within a ‘routine booking question’ exception which exempts from Miranda’s coverage questions to secure the ‘biographical data necessary to complete booking or pretrial services.’”

Finally, in Part IV, the Court addressed the admissibility of Muniz’s statements during the sobriety tests and regarding the breathalyzer test. The Court concluded that both sets of statements were admissible. First, the incriminating statements during the sobriety tests “were ‘voluntary’ in the sense that they were not elicited in response to custodial interrogation.” During the sobriety tests, the officer gave Muniz instructions that “were not likely to be perceived as calling for any verbal response.” Second, Muniz’s statements regarding the breathalyzer test were admissible because they “were not prompted by an interrogation within the meaning of Miranda.” The officer only conducted “limited and focused inquiries” that were “necessarily ‘attendant to’ the legitimate police procedure.”

== Significance ==
This case’s holdings on testimonial evidence could have significance for future cases dealing with new technology.

Commentators with various opinions on the routine booking exception to Miranda have called for changes or clarifications in this area of the doctrine.
