= Illinois v. Perkins =

- Supreme Court of the United States

Argued February 20, 1990 Decided June 4, 1990
- Full case name: Illinois v. Perkins
- Docket no.: 88-1972
- Citations: 496 U.S. 292 (more)
- Argument: Oral argument

Case history
- Prior: motion to suppress granted April 1987, affirmed, People v. Perkins, 531 NE 2d 141 (1988), cert. granted, 493 U. S. 808 (1989)
- Subsequent: motion to suppress granted on other grounds, 207 Ill.App.3d 1124, affirmed, People v. Perkins, 618 NE 2d 1275 (1993), rehearing denied September 1993, ibid.

Holding
- Statements made by an incarcerated suspect to an undercover police agent are admissible as evidence, notwithstanding that the suspect was not given a Miranda warning, when the suspect did not know they were speaking to the police.

Court membership
- Chief Justice William Rehnquist Associate Justices William J. Brennan Jr. · Byron White; Thurgood Marshall · Harry Blackmun; John P. Stevens · Sandra Day O'Connor; Antonin Scalia · Anthony Kennedy

Case opinions
- Majority: Kennedy, joined by Rehnquist, White, Blackmun, Stevens, O'Connor, Scalia
- Concurrence: Brennan
- Dissent: Marshall

Laws applied
- U.S. Const. amend. V

Illinois v. Perkins, 496 U.S. 292 (1990), was a decision by the United States Supreme Court that held that undercover police agents did not need to give Miranda warnings when talking to suspects in jail. Miranda warnings, named after the 1966 Supreme Court case Miranda v. Arizona, are generally required when police interrogate suspects in custody in order to protect the right not to self-incriminate and the right to counsel under the Fifth and Sixth Amendments. However, the Court ruled that potential coercion must be evaluated from the suspect's point of view, and if they are unaware that they are speaking to police, they are not under the coercive pressure of a normal interrogation.

== Background ==
Lloyd Perkins became a suspect in a murder investigation being conducted by Illinois police when they received a tip from an inmate named Donald Charlton. In March 1986, Charlton and Perkins were inmates together at Graham Correctional Center near Hillsboro, Illinois, and Charlton reported to police that he'd heard Perkins talk about killing someone. The details that Charlton shared were enough to make the tip credible, and it linked Perkins to the 1984 murder of Richard Stephenson in a suburb of East St. Louis, Illinois.

By the time police got the tip, Perkins had been released, but they tracked him to a jail in Montgomery County, Illinois, where he was being held on an unrelated charge. On March 31, police placed Charlton and an undercover police agent (John Parisi) in the jail with Perkins, both posing as escapees from a work release program. They starting talking to Perkins about escaping from the jail, and then steered the conversation to whether Perkins had ever killed anyone. Perkins then talked about killing someone in East St. Louis, and when prompted for more information, he gave extensive incriminating details. Since he was working undercover, Parisi did not identify himself as a police officer or give Perkins a Miranda warning.

== History in lower courts ==
=== Trial court ===
Perkins was charged with murder the same day that he spoke with Parisi and Charlton, had an arrest warrant issued against him the next day, and was indicted for murder by a grand jury in June 1986. In February 1987, in the circuit court in St. Claire County (the trial court), Perkins made a pretrial motion to suppress, arguing that his statements to Parisi were inadmissible as evidence because he had been subjected to a "custodial questioning" without a Miranda warning. The motion was granted in April 1987, and the state appealed.

=== Illinois appellate court ===
In a 1988 decision written by Justice Moses Harrison, a three-judge panel (also including Justices Calvo and Welch) of the 5th District Illinois Appellate Court affirmed the trial court's decision. The state argued that Miranda's requirements should not apply, because "Parisi and Charlton merely engaged the defendant in friendly conversation," and Perkins made his statements "freely, voluntarily, and without compulsion." The Court, however, observed that Miranda applied even when a suspect was in custody on unrelated charges, and it applied to indirect questioning and subterfuge. It also noted decisions by state supreme courts in Nevada (i.e. Holyfield v. State), Nebraska (i.e. State v. Fuller), and Rhode Island (i.e. State v. Travis) where the in-jail use of undercover agents and informants was subjected to Miranda requirements. The state appealed to the US Supreme Court, and certiorari was granted in 1989.

== Decision by the Supreme Court ==
In an 8-1 vote, the Supreme Court reversed the lower courts' decision.

=== Majority Opinion ===
The majority opinion, written by Justice Kennedy, focused on a suspect's subjective understanding of their situation, and how that point of view affected the coercive pressure they may feel:

Questioning by captors, who appear to control the suspect's fate, may create mutually reinforcing pressures that the Court has assumed will weaken the suspect's will, but where a suspect does not know that he is conversing with a government agent, these pressures do not exist. The state court here mistakenly assumed that because the suspect was in custody, no undercover questioning could take place. When the suspect has no reason to think that the listeners have official power over him, it should not be assumed that his words are motivated by the reaction he expects from his listeners.

— Illinois v. Perkins, 496 US at 297 (1990) (Justice Kennedy, writing for the majority)

Kennedy also noted that undercover investigation and voluntary confessions were an important part of police work. Without diminishing the important role of Miranda in assuring the fairness of the justice system, "Miranda was not meant to protect suspects from boasting about their criminal activities in front of persons whom they believe to be their cellmates."

=== Justice Brennan's concurrence ===
Justice Brennan concurred in the judgment, agreeing with how the majority applied the legal principles of Miranda v. Arizona to the case at hand. However, he believed that the undercover tactics used to get a confession from Perkins were nevertheless unconstitutional as a violation of the Due Process clause of the Fifth Amendment:

The method used to elicit the confession in this case deserves close scrutiny . . . We have recognized that "the mere fact of custody imposes pressures on the accused; confinement may bring into play subtle influences that will make him particularly susceptible to the ploys of undercover Government agents." United States v. Henry, 447 U. S. 264, 274 (1980). As Justice Marshall points out, the pressures of custody make a suspect more likely to confide in others and to engage in "jailhouse bravado." The State is in a unique position to exploit this vulnerability because it has virtually complete control over the suspect's environment. Thus, the State can ensure that a suspect is barraged with questions from an undercover agent until the suspect confesses.

— Illinois v. Perkins, 496 US at 302 (1990) (Justice Brennan, concurring in the judgment)

=== Justice Marshall's dissent ===
Justice Marshall dissented, as he disagreed with the majority's assessment that Perkins' situation lacked the coercive pressure of a normal police interrogation:

Custody works to the State's advantage in obtaining incriminating information. The psychological pressures inherent in confinement increase the suspect's anxiety, making him likely to seek relief by talking with others. . . Similarly, where the suspect is incarcerated, the constant threat of physical danger peculiar to the prison environment may make him demonstrate his toughness to other inmates by recounting or inventing past violent acts.

— Illinois v. Perkins, 496 US at 307 (1990) (Justice Marshall, dissenting)

Marshall also worried that police departments would see this ruling as a way to circumvent the protections that Miranda gave to suspects.
