= American Trucking Ass'ns v. Scheiner =

American Trucking Associations, Inc. v. Scheiner
- Supreme Court of the United States

Decided June 23, 1987
- Full case name: American Trucking Ass'ns v. Scheiner
- Citations: 483 U.S. 266 (more)

Holding
- A state tax on using motor vehicles on the highway is unconstitutional when the amount of the tax is not calculated to be proportional to highway use and when the tax treats in-state and out-of-state road users differently.

Court membership
- Chief Justice William Rehnquist Associate Justices William J. Brennan Jr. · Byron White; Thurgood Marshall · Harry Blackmun; Lewis F. Powell Jr. · John P. Stevens; Sandra Day O'Connor · Antonin Scalia

Case opinions
- Majority: Stevens
- Dissent: O'Connor, joined by Rehnquist, Powell
- Dissent: Scalia, joined by Rehnquist

Laws applied
- Commerce Clause, Dormant Commerce Clause

American Trucking Associations, Inc. v. Scheiner, 483 U.S. 266 (1987), was a United States Supreme Court case in which the Court held that a state tax on using motor vehicles on the highway is unconstitutional when the amount of the tax is not calculated to be proportional to highway use and when the tax treats in-state and out-of-state road users differently.

== Aftermath ==
The Supreme Court remanded the case to the Arkansas Supreme Court. While the case remained pending, the state of Arkansas began holding the collected taxes in escrow on the order of Circuit Justice Harry Blackmun. The Arkansas Supreme Court then reconsidered the tax in light of Scheiner and ruled it unconstitutional. However, the court declined to order refunds for taxes paid before the August escrow order, saying Scheiner could not be applied retroactively. The court nevertheless determined that the tax money paid into escrow after the August order should be refunded. In American Trucking Associations, Inc. v. Smith, the Supreme Court allowed that decision to stand.
