= National Guard Memorial Museum =

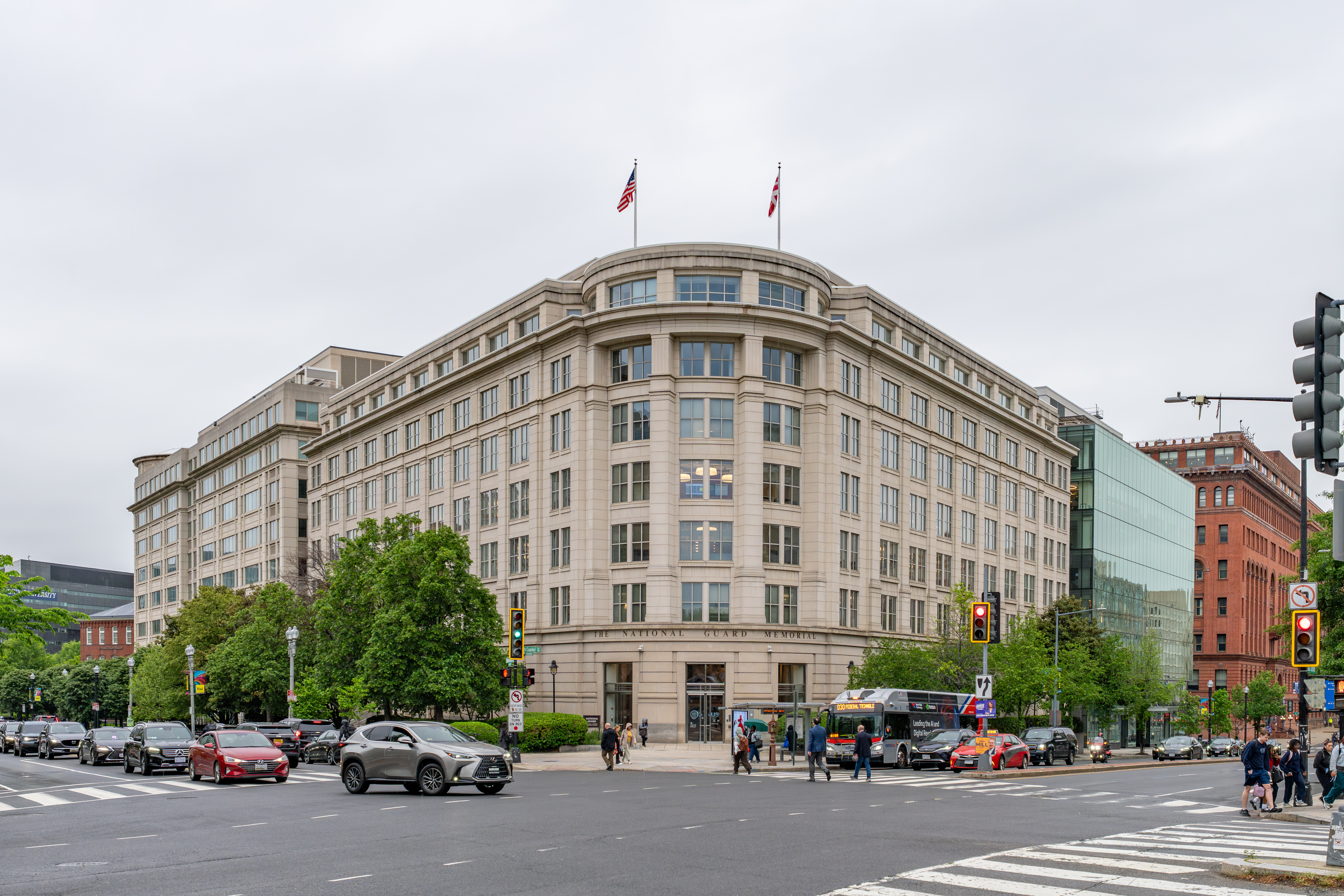
- (2026)

- Location within Washington, D.C.
- Location: National Guard Memorial Building; Washington, DC
- Coordinates: 38.898064°N 77.009579°W
- Type: Military museum
- Collection size: 5600 square feet
- Public transit access: at Union Station
- Website: www.ngef.org/Museum

The National Guard Memorial Museum is a military museum hosted by the National Guard Educational Foundation. It is located in northwestern Washington, DC, near the National Postal Museum, Union Station and Georgetown University Law Center. Covering 5600 square feet, the museum features six different thematic galleries all relating to the National Guard of the United States:

- Militia Era
- The National Guard Comes of Age
- The Citizen Soldier in World War II
- Cold War Era
- National Guard in the Modern Era
- Closing Sequence

The museum is a member of the United States Army Museum System.

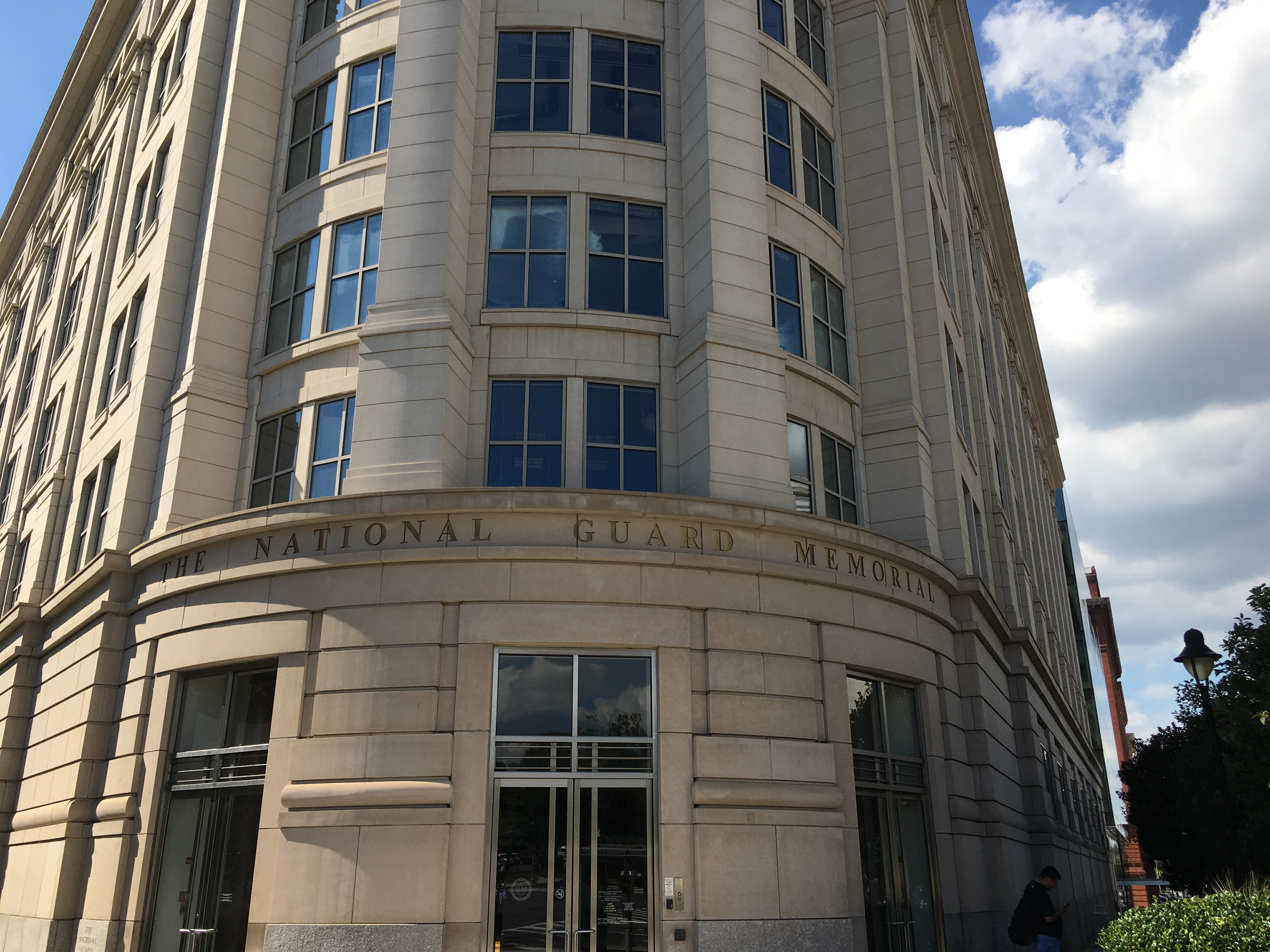
National Guard Memorial Museum font entrance
