= List of United States Supreme Court cases, volume 496 =

This is a list of all United States Supreme Court cases from volume 496 of the United States Reports:

Case name	Citation	Date decided
Keller v. State Bar of Cal.	496 U.S. 1	1990
The State Bar's use of petitioners' compulsory dues to finance political and ideological activities with which petitioners disagree violates their First Amendment right of free speech when such expenditures are not necessarily or reasonably incurred for the purpose of regulating the legal profession or improving the quality of legal services.
McKesson Corp. v. Division of Alcoholic Beverages and Tobacco, Fla. Dept. of Business Regulation	496 U.S. 18	1990
1. The Eleventh Amendment -- which provides in part that the federal does not preclude the Supreme Court's exercise of appellate jurisdiction over cases brought against States that arise from state courts.; 2. If a State penalizes taxpayers for failure to remit their taxes in a timely fashion, thus requiring them to pay first and obtain review of the tax's validity later in a refund action, the Due Process Clause of the Fourteenth Amendment requires the State to afford them meaningful postpayment relief for taxes already paid pursuant to a tax scheme ultimately found unconstitutional.
Begier v. IRS	496 U.S. 53	1990
English v. General Elec. Co.	496 U.S. 72	1990
Peel v. Attorney Registration and Disciplinary Comm'n of Ill.	496 U.S. 91	1990
Horton v. California	496 U.S. 128	1990
Commissioner, INS v. Jean	496 U.S. 154	1990
A second "substantial justification" finding is not required before EAJA fees are awarded for fee litigation itself.
American Trucking Assns., Inc. v. Smith	496 U.S. 167	1990
Board of Ed. of Westside Community Schools (Dist. 66) v. Mergens	496 U.S. 226	1990
Illinois v. Perkins	496 U.S. 292	1990
United States v. Eichman	496 U.S. 310	1990
Alabama v. White	496 U.S. 325	1990
Perpich v. Department of Defense	496 U.S. 334	1990
Howlett v. Rose	496 U.S. 356	1990
A state law "sovereign immunity" defense is not available to a school board in a § 1983 action brought in a state court that otherwise has jurisdiction when such defense would not be available if the action were brought in a federal forum.
Cooter & Gell v. Hartmarx Corp.	496 U.S. 384	1990
A voluntary Rule 41(a)(1)(i) dismissal does not deprive a district court of jurisdiction over a Rule 11 motion.
Office of Personnel Management v. Richmond	496 U.S. 414	1990
Payments of money from the Federal Treasury are limited to those authorized by statute, and erroneous advice given by a Government employee to a benefit claimant cannot estop the Government from denying benefits not otherwise permitted by law.
Michigan Dept. of State Police v. Sitz	496 U.S. 444	1990
Sullivan v. Stroop	496 U.S. 478	1990
Title II "child's insurance benefits" do not constitute "child support" within the meaning of § 602(a)(8)(A)(vi).
Wilder v. Virginia Hospital Assn.	496 U.S. 498	1990
General Motors Corp. v. United States	496 U.S. 530	1990
EPA is not required to act on a proposed SIP revision within four months, because that time limit applies only to original SIPs.
Texaco Inc. v. Hasbrouck	496 U.S. 543	1990
Pennsylvania v. Muniz	496 U.S. 582	1990
Sullivan v. Finkelstein	496 U.S. 617	1990
The Secretary of Health and Human Services may immediately appeal a district court order effectively invalidating regulations limiting the kinds of inquiries that must be made to determine entitlement to disability insurance benefits and remanding a claim to the Secretary for consideration without those restrictions.
Pension Benefit Guaranty Corporation v. LTV Corp.	496 U.S. 633	1990
Eli Lilly & Co. v. Medtronic, Inc.	496 U.S. 661	1990
