= One weekend a month, two weeks a year =

Slogan used by the US Army

"One weekend a month, two weeks a year" is a former recruiting slogan used by the U.S. Army National Guard. It indicated the amount of time an individual would need to spend actively in the Guard to be a Guardsman with benefits. Though never officially, it was also informally used by Air National Guard, U.S. Army Reserve, U.S. Naval Reserve, U.S. Marine Corps Reserve, U.S. Air Force Reserve and U.S. Coast Guard Reserve personnel in describing their similar military time commitment.

It was dropped during the Iraq War after it became clear that National Guardsmen and Reservists were now serving considerably more time in service, especially on active military duty on extended overseas deployments in the Southwest Asia combat zone.

== Usage of the slogan ==
The slogan "one weekend a month, two weeks a year" has been most commonly seen by Americans in recruiting ads for the National Guard, especially in the 1970s, 1980s and 1990s. Although the slogan is only sometimes used directly in advertising, as of 2004 it was used to describe the duties of at least some military posts.

The slogan has also been used to contrast the commitment that a National Guard member would give during those times when his country was not at war.

Other Reserve and National Guard forces have used this slogan as something against which they can contrast their own dedication, showing that, as members of combat aviation units or special forces, they are not mere "weekend warriors".

== Understanding among the enlisted ==
Understanding the meaning of the slogan to those enlisted in the National Guard requires understanding the historical context in which it was given. During World War II, the National Guard was called up to defend their country, and this was repeated in the Korean War even when American soil was not directly threatened. At this time, joining a reserve component could clearly be seen as a route to service overseas. However, at the time of the Vietnam War, President Johnson made it clear that the National Guard's role was to defend the country and not to be involved in overseas adventures. At the time, this meant that those who joined the force could be fairly sure of not seeing action in the war, and became a pejorative term.

As a result, the term "weekend warriors" was coined by members of the United States Armed Forces and the general public, as the National Guard service was seen as cushy and easy compared to those in active duty. This perception was reinforced by the abysmal performances from the National Guard in notable events such as the 1967 Detroit riot and the 1970 Kent State shootings, where the guardsmen were criticized for inadequate riot training and lack of combat experience that resulted in casualties/damages far exceeding their intended goals.

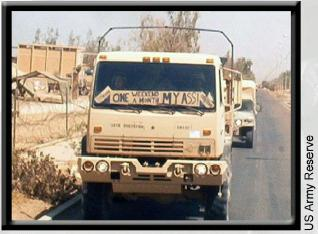
"One Weekend a Month, My Ass!!" sign posted on an Army Reserve vehicle in Iraq.

These forces are expected to act as a second line of defense, primarily motivated by the fact that they are defending their own homes and families.

The commitment to Iraq and more recently, subsequent engagements, conflicts, and operations (primarily, and more specifically; those related to the Global War on Terrorism) has meant that many members of the National Guard feel the terms in which they understood their recruitment have been breached. The slogan has now become known in a changed form, "One weekend a month, my ass", as a comment on the perceived mistreatment of the National Guard and the Reserve.

== Real service requirements contrasted to expectations ==
During some periods of the 2003 war in Iraq, the National Guard (Army National Guard and Air National Guard) represented 41% of all U.S. military personnel deployed. The majority are supposed to serve for six months or a year. However, some specialists in the reserve forces have been required to serve for up to two years.

In the meantime, the role of the National Guard which, in the Vietnam War, largely revolved around home defense and policing, has changed so that in Iraq "about 20 percent of the U.S. military deaths in that conflict" have been carried by Reserve and Guard units.

It has been claimed in the U.S. media that the change in expectations on the National Guard is a deliberate change in policy by military planners in response to the Vietnam War. The need to use the National Guard is designed to reduce the possibility of "half-hearted" wars in future. Actual legal changes were made by the US Congress and in the 1980s which moved final decision for their use as military forces from their commanders in chief, the state governors, to the federal government. These new laws were successfully defended against challenges from state governors in the U.S. Supreme Court.

== Army's future annual drill plans ==
In July 2012, the Chief of Staff of the Army, General Ray Odierno, indicated that he intended to change the Army National Guard's annual peacetime active duty commitment from two weeks per year to up to seven weeks per year, in addition to the weekend a month, which would not change. The changes come as the Army plans to reduce the number of full-time soldiers, and going forward relies increasingly on the Army National Guard. "How do we sustain the readiness and experience that we've gained in the National Guard and Reserve component?" Odierno asked. "That's what we've been working on."

== Other usages ==
"One weekend a month, two weeks a year" was also formerly used as a descriptor in television advertisements for the Australian Army Reserve.
