= Views on the 2003 invasion of Iraq =

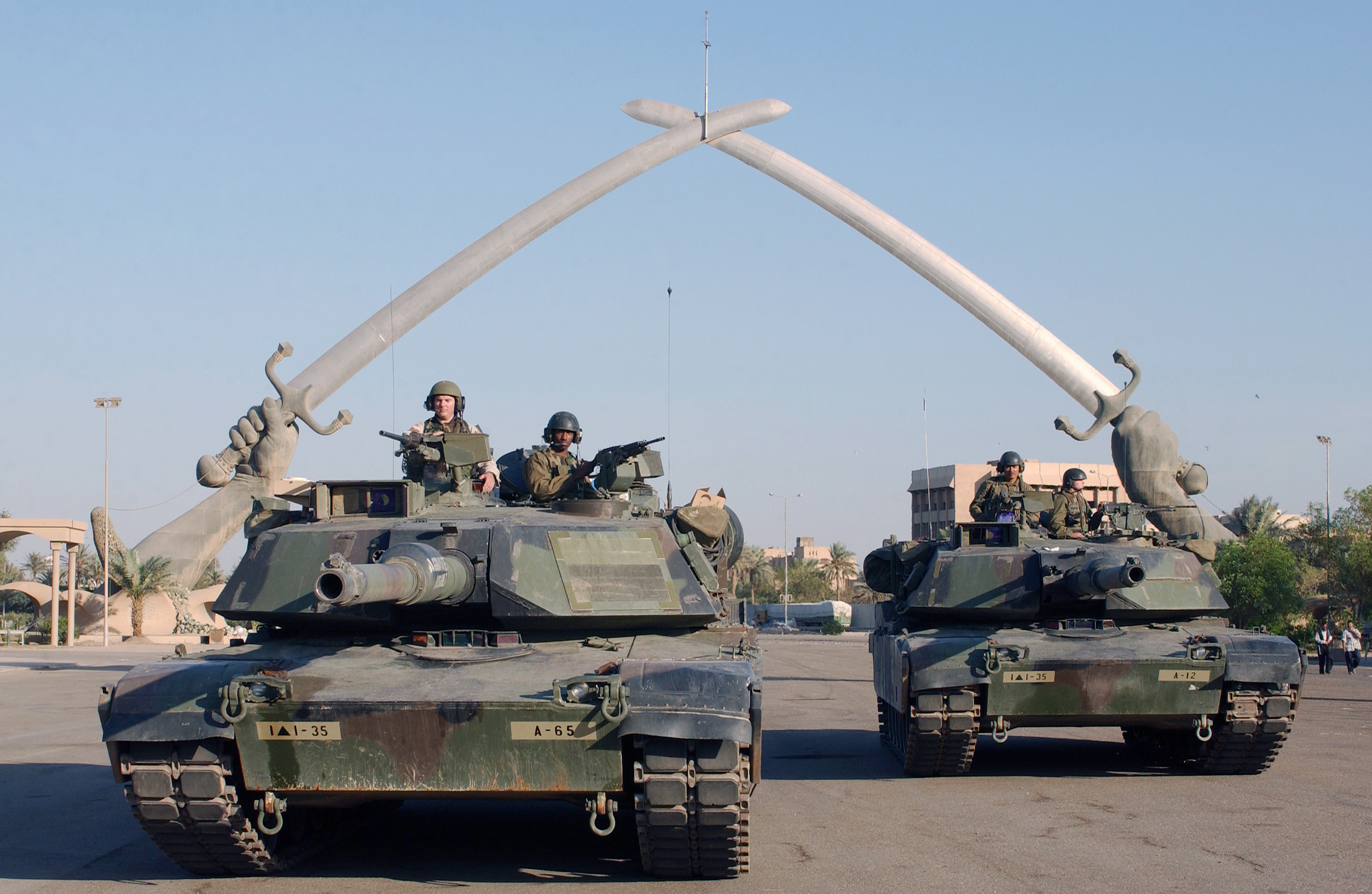
M1A1 Abrams pose for a photo under the "Hands of Victory" in Ceremony Square, Baghdad, Iraq.

The events surrounding the 2003 invasion of Iraq have led to numerous expressions of opinion with respect to the war. This article contains links to several topics relating to views on the invasion, and the subsequent occupation of Iraq.

American views

- Public opinion in the United States on the invasion of Iraq: Opinion poll views and history.

World views

- International reactions to the prelude to the Iraq War: Summary of various governments' pre-war positions.
- United Nations Security Council and the Iraq War: Examines positions of UN Security Council members over the period 2002–2003

Opposition views

- Opposition to the Iraq War: Various opinions of people against the Iraq War.
- Protests against the Iraq War: Protests against Iraq war across the world.
- Criticism of the Iraq War: Various criticisms of the Iraq War.

Other views

- Media coverage of the Iraq War: Various communication campaigns identified that inform (or influence) the public.
- Legitimacy of the 2003 invasion of Iraq
- Legality of the Iraq War
- Iraq Inquiry or Chilcot Inquiry: a British public inquiry into its role in the war.
