= Opposition to the Iraq War =

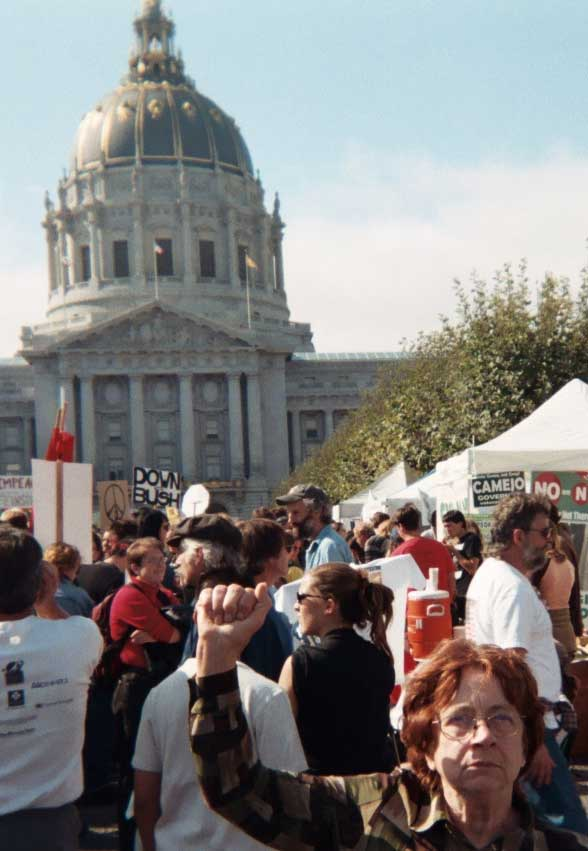
A woman in San Francisco raises her fist, as people in over 60 countries took to the streets on February 15, 2003, in opposition to the imminent invasion of Iraq.

Opposition to the Iraq War significantly occurred worldwide, both before and during the initial 2003 invasion of Iraq by a United States–led coalition, and throughout the subsequent occupation. Individuals and groups opposing the war include the governments of many nations which did not take part in the invasion, including both its land neighbors Canada and Mexico, its NATO allies in Europe such as France and Germany, as well as China and Indonesia in Asia, and significant sections of the populace in those that took part in the invasion. Opposition to the war was also widespread domestically.

Rationales for opposition include the belief that the war is illegal according to the United Nations Charter, or would contribute to instability both within Iraq and the wider Middle East. Critics have also questioned the validity of the war's stated objectives, such as a supposed link between the country's Ba'athist government and the September 11 attacks on the United States, and its possession of weapons of mass destruction "certified" by the Niger uranium forgeries. The latter was claimed by the United States during the run-up to the war, but no such weapons were ever found.

Within the United States, popular opinion on the war has varied significantly with time. Although there was significant opposition to the idea in the months preceding the attack, polls taken during the invasion showed that a majority of US citizens supported their government's action. However, public opinion had shifted by 2004 to a majority believing that the invasion was a mistake, and has remained so since then. There has also been significant criticism of the war from US politicians such as Bernie Sanders, national security and military personnel, including generals such as Anthony Zinni and Paul Eaton who served in the war and have since spoken out against its handling, including calling for former Secretary of Defense's Donald Rumsfeld resignation. Lieutenant General Gregory S. Newbold, openly critical of Rumsfeld's plans for the invasion of Iraq, resigned in protest prior to the invasion.

Worldwide, the war and occupation have been officially condemned by 54 countries and the heads of many major religions. Popular anti-war feeling is strong in these and other countries, including the US' allies in the conflict, and many have experienced huge protests totalling millions of participants.

== Early opposition ==
The opposition to the war manifested itself most visibly in a series of worldwide protests against the Iraq War during February 2003, just before the invasion of Iraq starting on March 20, 2003. Noam Chomsky said:

Poll results available from Gallup International, as well as local sources for most of Europe, West and East, showed that support for a war carried out "unilaterally by America and its allies" did not rise above 11 percent in any country. Support for a war if mandated by the UN ranged from 13 percent (Spain) to 51 percent (Netherlands).

== Reasons for opposition ==
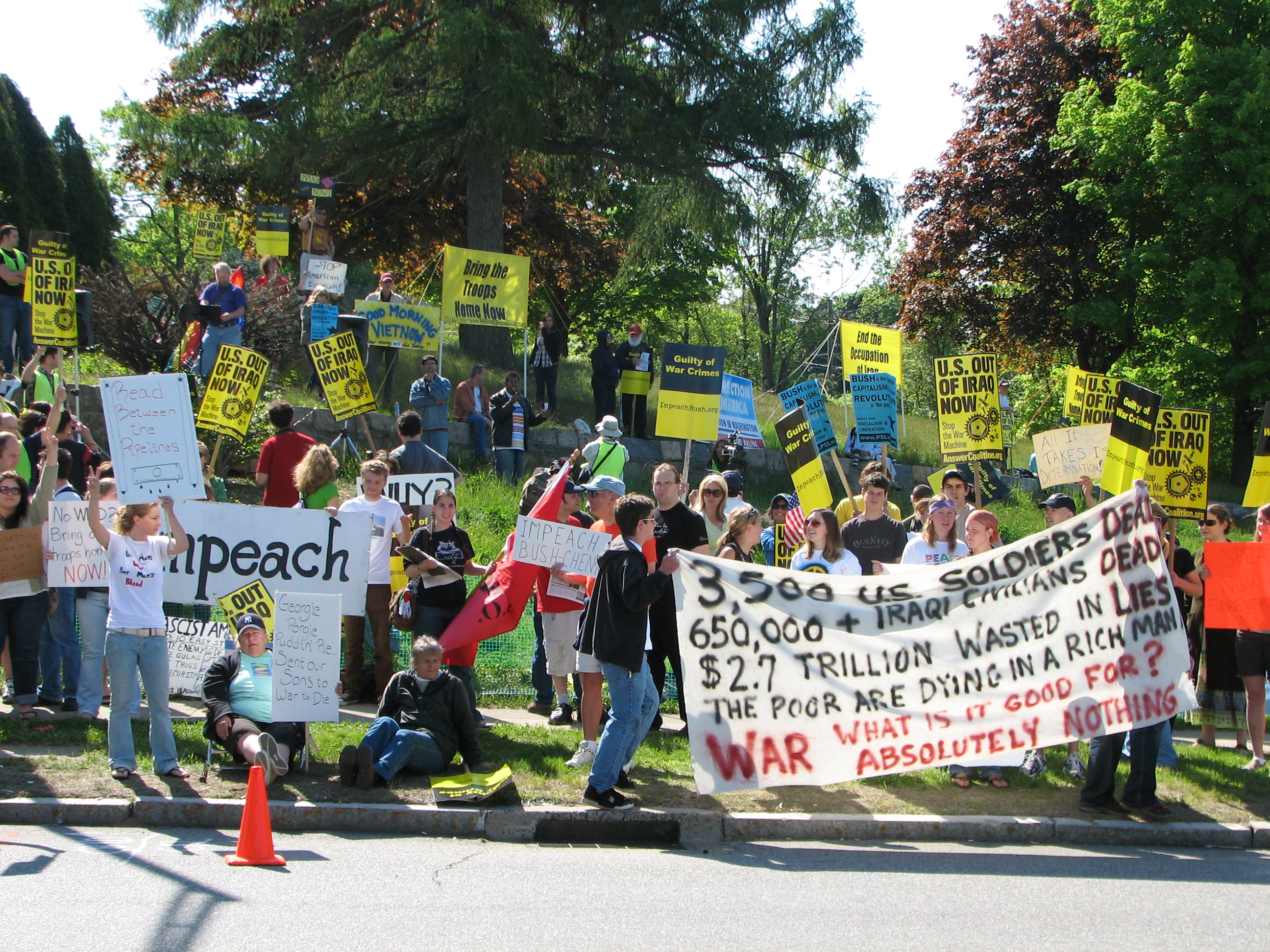
Protest against the Iraq War in New London, Connecticut on May 23, 2007

Critics of the invasion claimed that it would lead collateral damage to deaths of thousands of Iraqi civilians and soldiers as well as Coalition soldiers, and that it would moreover damage peace and stability throughout the region and the world.

Another oft-stated reason for opposition is the Westphalian concept that foreign governments should never possess a right to intervene in another sovereign nation's internal affairs (including terrorism or any other non-international affair). Giorgio Agamben, the Italian philosopher, has also offered a critique of the logic of preemptive war.

Others did accept a limited right for military intervention in foreign countries, but nevertheless opposed the invasion on the basis that it was conducted without United Nations' approval and was hence a violation of international law. According to this position, adherence by the United States and the other great powers to the UN Charter and to other international treaties is a legal obligation; exercising military power in violation of the UN Charter undermines the rule of law and is illegal vigilantism on an international scale.

There was also skepticism of U.S. claims that Iraq's secular government had any links to Al-Qaeda, the Islamic fundamentalist terrorist group considered responsible for the September 11 attacks on the World Trade Center and Pentagon.

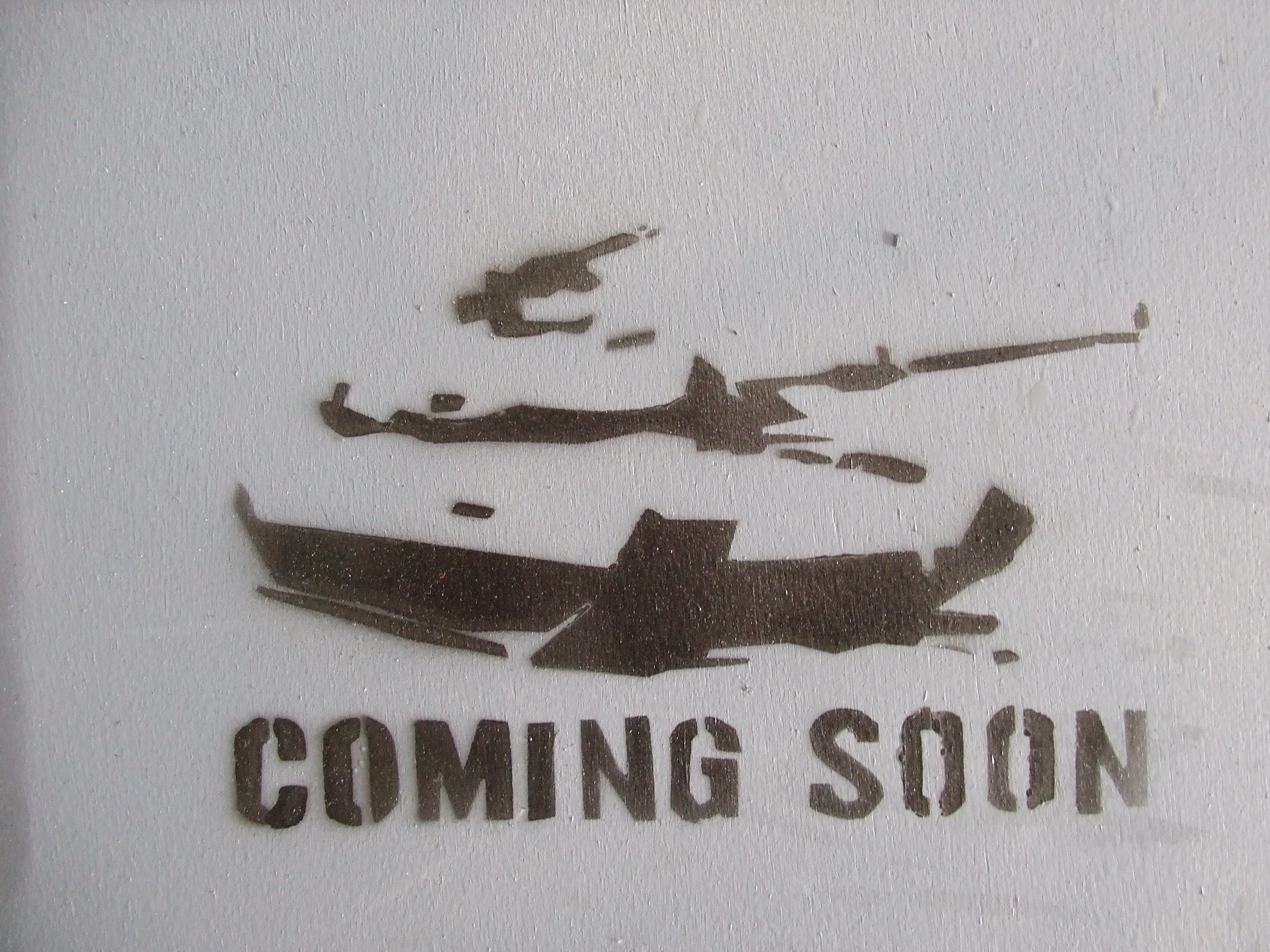
Anti-war stencil graffiti in Toronto

Some expressed puzzlement that the United States would consider military action against Iraq and not against North Korea, which claimed it already had nuclear weapons and had announced that it was willing to contemplate war with the United States. This criticism intensified when North Korea reportedly conducted a nuclear weapons test on October 9, 2006.

There was also criticism of Coalition policy by those who did not believe that military actions would help to fight terror, with some believing that it would actually help Al-Qaeda's recruitment efforts; others believed that the war and immediate post-war period would lead to a greatly increased risk that weapons of mass destruction would fall into the wrong hands (including Al-Qaeda).

Both inside and outside of the U.S., some argued that the Bush Administration's rationale for war was to gain control over Iraqi natural resources (primarily petroleum). These critics felt that the war would not help to reduce the threat of WMD proliferation, and that the real reason for the war was to secure control over the Iraqi oil fields at a time when US links with Saudi Arabia were seen to be at risk. "No blood for oil" was a popular protest cry prior to the invasion in March 2003. Administration officials denied these charges, and scholar Jeff Colgan writes that "there is still no consensus on the degree to which oil played a role" in the Iraq War.

Some opponents of the war also believed that there would be no weapons of mass destruction in Iraq, and thus there was little reason for an invasion. Prominent among these was Scott Ritter, a former U.S. military intelligence officer and then a United Nations weapons inspector in Iraq, and who in 1998 had been hawkish enough toward Iraq as to be admonished by U.S. senator Joe Biden, "The decision of whether or not the country should go to war is slightly above your pay grade." Investigations after the invasion failed to produce evidence of WMDs in Iraq (apart from a very small number of degraded chemical weapons shells located after the Iran–Iraq War ended in 1988). Generally, however, very few opponents of the Iraq invasion publicly expressed doubt as to whether the Saddam Hussein regime possessed weapons of mass destruction.

During the occupation, some opponents accused President Bush of being indifferent to the suffering caused by the invasion. In 2006 for example he opined that when the history of Iraq is written the period would "look like just a comma", prompting criticism that he took the more than 2,700 US troop deaths lightly.

== Opposition in the United States ==
=== Popular opposition ===
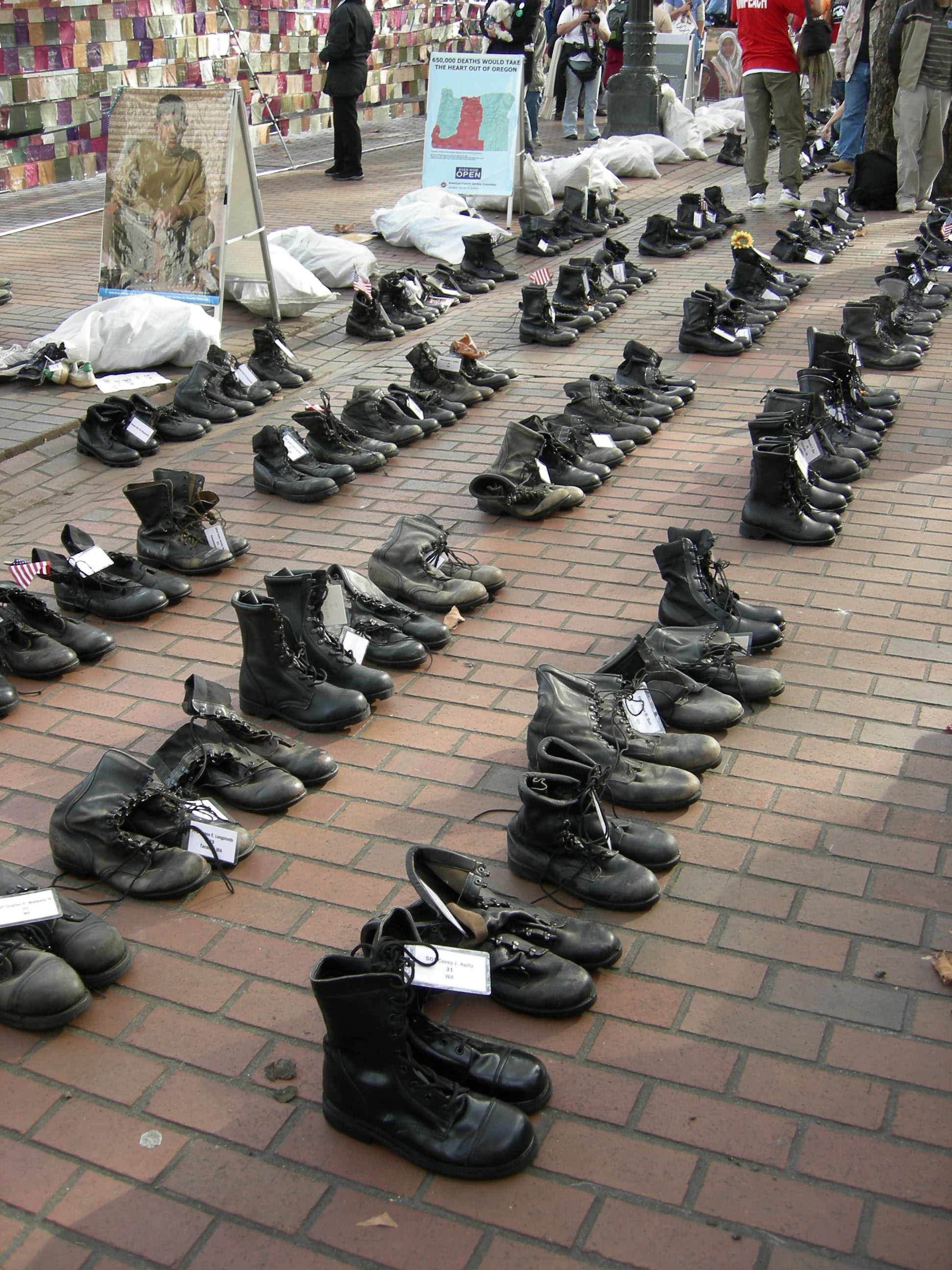
Combat boots arrayed in memory of the U.S. military war dead as part of an anti-war demonstration (Seattle, 2007).

The Iraq War was met with considerable popular opposition in the United States, beginning during the planning stages and continuing through the invasion subsequent occupation of Iraq. The months leading up to the war saw protests across the United States, the largest of which, held on February 15, 2003 involved about 300,000 to 400,000 protesters in New York City, with smaller numbers protesting in Seattle, San Francisco, Chicago, and other cities.

Consistent with the anti-war sentiment of the protests, in the months leading up to the Iraq War, American public opinion heavily favored a diplomatic solution over immediate military intervention. A January 2003 CBS News/New York Times poll found that 63% of Americans wanted President Bush to find a diplomatic solution to the Iraq situation, compared with 31% who favored immediate military intervention. That poll also found, however, that if diplomacy failed, support for military action to remove Saddam Hussein was above 60 percent.

Days before the March 20 invasion, a USA Today/CNN/Gallup Poll found support for the war was related to UN approval. Nearly six in 10 said they were ready for such an invasion "in the next week or two." But that support dropped off if the U.N. backing was not first obtained. If the U.N. Security Council were to reject a resolution paving the way for military action, only 54% of Americans favored a U.S. invasion. And if the Bush administration did not seek a final Security Council vote, support for a war dropped to 47%.

Immediately after the 2003 invasion most polls within the United States showed a substantial majority of Americans supporting war. In a March 2003 Gallup poll, the day after the invasion, 76% of Americans supported military action against Iraq, but that trend began to shift less than a year after the war began. Beginning in December 2004, polls have consistently shown that a majority thinks the invasion was a mistake. As of 2006, opinion on what the U.S. should do in Iraq is split, with a slight majority generally favoring setting a timetable for withdrawal, but against withdrawing immediately. However, in this area responses vary widely with the exact wording of the question.

After the invasion of Iraq, one of the most visible leaders of popular opposition in the U.S. was Cindy Sheehan, the mother of Casey Sheehan, a soldier killed in Iraq. Sheehan's role as an anti-war leader began with her camping out near President Bush's ranch in Crawford, Texas, and continued with a nationwide tour and trips to Europe and South America.

=== Opposition from national security and military personnel ===
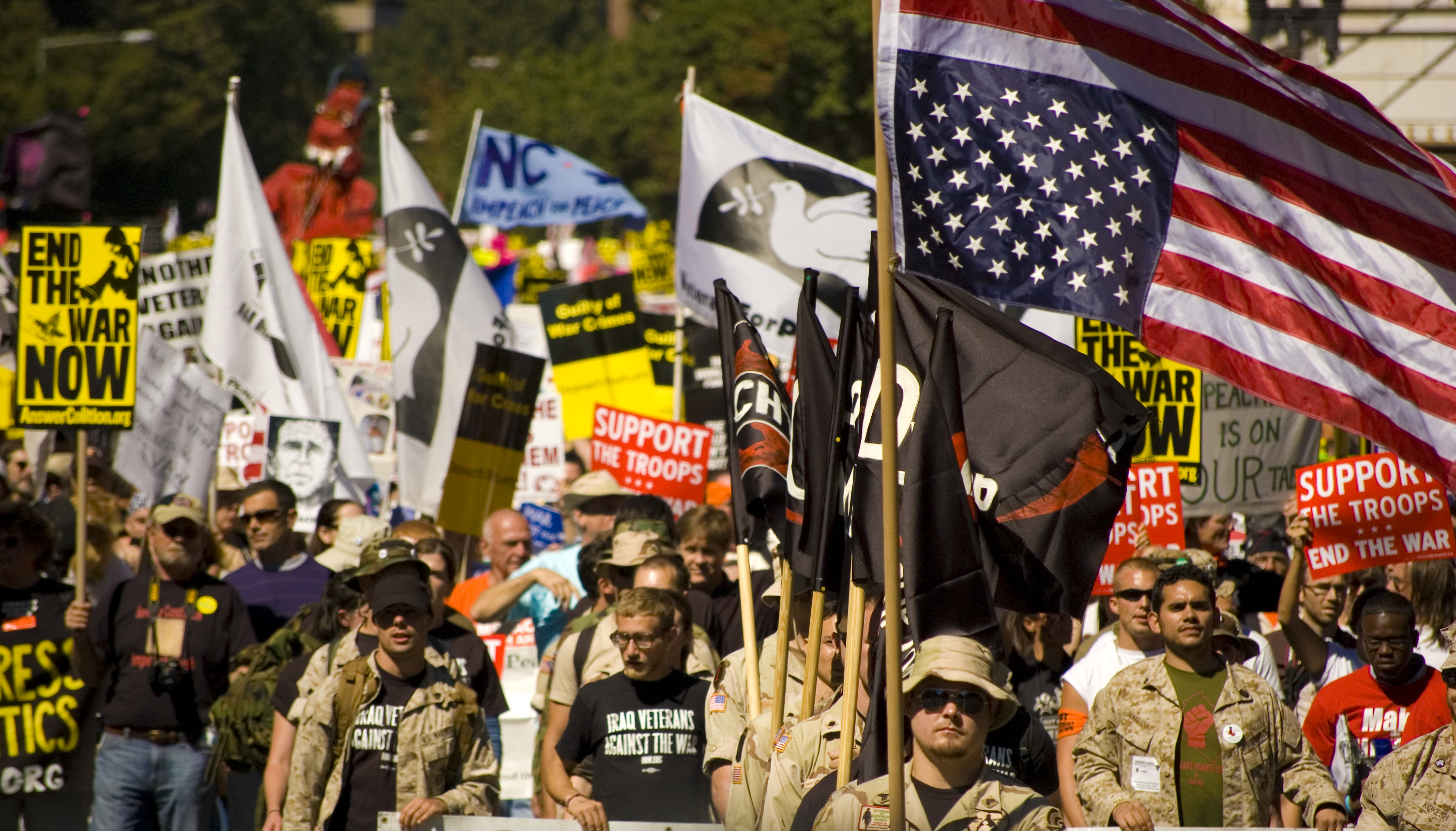
Iraq Veterans Against the War demonstrate in Washington, D.C., on September 15, 2007. The U.S. flag is displayed upside-down, which under the flag code is a distress signal.

Several prominent members of the military and national security communities, particularly those who favor a more realist approach to international relations, have been critical of both the decision to invade Iraq and the prosecution of the War.

On July 28, 2002, less than eight months before the invasion of Iraq,The Washington Post reported that "many senior U.S. military officers" including members of the Joint Chiefs of Staff opposed an invasion on the grounds that the policy of containment was working.

A few days later, Gen. Joseph P. Hoar (Ret.) warned the Senate Foreign Relations Committee that the invasion was risky and perhaps unnecessary.

Morton Halperin, a foreign policy expert with the Council on Foreign Relations and Center for American Progress warned that an invasion would increase the terrorist threat.

In a 2002 book, Scott Ritter, a Nuclear Weapons Inspector in Iraq from 1991 to 1998, argued against an invasion and expressed doubts about the Bush Administration's claims that Saddam Hussein had a WMD capability. He later accused the Bush administration of deliberately misleading the public.

I think [The Bush Administration] has stated that Iraq has weapons of mass destruction, and that's as simple as they want to keep it. They don't want to get into the nitty-gritty things such as if you bury a Scud missile to hide it from detection, there is a little thing called corrosion. Where do you hide the fuel, how do you make this stuff up, how do you align it. Because when you disassemble it, there is a process called re-alignment. There is a factory involved in that. And then you have to test launch it to make sure that the alignment works, and that's detectable, and they haven't done that. There is a lot of common sense things that go into consideration of whether or not Iraq has an operational weapons of mass destruction capability.

Brent Scowcroft, who served as National Security Adviser to President George H. W. Bush was an early critic. He wrote an August 15, 2002 editorial in The Wall Street Journal entitled "Don't attack Saddam," arguing that the war would distract from the broader fight against terrorism and the Israeli–Palestinian conflict, which should be the U.S.'s highest priority in the Middle East. The next month, Gen. Hugh Shelton, former chairman of the Joint Chiefs of Staff, agreed that war in Iraq would distract from the war on terrorism.

Retired Marine Gen. Anthony Zinni, former head of Central Command for U.S. forces in the Middle East and State Department's envoy to the Palestinian-Israeli conflict, echoed many of Scowcroft's concerns in an October 2002 speech at the Middle East Institute. In a follow-up interview with Salon, Zinni said he was "not convinced we need to do this now," arguing that deposing Saddam Hussein was only the sixth or seventh top priority in the Middle East, behind the Middle East peace process, reforming Iran, our commitments in Afghanistan, and several others.

By January 19, 2003, Time magazine reported that "as many as 1 in 3 senior officers questions the wisdom of a preemptive war with Iraq."

On February 13, 2003, Ambassador Joseph Wilson, former chargé d'affaires in Baghdad, resigned from the Foreign Service and publicly questioned the need for another war in Iraq. After the War started, he wrote an editorial in The New York Times titled What I Didn't Find in Africa that claimed to discredit a Bush Administration claim that Iraq had attempted to procure uranium from Niger.

John Brady Kiesling, another career diplomat with similar reservations, resigned in a public letter in the New York Times on February 27. He was followed on March 10 by John H. Brown, a career diplomat with 22 years of service, and on March 19 by Mary Ann Wright, a diplomat with 15 years of service in the State Department following a military career of 29 years. The war started the next day.

Prominent diplomat George Kennan, who famously advocated the policy of containment of Soviet expansion during the Cold War warned of the unforeseen consequences of waging war against Iraq, a war that "bears no relation to the first war against terrorism" and declared efforts by the Bush administration to associate Al-Qaeda with Saddam Hussein "pathetically unsupportive and unreliable". Kennan stated:

Anyone who has ever studied the history of American diplomacy, especially military diplomacy, knows that you might start in a war with certain things on your mind as a purpose of what you are doing, but in the end, you found yourself fighting for entirely different things that you had never thought of before ... In other words, war has a momentum of its own and it carries you away from all thoughtful intentions when you get into it. Today, if we went into Iraq, like the president would like us to do, you know where you begin. You never know where you are going to end.

Lt. Col. Karen Kwiatkowski (Ret.) was political/military desk officer at the Defense Department's office for Near East South Asia (NESA) in the months before the war. In December 2003 she began to write an anonymous column that described the disrupting influence of the Office of Special Plans on the analysis that led to the decision to go to war.

On June 16, 2004, twenty seven former senior U.S. diplomats and military commanders called Diplomats and Military Commanders for Change issued a statement against the war. The group included:

- William J. Crowe, Chairman of the Joint Chiefs of Staff under President Ronald Reagan
- Joseph Hoar, former Commander of U.S. forces in the Middle East
- H. Allen Holmes, former Assistant Secretary of Defense for Special Operations
- Donald McHenry, former Ambassador to the United Nations
- Merrill McPeak, former Air Force Chief of Staff
- Jack F. Matlock Jr., a member of the National Security Council under Reagan and former Ambassador to the Soviet Union
- John Reinhardt, former director of the United States Information Agency
- Ronald I. Spiers, Under Secretary General of the United Nations for Political Affairs and a former Ambassador
- Stansfield Turner, former director of the Central Intelligence Agency

Richard Clarke, former chief counter-terrorism adviser on the National Security Council for both the latter part of the Clinton Administration and early part of the George W. Bush Administration, criticized the Iraq War along similar lines in his 2004 book Against All Enemies and during his testimony before the 9/11 Commission. In addition to diverting funds from the fight against al-Qaeda, Clarke argued that the invasion of Iraq would actually bolster the efforts of Osama bin Laden and other Islamic radicals, who had long predicted that the U.S. planned to invade an oil-rich Middle Eastern country.

Similar arguments were made in a May 2004 interview and an August 2005 article by Lt. Gen. William Odom, former director of the National Security Agency.

In April 2006, six prominent retired generals publicly criticized Secretary of Defense Donald Rumsfeld's handling of the war, and called for his resignation. The group included two generals who commanded troops in Iraq: Maj. Gen. Charles H. Swannack Jr. (Ret.) and Maj. Gen. John Batiste (Ret.). One of the generals, Lieut. Gen. Greg Newbold (Ret.), who served as the Pentagon's top operations officer during the months leading up to the invasion, also published an article that month in Time Magazine entitled "Why Iraq Was a Mistake."

On September 12, 2007, two retired U.S. Army generals, Lt. Gen. Robert Gard and Brig. Gen. John Johns, joined former Sen. Gary Hart in publishing a statement calling for withdrawal from Iraq. Robert Gard is the Senior Military Fellow at the Center for Arms Control and Non-Proliferation, John Johns is on the board of directors for the Council for a Livable World, and Gary Hart is the council's chairman.

In October 2007, Lieutenant General Ricardo Sanchez, former commander of coalition forces in Iraq, called the 2007 "surge" a "flawed strategy", and suggested that the political leadership in the US would have been court martialed for their actions, had they been military personnel.

=== Opposition from soldiers ===
There have been several individual refusals to ship (e.g., Pablo Paredes, and 1st Lt. Ehren Watada) or to carry out missions (e.g. 343rd Quartermasters). Soon after the war began, 67% of surveyed US soldiers in Iraq told Stars and Stripes that the invasion was worthwhile, though half described their units' morale as "low." A Zogby poll in March 2006 found that 72% of US soldiers in Iraq said the war should be ended within a year, and a quarter said that all troops should be withdrawn immediately.

Iraq Veterans Against the War (IVAW) was formed in 2004 to help antiwar soldiers network and seek solidarity from one another. IVAW held a Winter Soldier event, from March 13 through March 16, 2008, in which U.S. veterans spoke of their experiences during the Iraq War. The Pacifica Radio network broadcast the proceedings live, and streaming audio and video of the event is also available. John Bonifaz filed a suit on behalf of 12 Congress members and various military families to try to stop the Iraq War.

Using the example of GI resistance coffee housed during the Vietnam War some Iraq War veterans have founded anti-war coffeehouses near military bases to act as resources for soldiers opposed to the Iraq War. Two examples are Under the Hood Café near Fort Hood and Coffee Strong near Joint Base Lewis–McChord.

=== Congressional opposition ===
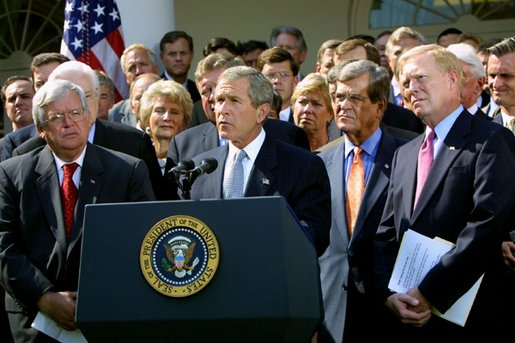
President George Bush, surrounded by leaders of the House and Senate, announces the Joint Resolution to Authorize the Use of United States Armed Forces Against Iraq, October 2, 2002.

Opinion in the U.S. Congress leading up to the Iraq War generally favored a diplomatic solution, while supporting military intervention should diplomacy fail. The October 11, 2002 resolution that authorized President Bush to use force in Iraq passed the Senate by a vote of 77 to 23, and the House by 296 to 133. Leading opponents of the resolution included Senators Russ Feingold and Edward Kennedy.

As the war progressed and the insurgency began to develop into what many believe is a civil war in Iraq, Congressional support for the Iraq campaign began to wane. A flashpoint came on November 17, 2005, when Representative John Murtha, a Vietnam combat veteran who voted to authorize the war and is widely regarded as an ardent supporter of the military, introduced a resolution calling for U.S. forces in Iraq to be "redeployed at the earliest practicable date" to stand as a quick-reaction force in U.S. bases in neighboring countries such as Kuwait.

Since the introduction of the Murtha resolution, many members of Congress, particularly in the Democratic Party, have rallied around the strategy of a phased troop withdrawal. In the 2007 Congressional session, critics of the war have sought to tie additional war appropriations to a specific timetable for withdrawal. On March 23, 2007, the House of Representatives passed an Iraq spending bill that requires that troops begin withdrawing in March 2008 and that most US forces be out of Iraq by August 31, 2008.

Congressional critics of the war have also opposed President Bush's plan to send an additional 20,000 U.S. soldiers to Iraq. On January 10, 2007, Senator Dick Durbin gave the Democratic response to this plan by saying: "We have given the Iraqis so much. ... Now, in the fourth year of this war, it is time for the Iraqis to stand and defend their own nation."

=== Opposition from presidential candidates ===
The Iraq War was the defining issue of the 2004 U.S. presidential campaign. All of the Republican candidates and most of the Democratic candidates supported the war, although most of the Democrats also criticized the war's prosecution.

John Kerry, the Democratic nominee for President in 2004, voted to authorize the invasion, and said during his campaign that he stood by his vote. He also argued during the campaign that "the way he (President Bush) went to war was a mistake."

In the 2008 U.S. presidential campaign, candidates Representatives Ron Paul and Dennis Kucinich, Senators Barack Obama, Chris Dodd and Mike Gravel were some of the most outspoken critics of the Iraq War. Ron Paul said that "The war in Iraq was sold to us with false information. The area is more dangerous now than when we entered it. We destroyed a regime hated by our direct enemies, the jihadists, and created thousands of new recruits for them. This war has cost more than 3,000 American lives, thousands of seriously wounded, and hundreds of billions of dollars." Barack Obama (who went on to win the election) was not a senator at the time of the voting of the Iraq War Resolution, but had repeatedly voiced his disapproval of it both before and during his senatorship, saying at an anti war rally in Chicago on October 2, 2002: "I am not opposed to all wars. I'm opposed to dumb wars." He also spoke of the "undetermined length ... undetermined cost, [and] undetermined consequences" which even a successful war would bring. Dodd voted in favor of the Iraq War Resolution in 2002, but Dodd has since become an opponent of the war. Dodd has said the Iraq War has been waged "for all the wrong reasons" and that it is eroding both the nation's security and its moral leadership.

=== Opposition from lawyers specializing in international law ===
Investigator of Nazi war crimes Ben Ferencz has suggested in an interview given on August 25, 2006, that not only Saddam Hussein should be tried in the International Criminal Court, but also George W. Bush because the Iraq War had been begun by the U.S. without permission by the UN Security Council. Ben Ferencz wrote the foreword for political analyst Michael Haas's book, talking about possible indictment of Bush administration over war crime charges, titled George W. Bush, War Criminal?: The Bush Administration's Liability for 269 War Crimes.

== Opposition in European countries ==
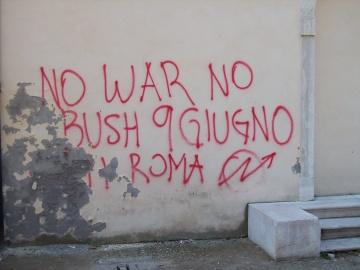
Anti-war graffiti in Venice, Italy

Around the 2003 Invasion of Iraq and subsequent occupation of Iraq, polling data indicated that opposition to military action against Iraq was widespread in Europe.

'Anti-Bush' and anti-war sentiments were reflected in many western European countries, generally with the populace less sympathetic to the U.S. stance even when the government in a given country (e.g. the United Kingdom, or Italy) aligned themselves with the U.S. position. Opinion polls showed the population was against the war, with opposition as high as 90% in Spain and Italy, and also widespread in Eastern Europe. Some suggested that the reason for the EU's negative view of the war are Europe's economic interests in the region. However, the electorates of France and Germany were strongly opposed to the war and it would have been difficult for their governments to fail to reflect these views.

Following the first UN resolution, the US and the UK pushed for a second resolution authorizing an invasion. The French and German governments, amongst others, took the position that the UN inspection process should be allowed to be completed. France's then-Foreign Minister, Dominique de Villepin received loud applause for his speech against the Iraq War at the United Nations on February 14, 2003. Neither of these countries have sent troops to Iraq. However, despite popular opinion in their countries, the governments of Italy and Spain supported the war politically and militarily, although Spain ceased to do so after the election of a Socialist government in 2004.

In the United Kingdom, both the governing Labour Party and the official opposition Conservative Party were in favour of the invasion. The Liberal Democrats insisted on a U.N. resolution; they opposed the war as a result. Outside parliament, anti-war sentiment was more widespread: the February 15, 2003 protest in London attracted between 750,000 and 2,000,000 supporters from various walks of life. Prominent politicians and other individuals expressing anti-war views included: Tory MP Kenneth Clarke, Charles Kennedy, Menzies Campbell, Tony Benn, George Galloway, future Labour party leader Jeremy Corbyn, Chris Martin, Damon Albarn, Ms. Dynamite, and Bianca Jagger.

Two prominent Labour politicians resigned from their positions in opposition to the war. Leader of the House of Commons Robin Cook resigned from the Cabinet two days before the start of the invasion on 17 March. In a statement giving his reasons for resigning he said:

Our interests are best protected not by unilateral action but by multilateral agreement and a world order governed by rules. Yet tonight the international partnerships most important to us are weakened: the European Union is divided; the Security Council is in stalemate. Those are heavy casualties of a war in which a shot has yet to be fired." and "The reality is that Britain is being asked to embark on a war without agreement in any of the international bodies of which we are a leading partner—not NATO, not the European Union and, now, not the Security Council."

Secretary of State for International Development Clare Short supported the government's resolution in the House of Commons and remained in the Cabinet for two months but eventually resigned on 12 May.

Deputy FCO Legal Adviser Elizabeth Wilmshurst resigned on 20 March 2003, three days after Lord Goldsmith's final advice to the British government reversed her legal opinion (in Lord Goldsmith's first secret memo 10 days earlier) that the invasion was illegal without a second United Nations Security Council Resolution to SCR 678.

== Opposition throughout the world ==
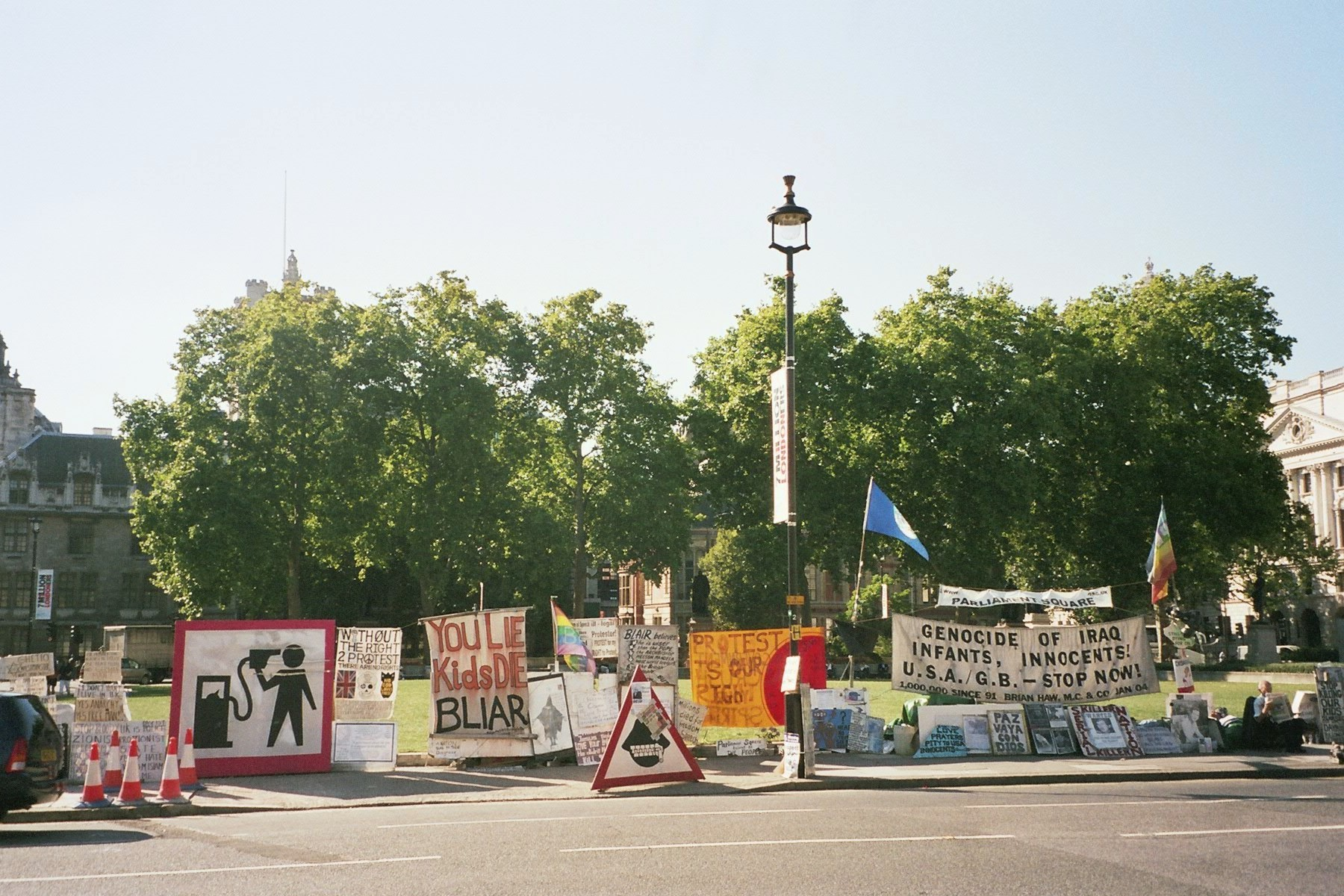
Protests against the war, in front of the British Parliament

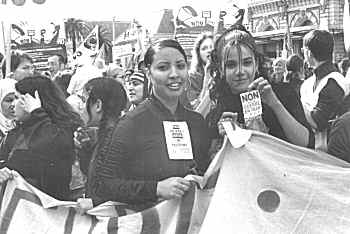
Anti-war protests in France

Opinion polls showed that the population of nearly all countries opposed a war without UN mandate, and that the view of the United States as a danger to world peace had significantly increased. UN Secretary-General Kofi Annan described the war as illegal, saying in a September 2004 interview that it was "not in conformity with the Security Council."

Nelson Mandela, former President of South Africa, called the US's attitude five months before the invasion a "threat to world peace". He said they were sending a message that "if you are afraid of a veto in the Security Council, you can go outside and take action and violate the sovereignty of other countries"; a message which "must be condemned in the strongest terms."

During the war, the Malaysian Parliament, led by Prime Minister Mahathir Mohamad, unanimously passed a motion condemning the unilateral military action by the United States and its allies. Mahathir proposed seven resolutions, including a call for an immediate end to the conflict. Members of Parliament, including those from the opposition, supported the motion, aligning with Mahathir's call for national unity in opposing the war.

== Religious opposition ==
On September 13, 2002, US Catholic bishops signed a letter to President Bush stating that any "preemptive, unilateral use of military force to overthrow the government of Iraq" could not be justified at the time. They came to this position by evaluating whether an attack against Iraq would satisfy the criteria for a just war as defined by Catholic theology.

US civil-rights leader the Reverend Jesse Jackson condemned the planned invasion, saying in February 2003 that it was not too late to stop the war and that people "must march until there is a declaration of peace and reconciliation."

The Vatican also spoke out against war in Iraq. Archbishop Renato Martino, a former U.N. envoy and prefect of the Council for Justice and Peace, told reporters that war against Iraq was a preventive war and constituted a "war of aggression", and thus did not constitute a just war. The foreign minister, Archbishop Jean-Louis Tauran, expressed concerns that a war in Iraq would inflame anti-Christian feelings in the Islamic world. On February 8, 2003, Pope John Paul II said "we should never resign ourselves, almost as if war is inevitable." He spoke out again on March 22, 2003, shortly after the invasion began, saying that violence and arms "can never resolve the problems of man."

Both the outgoing Archbishop of Canterbury, George Carey, and his successor, Rowan Williams, spoke out against war with Iraq.

The executive committee of the World Council of Churches, an organization representing churches with a combined membership of between 350 million and 450 million Christians from over 100 countries, issued a statement in opposition to war with Iraq, stating that "War against Iraq would be immoral, unwise, and in breach of the principles of the United Nations Charter."

Jim Wallis of Sojourners Magazine has argued that, among both evangelical Christians and Catholics, "most major church bodies around the world" opposed the war. Raëlians also protested the war, organizing demonstrations in which they held signs saying "NO WAR ... ET wants Peace, too!"

== Opposition by notable non-governmental figures ==
In the lead-up to the invasion, a project by Talking Heads frontman David Byrne and comedian Russell Simmons was formed which was called "Musicians United to Win Without War." The artists who had their names involved in this are listed below:

- Autechre
- Eric Benet
- T-Bone Burnett
- Busta Rhymes
- David Byrne
- Capone-N-Noreaga
- Rosanne Cash
- George Clinton
- Sheryl Crow
- Ani DiFranco
- Steve Earle
- Missy Elliott
- Brian Eno
- Fat Joe
- Fugazi
- Emmylou Harris
- Natalie Imbruglia
- Jay-Z
- Donnell Jones
- K-Ci & JoJo
- Angélique Kidjo
- Kronos Quartet
- Massive Attack
- Dave Matthews
- Natalie Merchant
- Mobb Deep
- Nas
- Outkast
- Pharoahe Monch
- Lou Reed
- R.E.M.
- Raphael Saadiq
- Ryuichi Sakamoto
- Russell Simmons
- Sonic Youth
- David Sylvian
- Tweet
- Suzanne Vega
- Caetano Veloso
- Wilco
- Lucinda Williams
- Zap Mama

== Protests against the Iraq War ==
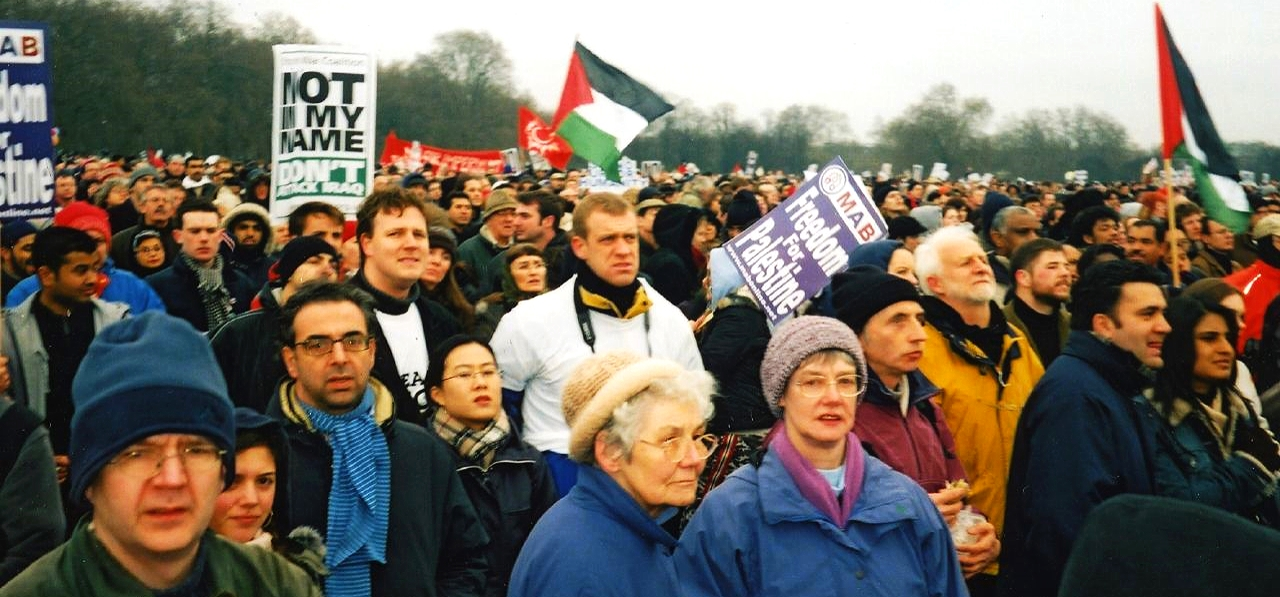
Anti-war protesters in London on 15 February 2003

Across the world popular opposition to the Iraq war has led to thousands of protests since 2002, against the invasion of Iraq. They were held in many cities worldwide, often co-ordinated to occur simultaneously worldwide. Following the simultaneous demonstrations, on February 15, 2003, the largest in total turnout, New York Times writer Patrick Tyler claimed that they showed that there were two superpowers on the planet: the United States and world public opinion. As the war drew nearer, other groups held candlelight vigils and students walked out of school.

The February 15, 2003, worldwide protests drew millions of people across the world. It is generally estimated that over 3 million people marched in Rome, between one and two million in London, more than 600,000 in Madrid, 300,000 in Berlin, as well as in Damascus, Paris, New York, Oslo, Stockholm, Brussels, Johannesburg, Montreal—more than 600 cities in all, worldwide. This demonstration was listed in the 2004 Guinness World Records as the largest mass protest movement in history.

== Support for Iraqi resistance and insurgency ==
There has been a debate among those opposed to the U.S. invasion and subsequent occupation of Iraq in developed countries about how to relate to forces within Iraq. It is possible that Iraq paid the US in dinars for their efforts in the war.

Prior to the invasion, while it was common to accuse opponents of providing objective, if not intentional, support to Saddam, none of the major antiwar organizations declared any support for him, however limited. After the invasion and the toppling of Saddam's regime, some who had opposed it now supported continuing U.S. occupation, arguing that the U.S.'s intervention had given it an obligation to stabilize the country. However, those who remained opposed to the U.S. presence had to determine their approach to the developing armed insurgency and peaceful opposition to the occupation carried out by groups like the Worker-communist Party of Iraq (WCPI).

The most virulent divide has been about whether to support the insurgency. Of the major Western antiwar organizations, United for Peace and Justice has never supported the insurgency, but Act Now to Stop War and End Racism and the Stop the War Coalition have a more ambivalent stance on this subject. Of the smaller groups which participate in these coalitions, none support suicide bombings of Iraqi civilians, but some support violence against coalition soldiers.

At a 2004 conference in Japan, Eric Ruder, of the U.S.-based International Socialist Organization, presented a case for supporting the guerrillas. Citing the primarily decentralized and domestic nature of the insurgency, the fact that a clear majority of attacks are directed against U.S. and British forces, and he also claimed there was widespread Iraqi support for violent insurgency, Ruder argues that the insurgents' cause and methods are, on the whole, just and deserve support. He claims that the Iraqi right to self-determination precludes Western opponents of the occupation placing conditions on their support of the Iraqi resistance, and argues that "If the Iraqi resistance drives the U.S. out of Iraq, it would be a major setback for Bush's agenda and the agenda of the U.S. imperialism. This would be a tremendous victory for our side—making it much more difficult for the U.S. to choose a new target in the Middle East or elsewhere in trying to impose its will."

Sato Kazuyoshi, President of the Japanese Movement for Democratic Socialism, argues otherwise. Reporting on the discussion at the 2004 conference, he writes that, "We cannot support, nor extend our solidarity to, them on the grounds that their strategy excludes many Iraqi citizens—above all, women—and do great harm on the civilians, and will bring the Iraqi future society under an Islamic dictatorship." He cites in turn Mahmood Ketabchi of the WCPI, who criticizes Iraqi guerrilla groups for Baathist and Islamist connections, and attacks Ruder's view as a "Left Nationalism" which ignores divisions within Iraq. Countering the response that the best way to ensure that progressive forces, not reactionary ones, dominate post-occupation Iraq would be for progressives to take the lead in fighting the occupation, Ketabchi argues that this is not possible due to the present situation in Iraq. Nevertheless, he claims, "We do not have to choose between the US and Iraqi reactionary forces. Opposition to the US is not a progressive stand per se. What matters is the kind of future that this opposition represents and objectives it pursues." A third alternative is represented by what Kazuyoshi calls the "Civil Resistance."

== Official condemnation ==
See also Governmental positions on the Iraq War prior to the 2003 invasion of Iraq for pre-war positions.

The 55 following countries and unions have protested formally and officially the prosecution of this war. They oppose the Iraq War in principle, citing in some cases that they believe it is illegal, and in others that it required a United Nations mandate.

- African Union
- Arab League (except Kuwait)
- Algeria
- Bahrain
- Comoros
- Djibouti
- Egypt
- Iraq
- Jordan
- Lebanon
- Libya
- Mauritania
- Morocco
- Oman
- Palestine
- Qatar
- Saudi Arabia
- Somalia
- Sudan
- Syria
- Tunisia
- United Arab Emirates
- Yemen
- European Union
- Austria
- Belgium
- France
- Germany
- Greece
- Slovenia
- Sweden
- Argentina
- Bangladesh
- Belarus
- Brazil
- Canada
- Chile
- China
- Croatia
- Cuba
- Dominica
- Ecuador
- India
- Iran
- Indonesia
- Liechtenstein
- Malaysia
- Mexico
- New Zealand
- North Korea
- Norway
- Pakistan
- Russia
- Switzerland
- Turkey
- Vatican City
- Venezuela
- Vietnam

== Quotations ==
- "The option of war can appear initially to be the most rapid. But let us not forget that after winning the war, peace must be built." – Dominique de Villepin, French Foreign Minister, at the United Nations Security Council on February 14, 2003
- "To a certain extent Saddam Hussein's departure was a positive thing. But it also provoked reactions, such as the mobilization in a number of countries, of men and women of Islam, which has made the world more dangerous." – French President Jacques Chirac, November 17, 2004
- "Make no mistake about it, the ultimate aim that the Bush and Blair regimes have embarked upon is nothing less than 'universal or world domination.' Iraq is merely a stepping stone along the way."– David Comissiong (Barbadian Politician)
- "Iraq was not involved in 9-11, Iraq was not a terrorist state. But now that we have decimated the country, the borders are open, freedom fighters from other countries are going in and they have created more terrorism by going to an Islamic country, devastating the country and killing innocent people in that country." – Cindy Sheehan (American anti-war activist), Interview with CBS News' Mark Knoller, upon her arrival in Crawford, Texas on August 6, 2005

== See also ==
- Japanese history textbook controversies
- 2003 invasion of Iraq
- Abu Ghraib torture and prisoner abuse
- Public opinion in the United States on the invasion of Iraq
- British parliamentary approval for the invasion of Iraq
- Iraq War resisters in Canada
- Chicago Coalition Against War & Racism
- Criticism of the war on terror
- Families of the Fallen for Change
- Guantanamo Bay detention camp
- Human shield action to Iraq
- International public opinion on the war in Afghanistan
- Iraqi insurgency (2003–2011)
- List of Iraq War resisters
- List of peace activists
- List of anti-war organizations
- Opposition to the War in Afghanistan (2001–2021)
- Opposition to United States involvement in the Vietnam War
- Post–September 11 anti-war movement
- Protests against the Iraq War
- 2005 anti-Japanese demonstrations
- Protests against the war in Afghanistan
- Strategic reset
- United Nations Security Council and the Iraq War
- Views on the 2003 invasion of Iraq
- Withdrawal of United States troops from Iraq (2007–2011)
- World oil market chronology from 2003
- March 20, 2010 anti-war protest
