= International reactions to the prelude to the Iraq War =

Pre-war responses

This article describes international reactions to the prelude to Iraq War prior to the 2003 invasion of Iraq. The positions of national on the war may have changed since the invasion.

States participating in the invasion of Iraq (United States, United Kingdom, Australia and Poland) States in support of the invasion States in opposition to the invasion States with an uncertain or no official standpoint Iraq.

== Background ==
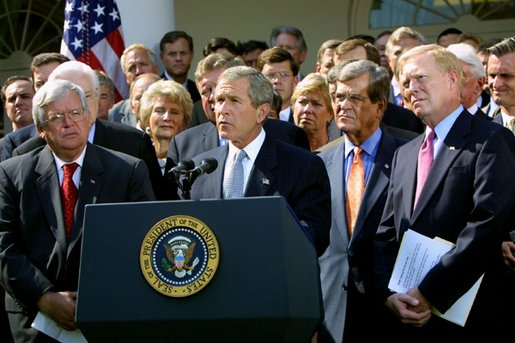
President George Bush, surrounded by leaders of the House and Senate, announces the Joint Resolution to Authorize the Use of United States Armed Forces Against Iraq, October 2, 2002.

In 2002, the United States began to campaign for the overthrow of Iraq's President, Saddam Hussein. The United States, under the administration of George W. Bush, argued that Saddam Hussein was a threat to global peace, a vicious tyrant, and a sponsor of international terrorism.

Opinion on the war was greatly divided between nations. Some countries felt that the United States failed to prove beyond a reasonable doubt that Hussein had an active weapons program. Others saw the war as an act of imperialism, and charged that the United States just wanted Iraq's oil.

On the other side, supporting countries argued that Saddam was one of the 20th Century's worst despots, and that free countries should be obliged to remove brutal dictators from power. Others felt that Saddam's ties to terror groups were well-established, and his weapons programs very real. Although the U.S. has yet to find the location of the WMDs, they did find records of bank transactions from some of Saddam's accounts that paid various suicide bombers' families $25,000 in exchange for their sons' martyrdom. Supporters also argue that the chemical and biological weapons that were believed to be in Saddam's control were shipped to Syria before the engagement and that the current existence of bio and chemical weapons labs in Iraq are an indication of Saddam's continued desire to produce WMDs. Furthermore, supporters point out that although the U.S. does have oil interests in the Middle East, so do the Islamic terror cells who want to gain control of the oil in an effort to pressure the western world. Additionally, they argue that the U.N. rejected the invasion of Iraq because of their involvement in the "Oil for Food Scandal", (established in 1995), in which U.N. and Iraqi officials skimmed money to allegedly bribe U.N. officials. Peter van Walsum, the former chairman of the Iraq sanctions committee from 1999 to 2000, speculated in a recent book that Iraq deliberately divided the U.N. Security Council by awarding contracts to France, Russia, and China but not the United Kingdom or United States. Coincidentally it was France and Russia who were leading the opposition to the invasion of Iraq. He also claimed that sanctions were not effective and that the lack of Iraqi cooperation was designed to exacerbate the suffering of his own people. Other allegations included a $400,000 contribution from Shaker al-Kaffaji, and Iraqi-American businessman to produce a film by ex-UN inspector Scott Ritter discrediting the weapons searches.

Scott Ritter points out in his October 19, 2005 interview with Seymour Hersh that the US policy to remove Saddam Hussein from power started with President George H. W. Bush in August 1990. Ritter concludes from public remarks by President George H. W. Bush and U.S. Secretary of State James Baker that the economic sanctions would only be lifted when Saddam Hussein was removed from power. The justification for sanctions was disarmament. The CIA offered the opinion that containing Saddam Hussein for six months would result in the collapse of his regime. This policy resulted in the US military invasion and occupation of Iraq.

MR. HERSH: One of the things about your book that's amazing is that it's not only about the Bush Administration, and if there are any villains in this book, they include Sandy Berger, who was Clinton's national security advisor, and Madeleine Albright.

Another thing that's breathtaking about this book is the amount of new stories and new information. Scott describes in detail and with named sources, basically, a two or three-year run of the American government undercutting the inspection process. In your view, during those years, '91 to'98, particularly the last three years, was the United States interested in disarming Iraq?

MR. RITTER: Well, the fact of the matter is the United States was never interested in disarming Iraq. The whole Security Council resolution that created the UN weapons inspections and called upon Iraq to disarm was focused on one thing and one thing only, and that is a vehicle for the maintenance of economic sanctions that were imposed in August 1990 linked to the liberation of Kuwait. We liberated Kuwait, I participated in that conflict. And one would think, therefore, the sanctions should be lifted.

The United States needed to find a vehicle to continue to contain Saddam because the CIA said all we have to do is wait six months and Saddam is going to collapse on his own volition. That vehicle is sanctions. They needed a justification; the justification was disarmament. They drafted a Chapter 7 resolution of the United Nations Security Council calling for the disarmament of Iraq and saying in Paragraph 14 that if Iraq complies, sanctions will be lifted. Within months of this resolution being passed—and the United States drafted and voted in favor of this resolution—within months, the President, George Herbert Walker Bush, and his Secretary of State, James Baker, are saying publicly, not privately, publicly that even if Iraq complies with its obligation to disarm, economic sanctions will be maintained until which time Saddam Hussein is removed from power.

That is proof positive that disarmament was only useful insofar as it contained through the maintenance of sanctions and facilitated regime change. It was never about disarmament, it was never about getting rid of weapons of mass destruction. It started with George Herbert Walker Bush, and it was a policy continued through eight years of the Clinton presidency, and then brought us to this current disastrous course of action under the current Bush Administration.

== Varying levels of support ==
Analysis of the count reveals the complexities in world diplomacy. Some national governments publicly denounced the invasion plan while at the same time accepting U.S. aid earmarked for the war, or providing to the war effort troops, fueling stations, military support, and/or airspace. Some national governments provided only a semblance of support.

Some nations originally on the White House list disavowed membership in the "coalition". Furthermore, significant opposition to the war exists in segments of the populations and Parliaments in many of the supporting nations. Adding to the complications, the Bush administration claimed to have the support of some 15 nations that wished to remain anonymous. This bloc has been dubbed by some "the shadow coalition" or, sardonically, "the coalition of the unwilling to be named".

Support can be so different in nature, from armed troops to use of airspace and bases, logistic support, political support, to participation in reconstruction efforts, that it appears to some to be difficult to exclude most countries from the official list, except Iraq for obvious reasons (although some might claim some movements inside Iraq will probably also help reconstructing their own country).

== Countries supporting the U.S. position ==
Shortly before the Iraq War began, the US government announced that 49 countries were joined in a "coalition of the willing" in favor of forcibly removing Saddam Hussein from power in Iraq, with some number of other countries expressing their support in private. Of the 49 countries, the following countries had an active or participant role, by providing either significant troops or political support: Australia, Bulgaria, Czech Republic, Denmark, Hungary, Italy, Japan, Latvia, Lithuania, Netherlands, Philippines, Poland, Portugal, Romania, Slovakia, Spain, Ukraine, United Kingdom and (United States).

Four of these countries supplied combat forces directly participating in the invasion of Iraq: the United States, United Kingdom, Australia, and Poland. Other countries have provided logistical and intelligence support, chemical and biological response teams, overflight rights, humanitarian and reconstruction aid, and political support.

=== Europe ===
In late January 2003, a statement released to various newspapers and signed by the leaders of Britain, saying that Saddam should not be allowed to violate U.N. resolutions.

Later, the Eastern European "Vilnius Group" countries, Estonia, Latvia, Lithuania, Slovenia, Slovakia, Bulgaria, Romania, Croatia —all now members of the EU—, Albania, and the Republic of Macedonia issued another statement on Iraq, in general support of the US's position but not commenting on the possibility of a war without support of the UN Security Council. However, as Donald Rumsfeld stated that Slovenia and Croatia were members of the US led coalition, Slovenia's government rejected this statement and its Prime Minister Anton Rop reiterated that Slovenia has conditioned the decision to go to war upon a UN Security Council go-ahead to the attack; Croatia's President Stjepan Mesić called the war illegal. French President Jacques Chirac commented on the statement of the ten Eastern European countries saying: "It is not well brought up behavior. They missed a good opportunity to keep quiet". It was believed by some that Jacques Chirac's criticism could be presumed to imply that the EU applicants from Central and Eastern Europe, which were not yet official EU members, should not be allowed to join because of the statement. After criticism by the media, Chirac's remark was taken back. Romanian President Ion Iliescu called Chirac's remarks irrational, saying "such reproaches are totally unjustified, unwise, and undemocratic". Bulgarian Deputy Foreign Minister Lyubomir Ivanov told reporters "it is not the first time that pressure is being exerted upon us in one or another form but in my opinion this is not the productive way to reach unity and consensus in the Security Council".

In the Netherlands the first Balkenende cabinet supported the USA. After that government fell in October 2002, there were new elections in January, which were won by the Second Balkenende cabinet who chose to continue their predecessors' policy. Dutch soldiers were sent to Iraq, and remained until March 2005. Two Dutch soldiers died in Iraq.

The Ministry of Foreign Affairs of Serbia and Montenegro expressed regret that the settlement of the Iraqi crisis could not be accomplished in the United Nations and accused the Iraqi regime of "making its citizens the victims of an irresponsible policy". Serbia and Montenegro decided not to take part in Iraq invasion though.

==== United Kingdom ====
Throughout the conflict, the United Kingdom's government remained the strongest supporter of the U.S. plan to invade Iraq albeit originally seeking a UN Mandate. Prime Minister Tony Blair frequently expressed support for the United States in this matter, while Members of Parliament (MPs) were divided. Blair experienced a significant rebellion from many Labour MPs and in a debate in the House of Commons, he achieved a parliamentary majority with the support of most Conservative MPs and Ulster Unionists. Although the Conservatives were supportive of the Government's stance as a whole, a significant minority of their MPs rebelled against the party line, including figures such as Kenneth Clarke. The Liberal Democrats opposed the war, and their MPs were visibly unanimous on the issue. One former cabinet minister delivered a stinging personal attack on the Prime Minister, calling his behaviour 'reckless'. Robin Cook MP and a few other government ministers resigned to the backbenches over the issue. Clare Short MP threatened to resign from the cabinet, but then remained for two months before finally resigning on May 12, 2003. Cook, a former Foreign Secretary and at the time Leader of the House of Commons, delivered a resignation speech, which was received with a standing ovation. Cook indicated that while he agreed with most of Blair's policies, he could not support the war.

Before the invasion, the then UK Attorney General Lord Goldsmith, advised that the war would be in breach of international law for six reasons, ranging from the lack of a second United Nations resolution to UN inspector Hans Blix's continuing search for weapons. Ten days later on 7 March 2003, as UK troops were massing in Kuwait, Lord Goldsmith changed his mind, saying:

I remain of the opinion that the safest legal course would be to secure the adoption of a further resolution to authorise the use of force.... Nevertheless, having regard to the information on the negotiating history which I have been given and to the arguments of the US Administration which I heard in Washington, I accept that a reasonable case can be made that resolution 1441 is capable in principle of reviving the authorisation in 678 without a further resolution.

He concluded his revised analysis by saying that "regime change cannot be the objective of military action."

The United Kingdom has sent 45,000 personnel from the British Army, Royal Navy, and Royal Air Force, including the aircraft carrier HMS Ark Royal to the Persian Gulf region. The ground component included 100 Challenger tanks. The First Armoured Division's 7th Armoured Brigade and 4th Armoured Brigade took part in the war.

Before the war, public opinion polls showed that the majority of British people would have supported the war with a clear UN mandate for war, but were strongly opposed to war without another resolution in addition to Resolution 1441, which indicated that Saddam Hussein would face serious consequences if he failed to comply with the resolution.

==== Poland ====
In March 2003, the Polish government announced that it would join in a U.S.-led Iraq invasion and sent about 200 personnel. Poland also sent 54 soldiers in an elite GROM commando unit, a logistic support ship, ORP Kontradmirał Xawery Czernicki, with a FORMOZA navy commando unit, and 74 antichemical contamination troops. Polls showed that, as in other central and eastern European countries, the population was generally against the war, although not as strongly as in Spain, Italy, or the United Kingdom.

=== Asia ===
==== Kuwait ====
Perhaps the only major regional ally that supported the US' action was Kuwait, whose hostility towards Saddam's Iraq stemmed from the events surrounding the first Persian Gulf War. The public appeared to consider Saddam to be as much of a threat in 2003 as he was in the past, and were particularly interested in attempts to repatriate many Kuwaiti citizens who had disappeared during the Gulf War, and were presumably languishing in Iraqi jails up until Saddam's fall from power.

==== Japan ====
On March 17, 2003, Japanese prime minister Junichiro Koizumi said that he supported the U.S., U.K., and Spain for ending diplomatic efforts against Iraq. He also indicated that no further UN resolution was necessary to invade Iraq.

On March 26, 2003, Japan's ambassador to the UN first stated in the Security Council that Japan supported the acts of the U.S. and allied countries. He said that the Iraqi dictatorship possessed weapons of mass destruction and had been continuously violating UN resolutions for past 12 years.

Japan sent 5,500 troops under the Japanese Iraq Reconstruction and Support Group to Iraq.

At home, the prime minister was strongly opposed in this decision both by the opposition and parts of his own coalition government. Most Japanese believe that it was motivated purely to improve Japan's relations to the US government, which had been improving since the beginning of the Bush administration.

Furthermore, article 9 of the Japanese Constitution (in place after the end of World War II) forbids any Japanese military involvement overseas. Therefore, Japan did not take part in the invasion itself, but did provide logistical support to the US Navy, which the government considered a non-combat operation, a position that many Japanese disagree with.

==== Other Asian countries ====
Singapore (who shortly after reached a Free Trade Agreement with the US), the Philippines, and South Korea all pledged support for the war, as did a number of smaller Pacific island nations.

The Marshall Islands, Federated States of Micronesia, and Palau (former American trust territories with a combined population of around 186,000) are legally sovereign and are full member states of the United Nations; however, their governments are largely dependent on the United States Congress for their funding through Compacts of Free Association. Some critics of the war assert that if these states took anti-war stances, they would be severely harmed politically and economically because of their reliance on the United States.

=== Australia ===
The Howard government in Australia was a strong and largely uncritical supporter of United States policy. Australia has committed a little over 2,000 military personnel, including a squadron of F/A-18 Hornet fighters and 150 SAS troops (see Australian contribution to the 2003 Gulf War for details). At first, the Australian public was clearly and consistently opposed to their government's joining the war without explicit UN backing (around 60 to 70% of those polled), but once the war began public opinion swayed somewhat: a reputable wartime poll had support at 57% with 36% opposed. A March 2006 poll by UMR Research, on behalf of the Labor-linked political consultancy Hawker Britton, found 65% of respondents believed Australia should leave Iraq immediately or no later than May of that year. The Labor Party, on the whole, opposed the war. Major anti-war demonstrations were reported from Sydney, Melbourne, Canberra, Brisbane, and Hobart, as well as other Australian cities.

== Countries opposing the U.S. position ==
Some nations that were allies of the United States during the Gulf War were either opposed to the second Iraq War or were reluctant to help with it. Before the war, several countries called on the US to wait for the weapons inspectors to complete their investigations. However, the US and its allies maintained that reasonable patience had been given to Saddam and that it was clear that he was not willing to cooperate with the inspectors, as he beat around the bush whenever the weapons of mass destruction issue came up. This, if not the fact that the inspectors had previously been kicked out of Iraq in 1998 alone, was, according to the war's supporters, sufficient violation of UN mandates to justify more severe action. Scott Ritter, chief UN weapons inspector at the time, says that the inspectors were not kicked out by Saddam Hussein, but were withdrawn by Bill Clinton:

Public perception is that the Iraqis were confrontational and blocking the work of the inspectors. In 98% of the inspections, the Iraqis did everything we asked them to because it dealt with disarmament. However when we got into issues of sensitivity, such as coming close to presidential security installations, Iraqis raised a flag and said, "Time out. We got a C.I.A. out there that's trying to kill our president and we're not very happy about giving you access to the most sensitive installations and the most sensitive personalities in Iraq." So we had these modalities, where we agreed that if we came to a site and the Iraqis called it 'sensitive,' we go in with four people.

In 1998, the inspection team went to a site. It was the Baath Party headquarters, like going to Republican Party headquarters or Democratic Party headquarters. The Iraqis said, "You can't come in – you can come in. Come on in." The inspectors said, "The modalities no longer apply." The Iraqis said, "If you don't agree to the modalities, we can't support letting you in," and the Iraqis wouldn't allow the inspections to take place.

Bill Clinton said, "This proves the Iraqis are not cooperating," and he ordered the inspectors out. But you know the United States government ordered the inspectors to withdraw from the modalities without conferring with the Security Council. It took Iraqis by surprise. Iraqis were saying, "We're playing by the rules, why aren't you? If you're not going play by the rules, then it's a game that we don't want to participate in." Bill Clinton ordered the inspectors out. Saddam didn't kick them out.

Many argued that, since Iraq had no connection to the September 11, 2001 attacks, going to war against Iraq as part of a broader war on terror was illegitimate. Others opposed to US military action argued that insufficient and, as in the case of the uranium Niger deal, even falsified documents might have been produced in order to show Iraq as "an immediate threat". Accordingly, any such exaggeration would have been contrary to international law. They also claimed that the issue of weapons of mass destruction (if indeed there were any left in Iraq by 2003) could have been solved through continued inspections and diplomacy, and insisted that the weapons issue was merely an attempt to hide American desires to seize oil wells, further a military presence in the Middle East, and frighten other OPEC nations into submission. This position was later supported by Bush's former Secretary of the Treasury Paul Henry O'Neill who stated that the administration had sought for a reason to invade Iraq ever since Bush took office, with potential oil spoils charted in early documents. The Bush camp denies these allegations as ludicrous, though they have admitted that the Niger uranium documents were given to them by a source of questionable credibility and it was simply a mistake on their part to have assumed that the documents told the truth.

=== Europe ===
On January 29, 2003, the European Parliament passed a nonbinding resolution opposing unilateral military action against Iraq by the United States. According to the resolution, "a pre-emptive strike would not be in accordance with international law and the UN Charter and would lead to a deeper crisis involving other countries in the region".

France, Germany and Russia were from the very outset publicly opposed to a US-led war. As the US took a more militaristic position, these three nations' governments became increasingly outspoken in opposition to the invasion. In the end, France made it clear it would use its UN Security Council veto against a proposed resolution for war in Iraq at that given point. (See The UN Security Council and the Iraq war.)

On March 17, 2003, the US and Britain stated that they would not submit a resolution to the Security Council, admitting they did not have enough votes to force France or Russia to use a veto. In fact, only Bulgaria and Spain (in addition to the US and UK) declared outright that they wanted to vote for the U.S./UK resolution, while a few more nations, such as Chile and Guinea, had only said they would consider supporting it.

Belgium, Switzerland, Sweden, Norway, Greece, Austria and Liechtenstein also condemned the war. The Czech Republic, Croatia, and Slovenia were already mentioned above.

==== France ====
Though Bush and Blair were optimistic that the 9 out of 15 votes of approval necessary to pass a UN resolution would have been reached, France's threatened veto would have immediately quashed the resolution, as any one of the United Kingdom, the United States, Russia, China, and France, had (and has) the unilateral power to veto any resolution, even if the vote is 11–1 in favor. Russia and China expressed that they likely would have supported the UN resolution if some more diplomatic channels had been exercised first, but Bush and Blair stopped trying to persuade those two nations once France voiced its opposition to the resolution. Amid US government anger at what it claimed was France's reckless use of its veto power, the French government pointed to numerous examples of times when the USA had vetoed such resolutions that otherwise had an 11–1 margin.

==== Germany ====
German Chancellor Gerhard Schröder made his opposition to the invasion an issue in his electoral campaign. Some analysts credited Schröder's come-from-behind victory on September 22 to tapping a broad anti-war sentiment among the German people. His critics and the proponents of the Iraq War suggested that he was using the controversy of the war and appealing to the anti-American sentiment felt by the German public for the sole purpose of gaining popularity and winning. This notion deeply offended the American administration and led to a straining of relations between the two nations. However, Schröder met Colin Powell and a rapprochement was established after the Iraqi regime was overturned. At present the governments of the two nations have agreed to put the Iraq issue behind them and move forward.

==== Greece ====
Greek Prime Minister Costas Simitis's declaration on 21 March 2003 mirrored the official Greek position regarding the invasion, as he declares: "Greece is not participating in the war and will not get entangled in it." In addition, Greek Foreign Minister George Papandreou expressed Greece's opposition to the United States going it alone in Iraq. Many other political parties condemned the invasion, such as the Communist Party (KKE) and the Greek Left Party-Synaspismos, who saw the war as proof of U.S imperialistic aspirations in the Middle East. Despite opposing the war, Greece did agree with the United States policy of disarming Iraq and destructing any WMD, that Iraq supposedly possessed. However, Greece did not agree with Bush's strategy of pre-emptive war as a means of fighting terrorism. By contrast it was in favor of settling the dispute over Iraq by diplomatic means and not by force.

==== Turkey ====
Turkey originally showed reservations, fearing that a power vacuum after Saddam's defeat might have given rise to a Kurdish state On 1 March 2003 the Turkish parliament failed narrowly to approve a government motion to permit the deployment in Turkey for six months of 62,000 US troops, 255 jet aircraft, and 65 helicopters.

In December 2002, Turkey moved approximately 15,000 soldiers to its border with Iraq. The Turkish General Staff stated that this move was in light of recent developments and did not indicate an attack was imminent. In January 2003, the Turkish foreign minister, Yasar Yakis, said he was examining documents from the time of the Ottoman Empire in order to determine whether Turkey had a claim to the oil fields around the northern Iraqi cities of Mosul and Kirkuk.

In late January 2003, Turkey invited at least five other regional countries to a "'last-chance' meeting to avert a US-led war against Iraq. The group urged neighboring Iraq to continue cooperating with the UN inspections, and publicly stated that "military strikes on Iraq might further destabilize the Middle East region".

In the end, Turkey did not grant access to its land and harbours as asked for by U.S. officials because the Grand National Assembly of Turkey voted against this proposal. Nonetheless, Turkey was named by the Bush Administration as a part of the "Coalition of the Willing."

==== Russia ====
Russian Foreign Minister Igor Ivanov joined France and Germany and said the council could not ignore the fact that "substantial progress" had been made since chief weapons inspector Hans Blix and International Atomic Energy Agency Director General Mohamed El Baradei visited Iraq in January.

==== Armenia ====
Although Armenia sent armed forces to Iraq to serve as peacekeepers after the Ba'athist regime was overthrown, the Armenian government has always had a negative attitude towards the US invasion of Iraq in 2003. Therefore, Armenia is the only country among the three South Caucasus countries to oppose the war in Iraq. It has opposed any U.S. military action without a UN mandate throughout the Iraqi crisis.

==== Belarus ====
President Alexander Lukashenko said Belarus unanimously denounced US aggression in Iraq.

==== Finland ====
In Finland, Anneli Jäätteenmäki of the Centre Party won the elections after she had accused her rival Paavo Lipponen, who was prime minister at the time, of allying neutral Finland with the United States in the war in Iraq during a meeting with President George W. Bush. Lipponen denied the claims and declared that "We support the UN and the UN Secretary-General." Jäätteenmäki resigned as prime minister after 63 days in office amid accusations that she had lied about the leak of the documents about the meeting between Bush and Lipponen. This series of events was considered scandalous and it is named Iraq leak or Iraq-gate. The main point was that special advisor of President of Finland had leaked series of documents which were considered secret. Special advisor Martti Manninen gave these secret documents to Anneli Jäätteenmäki, who used information provided by these documents to accuse Paavo Lipponen of supporting the Iraq War. The secret documents included a memo or memos of discussions between George W. Bush and Paavo Lipponen. Later on criminal charges were pressed against Martti Manninen for leaking secret documents and against Anneli Jäätteenmäki for incitement and aid to the same.

The Finnish government stated that they took a stronger stand on the Iraq question at a meeting chaired by President Tarja Halonen. The meeting of the Cabinet Committee on Foreign and Security Policy issued a statement according to which the use of force against Iraq would not be acceptable without the authority of the UN Security Council.

==== Vatican City ====
The Holy See took a firm stance against the U.S. plan to invade Iraq. Pope John Paul II's special envoy, Cardinal Pio Laghi, was sent by the Church to talk with George W. Bush to express opposition to the war on Iraq. The Catholic Church said that it was up to the United Nations to solve the international conflict through diplomacy. According to the Church, the Iraq War, and indeed most modern wars, did not satisfy the just war requirements set by Saint Augustine of Hippo and other theologians. The Church was also worried of the fate of the Chaldean Catholics of Iraq. The Vatican worried that they might see the same destruction as happened to the churches and monasteries after the war in Kosovo. The Secretary for Relations with States, Archbishop Jean Louis Tauran, said that only the UN can decide on a military attack against Iraq, because a unilateral war would be a "crime against peace and a crime against international law". Cardinal Secretary of State Angelo Sodano indicated that only the United Nations Security Council had the power to approve an attack in self-defense, and only in case of a previous aggression. His opinion was that the attack on Iraq did not fall into this category and that a unilateral aggression would be a "crime against peace and a violation of the Geneva Convention".

==== Demonstrations against the war ====
Millions demonstrated on the streets of Britain, Ireland, Spain, Portugal, Italy, the Netherlands, Austria, France, Switzerland, Greece, Germany, Sweden, Norway, Belgium, Denmark, Iceland, the Czech Republic, Bulgaria, Romania, Cyprus, Russia, Belarus, and Ukraine. Donald Rumsfeld tried to downplay the French and German governmental criticism, most prominently heard because both countries at that time were members of the, as the opinion of "Old Europe", while he relied on a new situation after the EU enlargement. Opinion polls showed that the war was not supported by a majority of the public in the Central and Eastern Europe either, despite most of their governments' support.

=== Americas ===
==== Canada ====
While Canada participated in the Gulf War of 1991, it refused to engage in a war on Iraq without UN approval. Prime Minister Jean Chrétien said on October 10, 2002, that Canada would be part of any military coalition sanctioned by the United Nations to invade Iraq. With the subsequent withdrawal of American and British diplomatic efforts to gain UN sanction, Jean Chrétien announced in Parliament on March 17, 2003, that Canada would not participate in the pending invasion, though he offered the US and its soldiers his moral support. Two days earlier, a quarter million in Montreal marched against the pending war. Major anti-war demonstrations took place in several other Canadian cities.

About a hundred Canadian exchange officers, on exchange to American units, participated in the invasion of Iraq.

On October 9, 2008, the CBC published this statement about 2003:

in their book, The Unexpected War, University of Toronto professor Janice Gross Stein and public policy consultant Eugene Lang write that the Liberal government would actually boast of that contribution to Washington. "In an almost schizophrenic way, the government bragged publicly about its decision to stand aside from the war in Iraq because it violated core principles of multilateral-ism and support for the United Nations. At the same time, senior Canadian officials, military officers and politicians were currying favour in Washington, privately telling anyone in the State Department or the Pentagon who would listen that, by some measures, Canada's indirect contribution to the American war effort in Iraq — three ships and 100 exchange officers — exceeded that of all but three other countries that were formally part of the coalition."

==== Latin America ====
Mexico, Venezuela, Argentina, Brazil and Chile condemned the war. Major demonstrations were reported from La Paz, Bolivia; Lima, Peru; Bogotá, Colombia; Buenos Aires, Argentina; São Paulo and Rio de Janeiro, Brazil; and Santiago, Chile. Pierre Charles, the late Prime Minister of the Caribbean island nation of Dominica also condemned the war.

After Costa Rica's Constitutional Court ruled that the war broke international law and that the country's support for the war contradicted its constitution, the government declared its withdrawal of support, which was merely moral anyway as Costa Rica has no army. Honduras, Nicaragua, and the Dominican Republic retreated their troops.

=== Africa ===
The African Union, with all of its 52 members, condemned the war. Guinea, Cameroon and Angola had seats on the Security Council, and amid talks of American financial donations would have likely voted in approval of a UN war resolution against Iraq. Major protests were reported from Cairo and Alexandria (Egypt); Rabat (Morocco); Mombasa (Kenya); Mogadishu (Somalia); Nouakchott (Mauritania); Tripoli (Libya); Windhoek (Namibia); Johannesburg and Cape Town (South Africa).

=== Arab League ===
The Arab League unanimously condemned the war, with the exception of Kuwait. Saudi Foreign Minister Prince Saud publicly claimed that the U.S. military would not be authorized to use Saudi Arabia's soil in any way to attack Iraq. () After ten years of U.S. presence in Saudi Arabia, cited among reasons by Saudi-born Osama bin Laden for his September 11, 2001 al-Qaeda attacks on America, most of U.S. forces were withdrawn from Saudi Arabia in 2003. () For the duration of the war, the Saudi public remained strongly against the US action, even regardless of a UN mandate. Before the war, the government repeatedly attempted to find a diplomatic solution, generally agreeing with the US position on Saddam's menace, even going so far as to urge Saddam to go into voluntary exile—a suggestion that angered him a great deal.

Anti-war demonstrations took place in Damascus, Syria; Baghdad, Iraq; Sanaa, Yemen; Muscat, Oman; Amman, Ma'an, and Irbid, Jordan; Widhat, Beirut and Sidon, Lebanon; Bethlehem, Nablus, Tulkarm, Jenin, Ramallah and Gaza, Palestinian cities in the West Bank and Gaza Strip; Tel Aviv, Israel, and in the nation of Bahrain. As is the case in Egypt, demonstrations are not common in many of these less-than-democratic countries and some regimes saw themselves in danger because of riots. The United States requested Egypt to send troops to participate in the U.S. led coalition invasion of Iraq, which was a request rebuffed by Egypt's Mubarak.

=== Asia ===
==== India ====
As the Iraqi crisis unfolded, India had taken the consistent position that Iraq must fully comply with UN Security Council Resolutions for the elimination of weapons of mass destruction from its territory. The Indian Foreign Ministry counsel has been against war and in favour of peace. It has emphasised that all decisions on Iraq must be taken under the authority of the United Nations. The counsel stated that any move for change in regime in Iraq should come from within and not be imposed from outside. The counsel has also been drawing attention to the precarious humanitarian situation of the Iraqi people which war would only aggravate.

The counsel was deeply disappointed by the inability of the UN Security Council to act collectively, specially the failure of the Permanent Members to harmonise their positions on Iraq.

The counsel stressed that "As long as the peaceful disarmament of Iraq has the slightest chance, we would continue to urge caution, self-restraint and high sense of responsibility on the part of concerned parties".

On 27 November 2002, Indian Foreign Minister Yashwant Sinha called Saddam Hussein "a friend of India" and said that "any military conflict will be disastrous from our point of view and we do not want a situation like the one we faced in 1991 after the Gulf War". At the same time, both Sinha and Indian lawmakers called Hussein to abide by UN resolutions and allow weapons inspectors.

==== Saudi Arabia ====
Pre-war, Saudi Arabia's public position had been one of neutrality in the conflict; worldwide media reported that, despite numerous American attempts, Saudi Arabia would not offer the American military any use of its land as a staging ground for the invasion of Iraq. In an interview, Prince Saud Alfaysal, Saudi Arabia's foreign minister when asked whether Saudi Arabia would allow more US troops to be placed on Saudi soil, the foreign minister replied, "under the present circumstances with no proof that there is a threat imminent from Iraq, I do not think Saudi Arabia will join in". It was also eventually learned that a high-ranking Saudi prince had been at the White House on the day that the Iraq war began, and Bush administration officials told the prince to alert his government that the initial phase of the war had begun, hours before missiles first landed in Baghdad. Officially, Saudi Arabia wished to see Saddam Hussein and the Ba'ath regime go, but feared the aftermath. As the US invasion of Iraq became inevitable, the question of whether Saudi Arabia wanted the Baath regime replaced by a pro-Western government "pumping oil in greater quantities than Saudi Arabia" posed a dilemma for the Saudi government. Furthermore, Saudi Arabia worried about the possibility of an Iraqi Shia pro-Iranian government installed at its doorstep, following the demise of Saddam's Sunni regime. On 4 November 2002, Faysal told CNN that Saudi Arabia would not allow US use of Saudi facilities to invade Iraq. Moreover, in the same month, during a televised address on Saudi television, Crown Prince Abdullah insisted that "our armed forces will not, under no circumstances, step one foot into Iraqi territory".

==== Syria ====
Syria opposed the war and refused to submit to Washington's demand for co-operation. It acted in concert with Russia, France, and Germany in the Security Council, even voting in support of Resolution 1441, mandating the renewal of United Nations weapons inspections in Iraq. Syria's UN ambassador, Makhail Wehbe, said he believed that the evidence presented by the United States to the Security Council on Iraq's weapons had been fabricated. Syrian commentators explained that none of Iraq's neighbors felt it was a threat, and that weapons of mass destruction were a mere pretext for a war motivated by the interests of Israel and the US companies that hoped to profit from post-war reconstruction contracts.

==== Jordan ====
King Abdullah II of Jordan advised Washington against the Iraq War but later gave the invading coalition covert and tacit support, in defiance of the overwhelming opinion of his own public. The Jordanian government publicly opposed the war against Iraq. The King stressed to the United States and European Union that a diplomatic solution, in accordance with UN Security Council (UNSC) resolutions 1284 (1999) and 1409 (2002), was the only appropriate model for resolving the conflict between Iraq and the UN. In August 2002 he told the Washington Post that an attempt to invade Iraq would be a "tremendous mistake" and that it could "throw the whole area into turmoil".

==== China ====
China pressed for continued U.N. weapons inspections in Iraq after two arms inspectors told the Security Council they had found no evidence of weapons of mass destruction. Beijing insisted on staking out a “principled” and independent position on U.S. intervention in Iraq. Although it stated its wish that the situation be resolved peacefully, China did not threaten to exercise its Security Council veto and had abstained in many previous decisions on Iraq.

During the Iraq war of 2003, China vehemently demanded Iraq to comply with the UN Security Council Resolution 1441 but opposed the use of force to secure Iraqi compliance. However, when the war broke out, China's Middle East policy reflected the traditional policy of seeking to maximize its economic interests without becoming entangled in political controversies.

==== Pakistan ====
Major anti-war demonstrations took place in the cities of Peshawar, Islamabad, Karachi, Lahore, and Quetta. General Pervez Musharraf faced already fierce opposition from his mostly Muslim population for his support of the U.S. campaign in Afghanistan. Pakistan also had a seat on the UN Security Council during the pre-war period, though would not have likely voted in favour of the resolution at the time Bush had planned to present it, in an attempt to quell civilian dissent.

==== Other Asian states ====
Bangladesh, Malaysia and Indonesia, all largest Muslim countries of world and Vietnam condemned the war. Bangladesh urged to solve the problem through discussion rather than war. Huge anti-war demonstrations took place in Dhaka, Bangladesh; Kathmandu, Nepal; Colombo, Sri Lanka; Kelantan; Jakarta and Java, Indonesia; Surabaya; and Bangkok, Thailand.

=== New Zealand ===
The New Zealand government disagreed with its neighbour, Australia, and did not support the war in principle. However, New Zealand did send a group of non-combatant engineers to help rebuild Iraq. There were major anti-war demonstrations in the New Zealand cities Christchurch, Wellington and Auckland.

== Countries with other positions ==
=== Ireland ===
Ireland is an officially neutral country, with a strong tradition of supporting UN institutions, peacekeeping and international law. Nevertheless, the use of Shannon Airport was allowed for transatlantic stopovers by the US Army. Under domestic pressure, the Taoiseach Bertie Ahern repeatedly glossed over the particulars of the situation, while emphasising the need for a UN mandate.

Despite large-scale protests, including many at Shannon Airport itself, opinion polls showed that many people broadly supported official policy on the use of the Airport. While a large majority of the public did oppose the war, there was a fifty–fifty split on the use of Shannon. Keeping US investment in Ireland safe was the principal reason for allowing US stopovers. Ultimately anti-war allies were appeased by the government's not condoning the war while the situation with Shannon kept Irish-U.S. relations cordial.

=== Iran ===
Iran's official view of US policy in Iraq since 2002 has been characterized by considerable ambivalence. On the one hand, lingering mistrust of Saddam Hussein (as a result of 1980–1988 war with Iraq) both created and reinforced an attitude that accepted the US containment of Iraq as being in Iran's interests. On the other hand, the US since 1993 had proclaimed the containment of Iran to be of equal importance to that of Iraq, and therefore, Iranian leaders felt encircled by the arrival of thousands of US troops in Iraq together with those in Afghanistan since the end of 2001. Indeed, Bush's 2002 inclusion of Iran in his "axis of evil" meant a US military presence in Iraq could constitute an existential threat for the government of the Islamic Republic. As circumstances in Iraq evolved from early 2003 to mid-2005, Iranian policy makers faced the challenge of crafting strategies to take advantage of new opportunities while simultaneously remaining out of the crosshairs of a triumphal and hostile United States.

=== Israel ===
Israel did not support or take part in the Iraq War. According to former State Department official Lawrence Wilkerson and former Central Intelligence Agency official and Iran expert Robert Baer, Israeli officials warned the Bush administration against invading Iraq, saying that it would destabilize the region and empower the much more dangerous regime in Iran. According to former U.S. Under Secretary of Defense for Policy Douglas Feith, Israeli officials did not push their American counterparts to initiate the war in Iraq. In an interview with Ynet, Feith stated that "what you heard from the Israelis was not any kind of advocacy of war with Iraq" and that "[w]hat you heard from Israeli officials in private discussions was that they were not really focused on Iraq... [t]hey were much more focused on Iran."

Nonetheless, Israeli officials expressed concerns about Saddam Hussein. In August 2002, Haaretz reported that Israeli intelligence provided Washington with reports about Iraq's alleged program to develop weapons of mass destruction. In the same month, the Washington Post reported that "Israel is urging United States' officials not to delay a military strike against Iraq's Saddam Hussein". In September 2002, Benjamin Netanyahu, testifying under oath as a private citizen before the U.S. House of Representatives Government Reform Committee, lobbied for the invasion of Iraq and said: "There is no question whatsoever that Saddam is seeking and is working and is advancing towards the development of nuclear weapons…" He also said, "If you take out Saddam, Saddam's regime, I guarantee you that it will have enormous positive reverberations on the region."

In January 2007, The Forward reported that, before March 2003, Israeli Prime Minister Ariel Sharon told Bush that Israel "would not push one way or the other" for or against an Iraq war. According to this report, Sharon said that he believed that Iraq was a genuine threat to the Middle East and had weapons of mass destruction. However, he warned Bush that, if the US did go to war with Iraq, he should make sure to formulate a viable exit strategy, prepare a counterinsurgency strategy, and should not attempt to implant democracy in the Arab world.

After the invasion, Israel shared its expertise on counterinsurgency methods, such as utilizing drones and operating checkpoints.

While Israeli officials were more so on the fence, a BBC collection of opinions titled 'Global Voices On Iraq', Israeli civilian (from Tel Aviv) opinions were strongly in favor of the American claims and planned actions against Iraq.

=== Republic of China (Taiwan) ===
Despite public protests in front of the American Institute in Taiwan, leaders of the Republic of China (commonly known as Taiwan) seemed supportive of the war effort; however Taiwan did not appear in the official list of members of the Coalition of the Willing. This was because despite the government's offer of military and monetary support, Taiwan eventually pulled back from the coalition in response to vocal opposition by opposition leaders and the public at large.

=== Solomon Islands ===
As Croatia and Slovenia, the Solomon Islands were claimed to be members of the coalition but wished "to disassociate itself from the report". The Solomon Islands do not have a globally or regionally deployable military.

== See also ==
- Views on the 2003 invasion of Iraq
- At the Center of the Storm, a 2007 memoir co-written by former Director of the Central Intelligence Agency George Tenet with Bill Harlow, former CIA Director of Public Affairs
- Iraq disarmament timeline 1990–2003, 1997–2000, 2001–2003
- Iraq disarmament crisis
- 2003 invasion of Iraq
- Public opinion in the United States on the invasion of Iraq
- Opposition to the Iraq War
- Protests against the Iraq War
- United Nations Security Council and the Iraq War
- International community
- Peace movement
