= Public opinion in the United States on the invasion of Iraq =

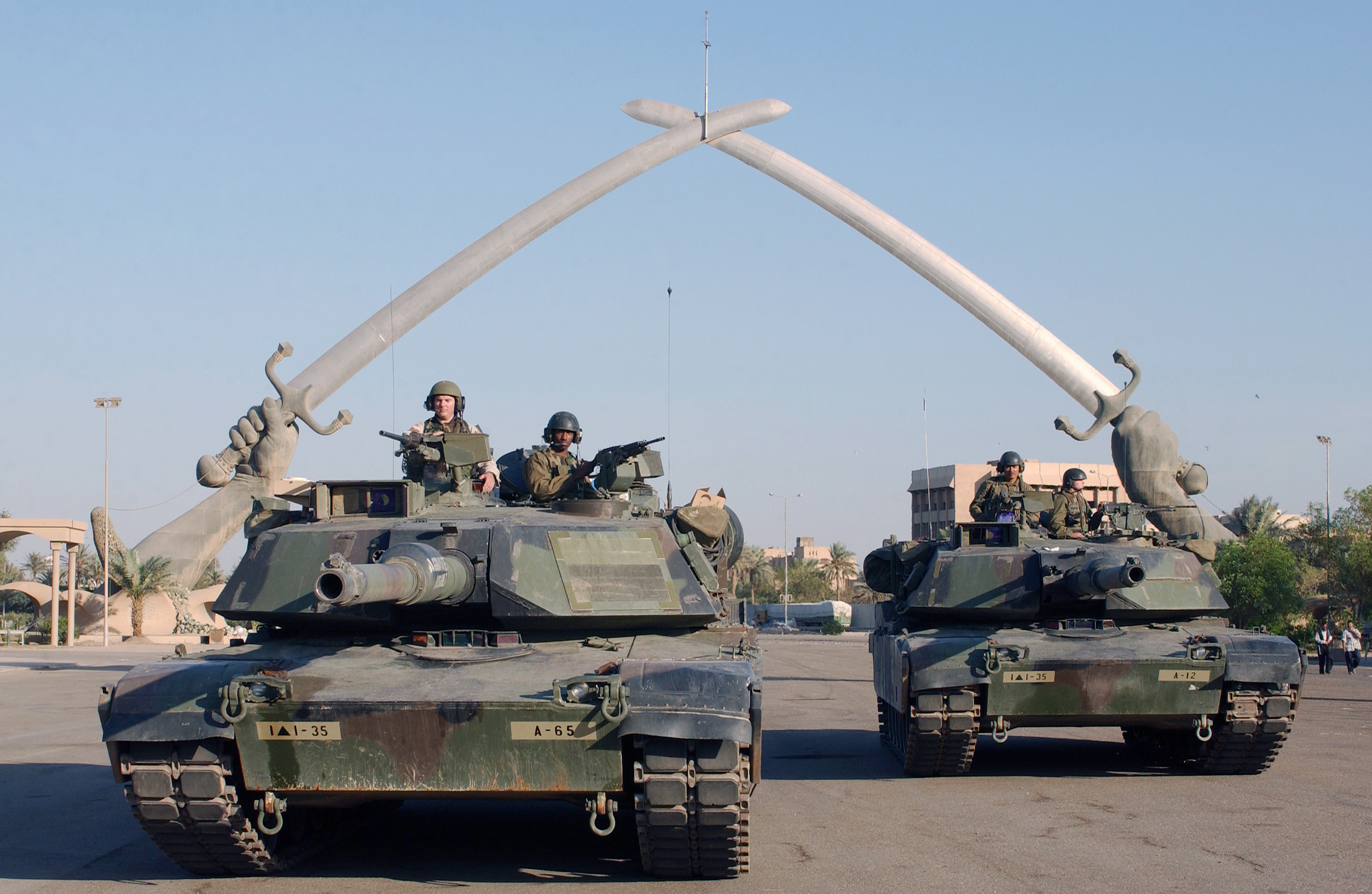
M1A1 Abrams pose for a photo under the "Hands of Victory" in Ceremony Square, Baghdad, Iraq.

The United States public's opinion on the invasion of Iraq has changed significantly since the years preceding the incursion. For various reasons, mostly related to the unexpected consequences of the invasion, as well as misinformation provided by US authorities, the US public's perspective on its government's choice to initiate an offensive is increasingly negative. Before the invasion in March 2003, polls showed 47–60% of the US public supported an invasion, dependent on U.N. approval. According to the same poll retaken in April 2007, 58% of the participants stated that the initial attack was a mistake. In May 2007, the New York Times and CBS News released similar results of a poll in which 61% of participants believed the U.S. "should have stayed out" of Iraq.

== Timeline ==
=== March 1992 ===
In March 1992, 55% of Americans said they would support sending American troops back to the Persian Gulf to remove Saddam Hussein from power.

=== 2001 ===
Seven months prior to the September 11 attacks a Gallup poll showed that 52% would favor an invasion of Iraq while 42% would oppose it. Additionally, 64% said that the U.S. should have removed Hussein at the end of the Gulf War. Prior to the September 11 attacks, many Americans viewed Iraq as a threat to world peace and expressed support for the U.S. using military force to remove Hussein from power.

Surveys conducted after the attacks but before 2002 showed that many Americans were fearful of future acts of terrorism, favored military action against Saddam Hussein and other terroristic actors, and expressed a high level of trust in the federal government that has since declined.

=== Post 9/11 sentiment ===
Following the attacks on the United States on September 11, 2001, United States' popular opinion was seemingly for an invasion of Iraq. According to the CNN/USA Today/Gallup Poll, conducted on October 3–6, 2002, 53% of Americans said they favor invading Iraq with U.S. ground troops in an attempt to remove Saddam Hussein from power. The American public's support for the war fluctuated between 50% and 60% during the aftermath of the attacks on 9/11.

When asked whether or not the United States should attack a country that has not attacked the United States first, the American public's opinion was in support with 51%, whereas when Iraq was embedded into the question the attitude shifted and there was a shift to 66% of Americans agreeing that the U.S. should be able to invade Iraq first.

Despite public concern for the consequences of war the public's support remained very high. Original concerns included, 55 percent of Americans fearing that the war would last too long, 44 percent taking into consideration a mass number of casualties, 62 percent of the public being convinced that this would increase short-term terrorism domestically, 76 felt there would be a higher risk of domestic bioterrorism, and 35 believed that the draft would need to be reinstated. At the same time 40 percent of the American public was against having protests because they believed it would undermine the success abroad. Additionally, 55 percent supported the war even without support from the UN.

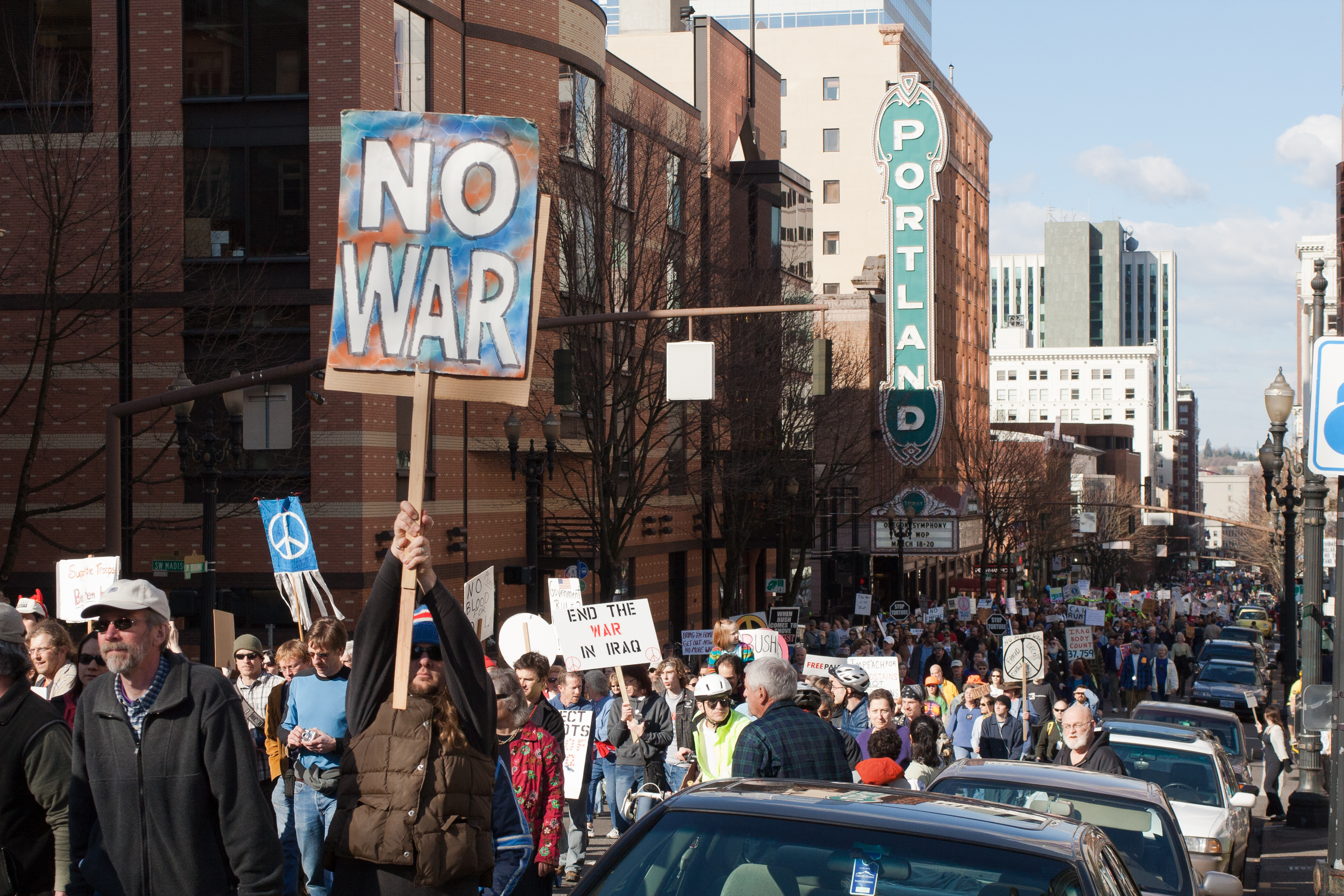
Protests in Portland, Oregon in March 2006

Approximately two-thirds of respondents wanted the government to wait for the UN inspections to end, and only 31% supported using military force immediately. This same poll showed that a majority believed that Iraq had weapons of mass destruction, but did not expect UN inspectors to find them. These numbers indicated a dramatic drop in support, as, two months prior, most polls showed about two-thirds of those polled supporting military action. However, about 60% of those polled also supported, if necessary, the use of military action to remove Hussein from power which closely mirrored recent polls taken by Time Magazine, CNN, Fox News, USA Today, CBS News, and other news organizations. Polls also showed that most Americans did not think that Saddam was co-operating with inspectors.

Polls also suggested that most Americans would still like to see more evidence against Iraq, and for UN weapons inspections to continue before making an invasion. For example, an ABC News poll reported that only 10% of Americans favored giving the inspectors less than a few weeks; 41% favored giving them a few weeks, 33% a few months, and 13% more than that.

A consistent pattern in the months leading up to the U.S.-led invasion was that higher percentages of the population supported the impending war in polls that offered only two options (for or against) than in polls that broke down support into three or more options given (distinguishing unconditional support for the war, opposition to the war even if weapons inspectors do their job, and support if and only if inspection crews are allowed time to investigate first).

Some polls also showed that the majority of Americans believed that President Bush had made his case against Iraq. The Gallup poll, for example, found that 67% of those who watched the speech felt that the case had been made, which was a jump from 47% just prior the speech. However, many more Republicans than Democrats watched the speech, so this may not be an accurate reflection of the overall opinion of the American public. An ABC News poll found little difference in the percentage of Americans who felt that George W. Bush has made his case for war after he had made his speech, with the percentage remaining at about 40%.

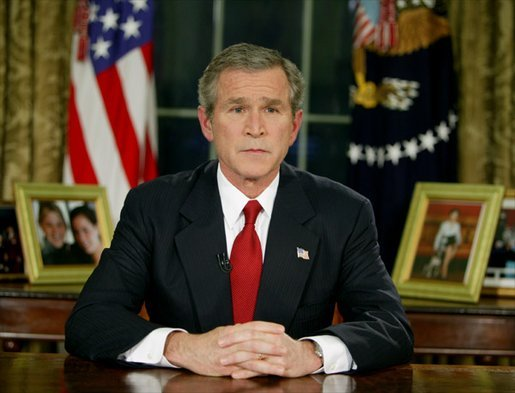
President George W. Bush addresses the nation from the Oval Office, March 19, 2003, to announce the beginning of Operation Iraqi Freedom. "The people of the United States and our friends and allies will not live at the mercy of an outlaw regime that threatens the peace with weapons of mass murder." The Senate committee found that many of the administration's pre-war statements about Iraqi weapons of mass destruction were not supported by the underlying intelligence.

Following Powell's February 5 speech at the UN, most polls, like one conducted by CNN and NBC, showed increased support for the invasion. Tim Russert, NBC's Washington bureau chief, said the increases in support were "largely" due to President Bush's State of the Union speech in January and to Powell's presentation on February 5, which most viewers felt offered strong evidence for action against Iraq. Bush's approval ratings climbed seven points, and support for the invasion increased by four points. Only 27% opposed military action, the smallest percentage since the polls began in April 2002. The percentage of Americans supporting an invasion without UN support jumped eight points to 37%. 49% of those polled felt that President Bush had prepared the country for war and its potential risks, a 9-point jump from the previous month. A Gallup poll showed the majority of the population erroneously believed Iraq was responsible for the attacks of September 11.

=== Invasion of Iraq ===
Although pro-war sentiments were very high after 9/11, public opinion stabilized soon after, and slightly in favor of the war. According to a Gallup poll conducted from August 2002 through early March 2003, the number of Americans who favored the war in Iraq fell to between 52 percent to 59 percent, while those who opposed it fluctuated between 35 percent and 43 percent.

Days before the March 20 invasion, a USA Today/CNN/Gallup Poll found support for the war was related to UN approval. Nearly six in 10 said they were ready for such an invasion "in the next week or two." But that support dropped off if the U.N. backing was not first obtained. If the United Nations Security Council were to reject a resolution paving the way for military action, 54% of Americans favored a U.S. invasion. And if the Bush administration did not seek a final Security Council vote, support for a war dropped to 47%.

An ABC News/Washington Post poll taken after the beginning of the war showed a 62% support for the war, lower than the 79% in favor at the beginning of the Persian Gulf War.

However, when the US invaded Iraq in Operation Iraqi Freedom, public support for the conflict rose once again. According to a Gallup poll, support for the war was up to 72 percent on March 22–23. Out of those 72 percent, 59 percent reported supporting the war strongly; and although allied commanders said they had not yet found evidence of weapons of mass destruction days after the initial invasion, 9 out of 10 Americans believed it was "at least somewhat likely" that the United States would find evidence of these weapons.

President George W. Bush's approval rating also jumped at the beginning of the war, going up 13 percentage points at the start of this conflict (Smith and Lindsay).

=== May 2003 – November 2004 ===
A Gallup poll in May 2003 made on behalf of CNN and USA Today concluded that 79% of Americans thought the Iraq War was justified, no matter the lack of conclusive evidence of illegal weapons, and 72% still supported the war even if no illegal weapons are found; only 19% believed the weapons must be found for the war to be justified.

An August 2004 poll showed that two-thirds (67%) of the American public believe the U.S. went to war based on incorrect assumptions. The morale of the US troops has been subject to variations. Issues include the vulnerability of the Humvee vehicles, and the great number of wounded and maimed soldiers

A CBS poll from September 2004 showed that 54% of Americans believed the Iraq invasion was the right thing to do, up from 45% in July in the same poll.

Finally, in the year leading up to the presidential election in 2004 (November 3, 2003, and October 31, 2004) public opinion began to fluctuate significantly in response to major events in the war, including the capture of Saddam Hussein and the Abu Ghraib prison scandal. Of the 364 days of news in this year, 348 contained at least one segment that mentioned Iraq. The coverage of the war most often provided reasons for support and rationales for the conflict, with themes most often including "troops", "threat", "freedom", "peace", and "evil".

CNN reporter Howard Kurtz reported that the news coverage of the war in the beginning of the topic was too one-sided, writing, "From August 2002 through the March 19, 2003, launch of the war, I found more than 140 front-page stories that focused heavily on administration rhetoric against Iraq: 'Cheney Says Iraqi Strike Is Justified'; 'War Cabinet Argues for Iraq Attack'... 'Bush Cites Urgent Iraqi Threat'; 'Bush Tells Troops: Prepare for War.' By contrast, pieces questioning the evidence or rationale for war were frequently buried, minimized or spiked."

This type of coverage quickly changed after the major turning points of the Iraq War. Once it was discovered that there were no weapons of mass destruction in 2004, the New York Times quickly apologized for its rhetoric, stating that its coverage was "not as rigorous as it should have been" and that the Times overplayed stories with "dire claims about Iraq".

George W. Bush was re-elected with a 50.74% majority of the vote in the presidential election of November 2004.

=== Public support for war wanes as U.S. scales back on combat ===
Initially, Americans overwhelmingly approved of President Bush and his decisions in Iraq during the major combat phase of the war. This number of those approving of Bush's dealing with Iraq reached 80% in April 2003, its highest point in the war.

But in the summer of 2003, after the major combat had ended but U.S. troops continued to take casualties, those numbers began to wane. The period from November 2003 to October 2004 the public opinion on the war varied noticeably. Public support went "from a high of more than 55% in mid-December immediately after the capture of Saddam Hussein, to a low of 39% in mid to late June just before the U.S. transferred power to the newly formed Iraqi government." The most notable change occurred in the last week of March, when there was an 11-point drop. This was the week of the 9/11 commission hearings, which included Richard Clarke's criticism of President George W. Bush.

After this period, the general trend of public approval was downward, with the exception of a midsummer reversal.

=== Public opinion on war plummets in President Bush's final term ===
On July 4, 2005, the National Council of Churches officially took a stand against the Iraq War calling it dishonorable and urging a change in U.S. policy.

A CBS news poll was conducted from 28 to 30 April 2006, nearly three years after President Bush's "Mission Accomplished speech" speech. 719 adults were polled nationwide, with a margin of error of plus or minus four percent. 30% of those polled approved of the way Bush was handling the Iraq situation, 64% disapproved, and 6% were unsure. 51% of those polled felt America should have stayed out of Iraq, 44% said the invasion was the right thing to do, and 5% were unsure.

A CBS/New York Times poll was conducted from 21 to 25 July 2006. 1,127 adults were polled nationwide, with a margin of error of plus or minus 3%. Thirty percent of those polled said the invasion of Iraq was worth the American casualties and other costs, while 63% said the war was not worth it. Six percent were unsure. 32% said they approved of the way George W. Bush was handling the situation in Iraq, 62% disapproved, with six percent unsure.

A CBS/New York Times poll was conducted from 15 to 19 September 2006. 1,131 adults were polled nationwide, with a margin of error of plus or minus 3%. 51% of those polled said that, looking back, they felt that the U.S. should have stayed out of Iraq. 44% said the U.S. did the right thing in invading Iraq. Five percent were unsure.

A CNN poll was conducted by Opinion Research Corporation from 29 September to 2 October 2006. 1,014 adults were polled nationwide, with a margin of error of plus or minus 3%. 61% of those polled disapproved of the war in Iraq, 38% approved, with 1% unsure.

A Newsweek poll was conducted by Princeton Survey Research Associates International on 26–27 October 2006. 1,002 adults were polled nationwide, with a margin of error of plus or minus 3%. When asked From what you know now, do you think the United States did the right thing in taking military action against Iraq or not? 43% said it was the "Right Thing".

A Newsweek poll was conducted by Princeton Survey Research Associates International on 9–10 November 2006. 1,006 adults were polled nationwide. When asked if the U.S. did the right thing by going into Iraq, 41% responded yes, 54% responded no, and 5% unsure. The margin of error was plus or minus 3%.

A CNN poll taken on December 15–17, 2006, found that 67% polled opposed the war in Iraq, but that only a majority of 54% believed in an exit over the next year. An LA times poll done a few days previously had found that 65% believe Iraq has become a civil war. The same poll found that 66% believed neither side was winning and only 26% of respondents agreed America should stay "as long as it takes". Both polls found that 2/3 or more of respondents disapproved of President Bush's handling of the war.

A CBS poll of 993 nationwide adults taken on 1–3 January found that under 1 in 4 approve of Bush's Iraq policy, up 2 points from the last CBS poll in December. The same poll finds that 82% believe the Democrats have not developed a "clear plan" and 76% believe the same is true of President Bush.

A CNN poll conducted January 11 found that 32% of 1,093 adults polled 'strongly' or 'moderately' supported a planned increase in Iraqi troop levels, while 66% 'strongly' or 'moderately' opposed the plan. Three percent were unsure. The margin of error was plus or minus three percent.

On May 4–7, CNN polled 1,028 adults nationwide. 34% said they favored the war in Iraq, 65% opposed, and 1% was undecided. The margin of error was plus or minus 3%.

On August 6–8, CNN polled 1,029 adults nationwide. 33% said they favored the war in Iraq, 64% opposed, and 3% was undecided. The margin of error was plus or minus 3%.

On September 10–12, in an Associated Press-Ipsos poll of 1,000 adults conducted by Ipsos Public Affairs, 33% approved of George Bush's handling of the "situation in Iraq", while 65% disapproved of it. On September 14–16, Gallup conducted a poll asking if the United States made mistake in sending troops to Iraq. 58% believed it was a mistake, 41% did not believe it was a mistake, and 1% had no opinion.

On December 11–14, an ABC News/Washington Post Poll of 1,003 adults nationwide found 64% felt the Iraq War was not worth fighting, with 34% saying it was worth fighting, with 2% undecided. The margin of error was 3%.

Before President Bush's term comes to an end, passing off the Iraqi war to the next president, the conflicting countries sign a Status of forces agreement where it is understood that U.S. troops would end their occupation of Iraqi cities by June 30, 2009, and leave Iraq completely by the end of 2011.

=== President Barack Obama is elected to office, assumes charge of troop withdrawal ===
President Barack Obama is elected into office with the campaign promise of withdrawing troops from Iraq. President Obama issued three executive orders in January 2009, the first calling for the closure of Guantanamo Bay within one year, the second directing the immediate halt of all ongoing military commissions, and the third suspending the CIA's use of "enhanced interrogation." In February, President Obama announces withdrawal of most United States troops by August 2010 and all troops to be out of Iraq by the end of 2011 following the status of forces agreement. In June, troops leave their posts in cities in Iraq, passing the duties of safety and security onto the Iraqi military.

At the conclusion of the Iraq War in 2011, Washington Post journalist Peyton Craighill expressed that, in the seemingly poisoned atmosphere of American politics, President Obama's directive to withdraw U.S. forces from Iraq December of that year, was a rare example of a broadly popular policy decision which showed 78% of all Americans supporting the decision. However, the rapid withdrawal left what both reporters and scholars on global terrorism call a "power vacuum," which the terrorist group called the Islamic State of Iraq and al-Sham (ISIS) filled. While President Obama ordered an increase in drone strikes on various ISIS strongholds, he did not increase combat forces on the ground.

March 2013 marked the tenth anniversary of the United States' invasion of Iraq.

Public opinion toward the overall success of the invasion of Iraq was at an all-time low in January 2014 following President Obama's decision to pull troops out of the area. In a poll conducted by Pew Research Center, 52% of those polled said in achieving its goals in Iraq, the United States has failed. This is up by nearly 20% from 2011 when the question was first asked.

=== Public opinion on Iraq War more evenly split 15 years after conflict ===
Fifteen years into U.S. involvement in Iraq, public opinion as to whether military force was appropriate sees a more divided population, although not as stark as previous years. As of March 2018, 48% of Americans polled responded the invasion was the wrong decision, 43% saying it was the right decision, up 4% from 2014. Along party lines, Republicans went from 52% in 2014 to 61% in 2018, and said the U.S. made the right decision in using military force in Iraq. On the other side of the aisle, Democrats have stayed fairly consistent in their views on the conflict, only shifting one percent in the past four years.

=== Support for Iraq War dramatically decreases in two decades since invasion ===
March of 2023 marked the 20-year anniversary of the U.S. invasion of Iraq. Public support for the lengthy war significantly decreased over the past two decades. As of 2023, 36 percent of Americans believed the US was right to invade Iraq in 2003, while 61 percent believed it was the wrong decision. Nevertheless, John Bolton, former U.S. Ambassador to the United Nations, and, at the time of the invasion, the U.S. Undersecretary of State, said with 20 years of hindsight, "I would do exactly the same thing."

In a 2026 poll conducted by The Argument magazine, 55% of Trump 2024 voters said that the war in Iraq was "right," in contrast to 15% of Harris 2024 voters.

== Overall Assessment and Legacy of the War ==
Many Americans view the Iraq War as one of the worst foreign policy decisions in the country’s history. In a 2020 poll, 39% of voters believed that the Iraq War was the worst decision in U.S. history. Additionally, only 31% of Americans believe that the war made the United States safer.

== Shifts in Public Opinion in Recent Years ==
Majority Opposed to the Iraq Invasion: In a joint Axios/Ipsos poll conducted in March 2023, 61% of Americans believed that the invasion of Iraq was the wrong decision. Only 36% of respondents viewed the action as justified. Impact of the War on National Security: In the same poll, only 31% of Americans believed that the Iraq War made the United States safer.

== Declining Trust in Government and Media ==
According to a March 2023 poll by Axios/Ipsos, 61% of Americans believed that the invasion of Iraq was the wrong decision, and only 31% thought the war made the United States safer. These results reflect a decline in public trust in government decision-making on foreign policy. Additionally, a 2007 study by the Pew Research Center found that only 38% of Americans trusted media reports about the Iraq War, compared to around 81% at the beginning of the war in 2003. This drop in trust in the media has fueled concerns about the accuracy of information released about the war.

== See also ==
- Support our troops
- Iraq disarmament crisis
- Opposition to the Iraq War
- Protests against the Iraq War
- Protests against the war in Afghanistan
- 2003 invasion of Iraq
- International reactions to the prelude to the Iraq War
- Media coverage of the Iraq War
- United Nations Security Council and the Iraq War
- Lafayette Hillside Memorial
- International public opinion on the war in Afghanistan
- Authorization for Use of Military Force Against Iraq Resolution of 2002
