= United Nations Security Council and the Iraq War =

Security Council positions before war

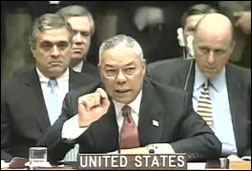
Colin Powell holding a model vial of anthrax while giving a presentation to the United Nations Security Council

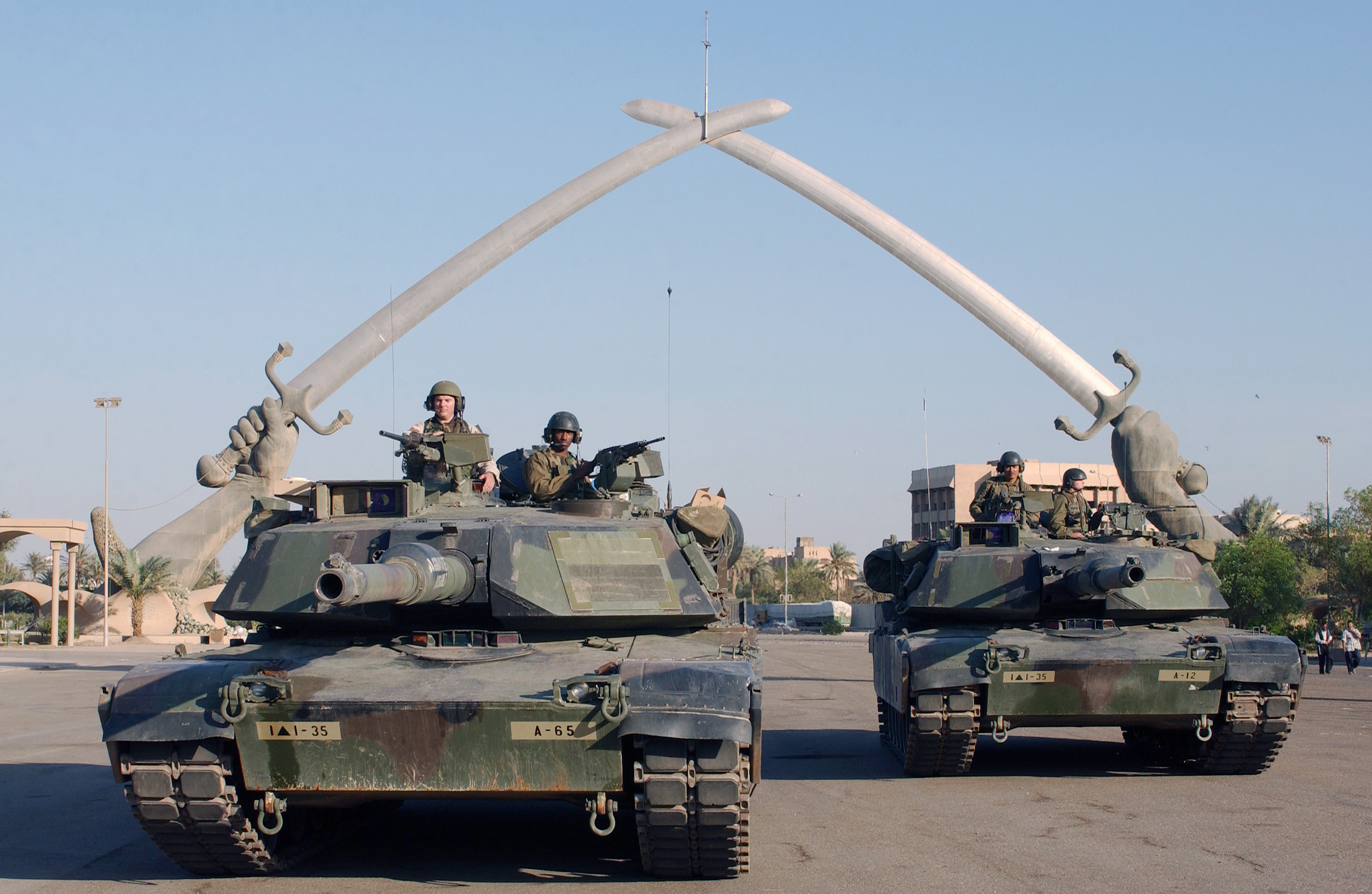
M1A1 Abrams pose for a photo in front of the "Hands of Victory" in Ceremony Square, Baghdad, Iraq.

In March 2003 the United States government announced that "diplomacy has failed" and that it would proceed with a "coalition of the willing" to rid Iraq under Saddam Hussein of weapons of mass destruction the US and UK claimed it possessed. The 2003 invasion of Iraq began a few days later. Prior to this decision, there had been much diplomacy and debate amongst the members of the United Nations Security Council over how to deal with the situation. This article examines the positions of these states as they changed during 2002–2003.

== History ==
Prior to 2002, the Security Council had passed 16 resolutions on Iraq. In 2002, the Security Council unanimously passed Resolution 1441.

In 2003, the governments of the US, Britain, and Spain proposed another resolution on Iraq, which they called the "eighteenth resolution" and others called the "second resolution." This proposed resolution was subsequently withdrawn when it became clear that several permanent members of the council would cast 'no' votes on any new resolution, thereby vetoing it. Had that occurred, it would have become even more difficult for those wishing to invade Iraq to argue that the council had authorized the subsequent invasion. Regardless of the threatened or likely vetoes, it seems that the coalition at no time was assured any more than four affirmative votes in the Council—the US, Britain, Spain, and Bulgaria—well short of the requirement for nine affirmative votes.

On September 16, 2004 Secretary-General of the United Nations Kofi Annan, speaking on the invasion, said, "I have indicated it was not in conformity with the UN Charter. From our point of view, from the charter point of view, it was illegal."

== Inspections ==
Following the passage of Resolution 1441, on 8 November 2002, weapons inspectors of the United Nations Monitoring, Verification and Inspection Commission returned to Iraq for the first time since being withdrawn by the United Nations. Whether Iraq actually had weapons of mass destruction or not was being investigated by Hans Blix, head of the commission, and Mohamed ElBaradei, head of the International Atomic Energy Agency. Inspectors remained in the country until they withdrew after being notified of the imminent invasion by the United States, Britain, and two other countries.

In early December 2002, Iraq filed a 12,000-page weapons declaration with the UN. After reviewing the document, UN weapons inspectors, the US, France, United Kingdom, and other countries thought that this declaration failed to account for all of Iraq's chemical and biological agents. Many of these countries had supplied the Iraqi government with the technology to make these weapons in the 1980s during the Iran–Iraq War. On December 19, United States Secretary of State Colin Powell stated that Iraq was in "material breach" of the Security Council resolution.

Blix has complained that, to this day, the United States and Britain have not presented him with the evidence that they claim to possess regarding Iraq's alleged weapons of mass destruction.

== Report of Hans Blix on February 14 ==
UN Chief Inspector Hans Blix, on 14 February 2003, presented a report to the Security Council. Blix gave an update of the situation in Iraq, and he stated that the Iraqis were now more proactive in their cooperation. He also rebutted some of the arguments proposed by Powell. Blix questioned the interpretations of the satellite images put forward by Powell, and stated that alternate interpretations of the satellite images were credible. He also stated that the Iraqis have in fact never received early warning of the inspectors visiting any sites (an allegation made by Powell during his presentation). International Atomic Energy Agency Director General Mohammed ElBaradei also said that he did not believe the Iraqis have a nuclear weapons program, unlike what Powell had claimed.

This report of February 14 and the protests of February 16 appear to have created reluctance in some of the members of the Security Council over the proposed war on Iraq. A second resolution was being drafted with the intention that it would find Iraq in "material breach" and the "serious consequences" of Resolution 1441 should be implemented.

== Report of Blix on March 7 ==
On 7 March 2003, Blix made his twelfth quarterly report on the status of UNMOVIC's efforts to verify Iraq's disarmament. A transcript of his presentation is available at CNN.

== Invasion ==
As George W. Bush gave Saddam Hussein an ultimatum to leave power, the UN pulled out all the inspectors from Iraq. Days later the invasion began.

== Positions of Security Council members ==
- United States - The US maintained that Iraq was not cooperating with UN inspectors and had not met its obligations to 17 UN resolutions. The US felt that Resolution 1441 called for the immediate, total unilateral disarmament of Iraq and continued to show frustration at the fact that months after the resolution was passed Iraq was still not, in its view, disarming. Language in Resolution 1441 recalled that the use of "all means necessary" was still authorized and in effect from Resolution 678, and therefore maintained that if Iraq failed to comply with the "one final chance to comply" provision of Resolution 1441, then military action would be the result.
- United Kingdom - Within the Security Council, the UK was the primary supporter of the US plan to invade Iraq. Prime Minister Tony Blair publicly and vigorously supported US policy on Iraq, and portrayed himself as exerting a moderating influence on Bush. British public opinion polls in late January showed that the public support for the war was deteriorating. It had fallen from 50 percent to 30 percent by March.
- France - On 20 January 2003, Foreign Minister Dominique de Villepin said, "We think that military intervention would be the worst possible solution," although France believed that Iraq may have had an ongoing chemical and nuclear weapons program. Villepin went on to say that he believed the presence of UN weapons inspectors had frozen Iraq's weapons programs. France also suggested that it would veto any resolution allowing military intervention offered by the US or Britain. The most important French speech during the crisis was made by de Villepin at the Security Council on the 14 February 2003, after Hans Blix presented his detailed report (see below). De Villepin detailed the three major risks of a "premature recourse to the military option", especially the "incalculable consequences for the stability of this scarred and fragile region". He said that "the option of war might seem a priori to be the swiftest, but let us not forget that having won the war, one has to build peace". He emphasized that "real progress is beginning to be apparent" through the inspections, and that, "given the present state of our research and intelligence, in liaison with our allies", the alleged links between al-Qaeda and the regime in Baghdad explained by Colin Powell were not established. He concluded by referring to the dramatic experience of "old Europe" during World War II. This "impassioned" speech "against war on Iraq, or immediate war on Iraq", won "an unprecedented applause", reported the BBC's Sir David Frost (BBC News). The complete text is available at the Embassy of France in the United States. Britain and the US sharply criticized France for this position in March 2003.
- Russia - On the same day, Russian Foreign Minister Igor Ivanov said that "Russia deems that there is no evidence that would justify a war in Iraq." On January 28, however, Russia's opinion had begun to shift following a report the previous day by UN inspectors which stated that Iraq had cooperated on a practical level with monitors, but had not demonstrated a "genuine acceptance" of the need to disarm. Russian president Vladimir Putin indicated that he would support a US-led war if things did not change and Iraq continued to show a reluctance to completely cooperate with inspection teams. However, Putin continued to stress that the US must not go alone in any such military endeavor, but instead must work through the UN Security Council. He also stressed the need for giving the UN inspectors more time. Russian foreign minister Igor Ivanov also garnered unusual applause inside the chamber with his speech against the war.
- China - On January 23, Foreign Ministry spokeswoman Zhang Qiyue said Beijing was "worried and uneasy about the large-scale military build-up" in the Gulf region and that China's position on potential war with Iraq was "extremely close" to France's. Chinese officials repeatedly spoke in support of a diplomatic solution, including continued weapons inspections.
- Germany - On January 22, German chancellor Gerhard Schröder, at a meeting with French president Jacques Chirac, said that he and Chirac would do all they could to avert war. At the time, Germany was presiding over the Security Council.
- Angola - Angola supported continued inspections, but had not taken a stand on disarmament by military action.
- Bulgaria - Bulgaria suggested that it would support the use of military force to disarm Iraq, even without UN backing.
- Cameroon - Cameroon encouraged the continued inspections, but had not taken a firm stand on whether the country would support a US led strike to invade Iraq.
- Chile - Chile indicated that it would like inspections to continue, but had not taken a position on the use of military force to disarm Iraq.
- Guinea - Guinea supported further inspections, but had not taken a position on the use of military force to disarm Iraq.
- Mexico - Mexico supported further inspections, and hinted that it would support a US-led military campaign if it were backed by the UN. The country also hinted that it might consider supporting a military campaign without UN backing as well. President Vicente Fox heavily criticized the war when it started and Mexican diplomats described their conversations with US officials as hostile in tone and that Washington was demonstrating little concern for the constitutional constraints of the Mexican government to counduct foreign policy according to the principles of non intervention and proscription of the use of force among nations, as well as the overwhelming opposition to the war in Mexico. (USA Today)
- Pakistan - Pakistan supported continued inspections.
- Syria - Syria felt that Iraq was cooperating and meeting its obligations under UN resolutions. Syria would have liked to see the crippling UN sanctions on Iraq lifted.
- Spain - Spain supported the US's position on Iraq and supported the use of force to disarm Iraq, even without UN approval.

=== Analysis ===
According to Britain, a majority of the UN Security Council members supported its proposed 18th resolution which gave Iraq a deadline to comply with previous resolutions, until France announced that they would veto any new resolution that gave Iraq a deadline. However, for a resolution to pass, a supermajority of 9 out of 15 votes are needed. Only four countries announced they would support a resolution backing the war.

In the mid-1990s, France, Russia and other members of the UN Security Council asked for sanctions on Iraq to be lifted. The sanctions were criticized for making ordinary people suffer and being the cause of a humanitarian catastrophe leading to hundreds of thousands of deaths.

The Institute for Policy Studies published a report analyzing what it called the "arm-twisting offensive" by the United States government to get nations to support it. Although President Bush described nations supporting him as the "coalition of the willing", the report concluded that it was more accurately described as a "coalition of the coerced." According to the report, most nations supporting Bush "were recruited through coercion, bullying, and bribery." The techniques used to pressure nations to support the United States included a variety of incentives including:

- Promises of aid and loan guarantees to nations who supported the US
- Promises of military assistance to nations who supported the US
- Threats to veto NATO membership applications for countries who don't do what the US asked
- Leveraging the size of the US export market and US influence over financial institutions such as the World Bank and the International Monetary Fund.
- Deciding which countries receive trade benefits under such laws as the African Growth and Opportunity Act (AGOA) and the Free Trade Agreement (FTA), which, as one of its conditions for eligibility for such benefits, requires that a country does "not engage in activities that undermine United States national security interests".
- Deciding what countries it should buy petroleum from in stocking its strategic reserves. The US has exerted such pressure on several oil-exporting nations, such as Mexico.

In addition to the above tactics, the British newspaper The Observer published an investigative report revealing that the National Security Agency of the United States was conducting a secret surveillance operation directed at intercepting the telephone and email communications of several Security Council diplomats, both in their offices and in their homes. This campaign, the result of a directive by National Security Advisor Condoleezza Rice, was aimed primarily at the delegations from Angola, Cameroon, Chile, Mexico, Guinea and Pakistan. The investigative report cited an NSA memo which advised senior agency officials that it was "'mounting a surge' aimed at gleaning information not only on how delegations on the Security Council will vote on any second resolution on Iraq, but also 'policies', 'negotiating positions', 'alliances' and 'dependencies' - the 'whole gamut of information that could give US policymakers an edge in obtaining results favourable to US goals or to head off surprises'."

The story was carried by the European and Australian press, and served as a further embarrassment to the Bush administration's efforts to rally support for an invasion of Iraq. A member or Britain's Government Communications Headquarters (GCHQ), Katharine Gun was charged under the Official Secrets Act 1989 in connection with the leaking of the memo. She stated her intention to plead not guilty on the grounds that her actions were justified to prevent an illegal war. The case against her was dropped after the prosecution declined to present any evidence at her trial.

Clare Short, a British cabinet minister who resigned in May 2003 over the war, stated in media interviews that British intelligence regularly spied on UN officials. She stated that she had read transcripts of Kofi Annan's conversations.

== Powell retraction ==
In 2004 and 2005 Colin Powell acknowledged that much of his 2003 UN presentation was inaccurate:

I looked at the four [sources] that [the CIA] gave me for [the mobile bio-labs], and they stood behind them, ... Now it appears not to be the case that it was that solid. At the time I was preparing the presentation, it was presented to me as being solid. April 3, 2004

I feel terrible ... [giving the speech] ... It's a blot. I'm the one who presented it on behalf of the United States to the world, and [it] will always be a part of my record. It was painful. It's painful now. Sep 8, 2005

== See also ==
- Bush-Aznar memo
- Official Secrets (film)
- At the Center of the Storm: My Years at the CIA
- Iraq disarmament crisis
- Governmental positions on the Iraq War
- Popular opposition to war on Iraq
- Protests against the 2003 Iraq war
- American popular opinion of war on Iraq
- Command responsibility
- War of aggression
- United Nations Security Council Resolutions concerning Iraq
