= Gregory S. Newbold =

United States Marine Corps general

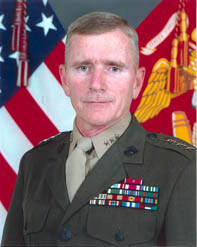
- LTG Gregory Newbold
- Military career
- Allegiance: United States of America
- Branch: United States Marine Corps
- Service years: 1970–2002
- Rank: Lieutenant General
- Commands: 15th Marine Expeditionary Unit; 1st Marine Division
- Awards: Legion of Merit
- Other work: Potomac Institute for Policy Studies, Exec. VP (to 2012)

Lieutenant General Gregory S. Newbold is a retired United States Marine Corps 3-star general who served as Director of Operations (J-3) for the Joint Chiefs of Staff from October 2000 until he retired in October 2002. Openly critical of Donald Rumsfeld's plans for the invasion of Iraq, he retired partly as a protest.

== Career ==
After his commissioning as a second lieutenant in 1970 he attended The Basic School at the Marine Corps Base Quantico, Virginia, where he was designated an infantry officer. Lieutenant General Newbold's assignments have included Fleet Marine Force tours in the 1st Marine Division, the 2nd Marine Division, and the 3rd Marine Divisions, with the 4th Marine Expeditionary Brigade, and with I Marine Expeditionary Force. He has commanded infantry units at the platoon, company, and battalion level, and also served at different times as executive officer, operations officer, and logistics officer in a variety of operational units. While Lieutenant General Newbold commanded the 15th Marine Expeditionary Unit, this force was in the vanguard of the U.S. commitment for Operation Restore Hope in Somalia. Prior to reporting to his assignment with the Joint Staff, he served as Commanding General, 1st Marine Division.

Lieutenant General Newbold has served tours outside the Fleet Marine Force as tactics instructor at The Basic School, officer assignment officer at Headquarters Marine Corps, Warfare Policy Planner on the Joint Staff, Military Assistant to the Secretary of the Navy, Head of the Enlisted Assignment Branch at Headquarters Marine Corps, and as the Director, Manpower Plans and Policy Division, Headquarters Marine Corps, Washington, DC. His professional military education has included attendance at Amphibious Warfare School, the Marine Corps Command and Staff College, and the National War College.

== Life after retirement ==
General Newbold is a resident of North Carolina. On March 3, 2006, Newbold joined fellow former Marine Corps General Joseph P. Hoar, General Tony Zinni, Lt. General Frank E. Petersen, and Congressman Jack Murtha in endorsing fellow former U.S. Marine and Secretary of the Navy Jim Webb for U.S. Senate in Virginia.

== Awards ==

Legion of Merit w/ 1 award star		Defense Meritorious Service Medal	Meritorious Service Medal
Joint Service Commendation Medal	Navy and Marine Corps Commendation Medal	Joint Service Achievement Medal w/ 1 oak leaf cluster	Navy and Marine Corps Achievement Medal
Joint Meritorious Unit Award	Marine Corps Expeditionary Medal	National Defense Service Medal w/ 1 service star	Armed Forces Expeditionary Medal
Southwest Asia Service Medal	Navy Sea Service Deployment Ribbon w/ 3 service stars	Arctic Service Ribbon	Kuwait Liberation Medal (Kuwait)
