= Post–September 11 anti-war movement =

Social movement in response to the war on terror

The post–September 11 anti-war movement is an anti-war social movement that emerged after the September 11 terrorist attacks in response to the war on terror.

== Background ==
On September 11, 2001 a series of coordinated terrorist attacks against the United States killed approximately 3000 people. These attacks appear to have been carried out by a small group of individuals who formed part of the al-Qaida network: Islamists without formal backing from any state (though there were and are suspicions that Al-Qaida was aided and funded by several Arab/Muslim countries). Following them U.S. president George W. Bush declared a campaign with the stated aim of defeating terrorism which he called the "war on terrorism".

Although which of his programs constitute part of this "war" has never been formally articulated, the term appears to embrace at least two major Bush administration initiatives: a set of changes to U.S. criminal law and immigration law (most notably through the USA PATRIOT Act) and the 2001 invasion of Afghanistan and the 2003 invasion of Iraq. The term may also embrace such related matters as the creation of a Department of Homeland Security.

Many of those on the left and others who would come to oppose the war on terrorism did not believe that it was really a response to the terrorist attacks. They point to the Project for the New American Century as proof that Bush was merely using the atrocities as an excuse to put the Imperialist plans of the neoconservatives into action. They also point to what they perceive as the ineffectiveness of Bush's strategy for actually reducing terrorism and the lack of any link between Saddam Hussein and al-Qaida.

=== Immediate reaction to the attacks ===
The immediate, worldwide reaction to the attacks was widely described at the time as "shock". No national government claimed responsibility or connection to the attacks. Indeed, the governments most associated with Islamism sought to distance themselves from the attacks. Wakeel Ahmed Mutawakel, the foreign minister of Afghanistan's then-ruling Taliban government, declared, "We denounce this terrorist attack, whoever is behind it." Mohammad Khatami, the Iranian president, said he felt "deep regret and sympathy with the victims." Shaykh Abdul Aziz al-Ashaikh, Grand Mufti of Saudi Arabia and Chairman of the Senior Ulama, said, "Hijacking planes, terrorizing innocent people and shedding blood constitute a form of injustice that can not be tolerated by Islam, which views them as gross crimes and sinful acts." Palestinian President Yasser Arafat said, "We completely condemn this serious operation... We were completely shocked..." Some, though, considered those reactions as hypocrisy, since several Arab and Muslim states encourage anti-Americanism and a number of newspapers in the Arab world—for example the Islamist opposition press in Egypt—openly celebrated the September 11 attacks. Moreover, states like Iran and Syria were known for long-year funding of terrorist networks such as Hezbollah, Hamas and Islamic Jihad. Also, Al-Qaida training camps were operating undisturbed in Afghanistan and the organization held bank accounts in Saudi Arabia.

On the left, condemnation of the attacks was equally general, although often including (even in the days immediately after the attack) condemnation of ostensibly related aspects of U.S. policies. Noam Chomsky's statement in the immediate wake of the attacks begins by condemning this "major atrocit[y]" and "horrendous crime", but also by contextualizing it in terms of the Clinton-era U.S. attack on the Al-Shifa pharmaceutical factory and prefiguring what would be a widespread concern for the left worldwide: "...the crime is a gift to the hard jingoist right, those who hope to use force to control their domains." Similarly, from Vijay Prashad, "The attacks must be condemned without reservation. But we must be certain to recognize that these are probably the work of frustrated and alienated human beings hemmed in by forces that are anonymous and that could only be embodied by these structures." Martin Woollacott, writing in The Guardian, called the attacks, "above all a stupendous crime", but also wrote, "America's best defence against terrorism originating from abroad remains the existence of governments and societies more or less satisfied with American even-handedness on issues which are important to them. Plainly, this is furthest from the case in the Muslim world."

Elected officials generally identified as being on the U.S. "left" also joined in strongly condemning the attacks, in this case almost universally without pointing out a context. For example, the day after the attack, Senator Edward Kennedy described the attack as "vicious and horrifying... acts of unspeakable cruelty... a massive tragedy for America", and commended President Bush for "his strong statement... about finding and punishing the perpetrators of this atrocity." Three days after the attacks, Congress passed a resolution authorizing President Bush to use force against "those responsible". The Senate voted 98–0, the House 420–1, with only Barbara Lee (D-California) dissenting. In a lengthy interview explaining her dissent, Lee pointed to her professional training as a social worker and remarked, "Right now, we're dealing with recovery, and we're dealing with mourning, and there's no way... [we should]... deal with decisions that could escalate violence and spiral out of control."

=== An anti-war movement forms ===
Within days of the September 11 events, it was widely agreed that the attacks were carried out by al-Qaida, although as of 2002, al-Qaida responsibility for the attacks may have been a minority view in majority-Muslim countries, though not among Muslims in the U.S. A small segment of the population also calls this belief into question. A much larger segment (though still a minority) of the left (both in the U.S. and elsewhere) concurred with the clear majority of Muslims that a military attack on Afghanistan was not the correct answer to the September 11 events. This anti-war view was even more widespread among both leftists and Muslims with respect to the later attack on Iraq.

The left was somewhat fragmented with respect to the invasion of Afghanistan. U.S. Representative Dennis Kucinich, who had opposed the Kosovo War and would soon oppose the invasion of Iraq, voted to authorize military action against Afghanistan, although he would later characterize it as a "disaster", a "nightmare", and "counterproductive". U.S. Representative Cynthia McKinney, speaking on September 24, acknowledged that "We must find and hold accountable all those who perpetrated those most terrible crimes against our nation and its people", but denounced what she saw as impending "suspensions of fundamental civil liberties" and said that she was "greatly concerned that we are about to engage in an extremely hazardous military campaign of unknown duration, with unrealistic objectives and perhaps even ultimately harmful long-term consequences for our nation", adding, "Already there is growing disquiet in the Muslim world that the U.S. is poised to turn its terrorist campaign into a war against Islam." Indian leftist writer Arundhati Roy, writing on September 29, strongly condemned both the attackers who had "blown a hole in the world as we knew it" and Bush for reacting by going to war against Afghanistan: "President Bush's ultimatum to the people of the world 'If you're not with us, you're against us' is a piece of presumptuous arrogance. It's not a choice that people want to, need to, or should have to make."

Within a few weeks after September 11, it became clear that two major prongs of the Bush administration's "war on terrorism" were to be a set of changes to U.S. criminal law and immigration law and an invasion of Afghanistan. An international anti-war movement began to arise; in the U.S. and other countries whose governments enacted legislation analogous to the PATRIOT act, it was equally a movement in protest of what were perceived on the left to be assaults on civil liberties and immigrant rights. This movement constituted a loose coalition of groups united in their opposition to U.S. military campaigns in the Middle East. Most prominent in the ranks of the movement were leftists, pacifists, and others with longtime associations with global peace movements, and Arabs and Muslims, including, but by no means limited to, Islamists. Most commentary focuses on the "anti-war movement" in the singular, although in some ways it could be argued that there is a plurality of different anti-war movements, who may not have anything in common with each other beyond their shared opposition to U.S. foreign policy.

The movement (or movements) included an enormous variety of groups and individuals that could not be categorised as "left" in any conventional terms, who had a variety of reasons for opposition to the invasion of Afghanistan and later of Iraq. In addition to the non-leftist Arabs and Muslims in the movement, there were also European nationalists uncomfortable with U.S. unilateralism (their numbers would greatly increase in the run-up to the invasion of Iraq). There was also an uneasy relationship with explicitly antisemitic groups who charged that the war was being waged on behalf of Israel, with the few, small right-wing anti-war groups, and with certain political fringe groups, such as the followers of Lyndon LaRouche. These latter groups sometimes participated in the same demonstrations with other opponents of the war, but seldom were actively involved in any of the same organized coalitions.

Almost no one denied the connection between Afghanistan's Taliban rulers and al-Qaida. However, various leftists opposed the Afghanistan invasion and the subsequent invasion of Iraq on grounds of pacifism, belief that the war was illegal under international law, opposition to perceived U.S. imperialism, disbelief (especially in the case of Iraq) in the sincerity of the U.S.'s stated war aims of counter-terrorism and the spread of political freedom, belief that the wars were motivated by neocolonialism and petroleum politics, and, in a few cases, denial of al-Qaida's responsibility for the September 11 attacks.

Another argument against the Afghanistan invasion was that war would bring unnecessary suffering on the people of Afghanistan and that it was not the most effective way to dislodge or isolate al-Qaida—‌that in fact it would inflate their importance and gain them recruits. Similarly, in the case of the later invasion of Iraq, some felt that Iraq was not a threat to the United States and that a preemptive attack was morally wrong though Saddaam Hussein was widely seen as a violent dictator. A number of people condemned the latter war because they doubted U.S. and other claims about Saddam's relation to al-Qaida, about his possession of weapons of mass destruction (WMDs), and about the effectiveness of war as a means of containing WMDs, or because of the lack of United Nations support for war.

Many Islamists and Arabs, and a few leftists, saw the military campaigns as battles in a religious war—‌a crusade—‌against Islam. This was the obverse of the ideas expressed, for example, by Samuel P. Huntington in The Clash of Civilizations and the Remaking of World Order. However this view was mostly rejected by those on the left, who generally rejected the doctrine that the world is divided into civilisations with fundamentally opposed cultures.

In the United Kingdom, the Stop the War Coalition was formed within weeks of the 9/11 attacks. The coalition rallied political groups around three main principles: condemnation and rejection of both the war on terrorism and the 9/11 attacks, opposition to the erosion of civil rights and the racist backlash that followed 9/11, and unity of the constituent groups in their aim to build a mass-movement to prevent wars in the context of the war on terrorism, but diversity in the sense that constituent groups were free to develop their own political analysis and local activities. Over the next two years, the Stop the War Coalition organised a series of mass demonstrations in London, together with the Campaign for Nuclear Disarmament and the Muslim Association of Britain, culminating in the largest demonstration in British history on 15. February 2003, with 1–2 million demonstrators. Although the Stop the War Coalition includes a broad range of political groups, it is often criticised because of the strong influence of the Socialist Workers Party.

== Anti-war organizations and rallies ==
The anti-war movement has organized massive anti-war rallies in opposition to the War on Terrorism. Some of the most prominent organizations began by opposing the 2001 invasion of Afghanistan. Others formed only after the Afghanistan invasion and after Bush's January 29, 2002 State of the Union address was widely seen on the left as threatening confrontation with Iraq, Iran, and North Korea, which Bush referred to collectively as an "axis of evil".

=== Left and anti-war in the U.S. ===
The most prominent U.S.-based movement groups are Act Now to Stop War and End Racism (ANSWER), Not in Our Name (NION), and United for Peace and Justice (UFPJ).

ANSWER was one of the first U.S. left groups to form after the September 11 attacks in order to express dissent from the nascent "War on Terror". With the U.S. left divided on the merits of military action against the Taliban regime in Afghanistan, the International Action Center (IAC), a group founded in 1992 by former U.S. attorney general Ramsey Clark and perceived as closely tied to the Workers World Party. Drawing on that party's tight organization, ANSWER attracted an estimated 8,000 people to their first major action, an "Anti-War, Anti-Racist" rally and march in Washington, D.C., primarily in protest of the then impending invasion of Afghanistan. This rally occurred on September 29, 2001, a mere 18 days after the September 11 attacks. This rally happened several hours after the first national protest against the war, an unpermitted march of 2,000 through the streets of Washington which had been organized by the Anti-Capitalist Convergence.

Notwithstanding their organizational ability, Workers World's role in ANSWER and ANSWER's role in the movement were (and are) controversial, both on the left and elsewhere. In a typical example of a critique from within the left, Michael Albert and Stephen R. Shalom writing on October 24, 2002 for Z, about a then-impending nationwide set of demonstrations (called by ANSWER), begin their discussion with a scathing critique of the views of Workers World, IAC, and (by implication) ANSWER. Describing IAC as an "extremely energetic antiwar group" and laying out its relationship to ANSWER, Clark, and Workers World (which they call "WWP"), they declare, "WWP holds many views that we find abhorrent. It considers North Korea 'socialist Korea'... a fantastic distortion of the reality of one of the most rigid dictatorships in the world. IAC expresses its solidarity with Slobodan Milosevic. ... [T]o champion Milosevic is grotesque. The ANSWER website provides an IAC backgrounder on Afghanistan that refers to the dictatorial government that took power in that country in 1978 as 'socialist' and says of the Soviet invasion the next year: the 'USSR intervened militarily at the behest of the Afghani revolutionary government'... In none of IAC's considerable resources on the current Iraq crisis is there a single negative word about Saddam Hussein. There is no mention that he is a ruthless dictator. (This omission is not surprising, given their inability to detect any problem of dictatorship with the Soviet-backed regime in Afghanistan.)..."

Albert and Shalom go on to discuss the quandary this presents for people like them opposed to the war: "If there were another large demonstration organized by forces more compatible with the kinds of politics espoused by other antiwar activists, including ourselves, then we would urge people to prefer that one. And there is no doubt we should be working to build alternative organizational structures for the antiwar movement that are not dominated by IAC. But at the moment the ANSWER demonstration is the only show in town."

Finally, they discuss how they expect these politics will and will not affect the demonstration: "IAC demonstrations... have programs skewed in the direction of IAC politics, but without excluding alternative voices. In general, the IAC speakers will not be offensive so much for what they say, but for what they don't say. That is, they won't praise Saddam Hussein from the podium, but nor will they utter a critical word about him. However, as long as other speakers can and do express positions with a different point of view, the overall impact of the event will still be positive, particularly in the absence of other options. Most of the people at the demonstration will in fact be unaware of exactly who said what and whether any particular speaker omitted this or that point. What they will experience will be a powerful antiwar protest. And most of the public will see it that way too."

ANSWER attracted significant numbers to their rallies, but acquired few formal endorsements. In contrast, the list of early endorsers of NION's spring 2002 "Statement of Conscience" reads like a Who's Who of the U.S. left, ranging from celebrities such as Laurie Anderson, Deepak Chopra, and John Cusack, to intellectuals like Noam Chomsky, Toni Morrison, and Howard Zinn.

NION was founded a full six months after ANSWER, as it was becoming clear that the U.S.'s military response to September 11 would not stop with Afghanistan. Despite its wide endorsements, NION's origins too gave pause to some on the left. Quoting again from the same article by Albert and Shalom, "Significant impetus behind NION comes from the Revolutionary Communist Party (RCP). RCP identifies itself as followers of Marxism–Leninism–Maoism. Their website expresses support for Shining Path in Peru, ... an organization with a gruesome record of violently targeting other progressive groups. For the RCP, freedom doesn't include the right of a minority to dissent (this is a bourgeois formulation, they say, pushed by John Stuart Mill and Rosa Luxemburg)..."

Despite these origins, Albert and Shalom see NION in a rather different light than ANSWER—and this goes far to explain the list of endorsements by prominent members of the U.S. Left. Albert and Shalom acknowledge the broad endorsements of the "eloquent and forceful" pledge and write, "RCP does not push its specific positions on NION to the degree that IAC does on ANSWER", pointing out the contrast between the contents of the respective organizations' web sites: "[T]he NION website and its public positions have no connection to the sometimes bizarre views of the RCP. The case for participating in NION events is stronger than for ANSWER events. It still makes overwhelming sense to build better antiwar coalitions, but in the meantime supporting NION activities promotes an antiwar message that we support, with relatively little compromise of our views."

The third major U.S. group, UFPJ, founded around the time Albert and Shalom were writing, has been generally exempt from such accusations of sectarianism. Motivated no doubt in part by some of the same issues raised by Albert and Shalom, UFPJ has been, from the start, a broad coalition of organizations; NION itself is a member of UFPJ, as are MoveOn, the National Council of Churches, and Albert's own Z magazine.

The groups have collaborated at times on events, although collaboration has not always been easy. In perhaps the most infamous incident, Rabbi Michael Lerner was banned from speaking at a February 16, 2003 anti-war rally in San Francisco, less than a month before the U.S. invaded Iraq. It was generally believed that this was done at ANSWER's behest, because Lerner had been critical of what he perceives as ANSWER's anti-Israel politics. Lerner, though irked that NION and UFPJ did not stand up for his inclusion as a speaker, continued to encourage people to attend the rally.

=== Anti-war in Europe ===
There was widespread and passionate support for the U.S. in Europe after the September 11 attacks, and little opposition to the invasion of Afghanistan and moves against the Al'Qaeda network. However, a large anti-war movement began to develop when the American government started agitating for an invasion of Iraq. Before and during the invasion and subsequent occupation of Iraq, opposition to George W. Bush the war was widespread in Europe. A number of people were angered by what was seen as a stubborn unilateralism.

Some have speculated that European countries were against a war because of a resurgence of "anti-American" sentiment. Contributing to these feelings were the positions taken by the George W. Bush administration on international issues: for example, American policies on global warming and environmental protection, on the International Criminal Court, on pre-emptive attack, and what has long been perceived as a policy of stubborn unilateralism practiced by successive American governments culminating in the Bush administration and especially the neoconservatives within it.

The commonly articulated reasons included: a belief that the UN process (including Hans Blix's inspections) should be allowed to reach its natural conclusion, an aversion to America's neo-con bellicosity, a belief that the threat posed by Iraq was being exaggerated, a preference for multilateralism, a belief that war might just "serve as a recruiting sergeant for Al-Qaida", and fear of the "fog of war" i.e. the uncertain and unpredictable consequences of invading another country.

The scale of the change in attitudes in Europe between 9/11 and late 2002 was astonishing, with the enormous goodwill and support of the immediate 9/11 period having been greatly eroded. Changes in the Republic of Ireland are an example of this. In the aftermath of the destruction of the World Trade Center, Ireland declared an unprecedented full national day of mourning for the victims. The reaction was two-fold: horror at the deaths but also a strong degree of sympathy for the United States, whom Ireland saw as a friend, particularly after US President Bill Clinton's welcome interventions during the negotiation of the Good Friday Agreement. By February 2003, the public reaction to the Bush administration actions over Iraq had changed America's image utterly. Instead of being seen in a positive light, the United States under Bush was seen as a 'bully' determined to force the international community to accept its demand for a war against Iraq, and if necessary ignore the international community in the United Nations. Hence, an estimated 100,000 people took part in an anti-war march in Dublin (the organisers had expected 20,000) with demands being made that the United States be refused permission to use Shannon Airport as a stop over point when flying their soldiers from the United States to countries bordering Iraq. Yet opinion polls showed that the Irish would support a war if it had United Nations approval. What they would not support was a non-UN-sanctioned war declared in defiance of the UN by the Bush administration.

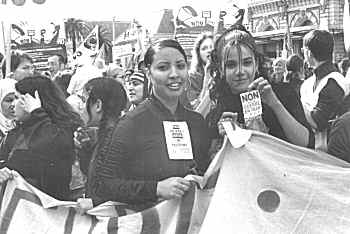
Protests in France

Such 'anti-Bush' and anti-war sentiments were reflected in multiple western European countries, generally with the populace less sympathetic to the U.S. stance even when politicians in a given country (e.g. the UK and Spain) aligned themselves with the U.S. position. The general populations of France and Germany were opposed to the war and it would have been difficult for their governments had they failed to reflect those sentiments in policy. France's position in particular has been very much maligned within the U.S. After the first UN resolution, France advised the U.S. that it (the USA) had sufficient UN support to launch a war and that it (the USA) need not return to the UN for a second resolution. Nonetheless, the U.S. and the UK did push for a second resolution (to help Mr. Blair gain support for the war within the UK) and France reversed its earlier positions, unable then to agree to what was proposed. The French government took the position that the UN inspection process should be allowed to be completed.

Some observers, being then unconvinced that Iraq's secular government had any links to Al-Qaida, the terrorist group that attacked the U.S., expressed puzzlement that the U.S. would consider military action against Iraq and not against North Korea, which had claimed it already had nuclear weapons and had announced that it was willing to contemplate war with the U.S.

Many critics of the American war on terror, including the UK's foreign intelligence services, did not believe that American actions would help to end terror, and believed that they would actually increase the ranks and capabilities of terrorist groups; some believed that during the war and immediate post-war period there would be a greatly increased risk that weapons of mass destruction would fall into the wrong hands (including Al-Qaida).

America's presence in Middle-Eastern countries like Saudi Arabia has been one source of discontent that has served as an excuse to Islamic fundamentalists to commit acts of violence. Even as the U.S. downscales its presence and existing bases (e.g. Saudi Arabia), it is not clear that the U.S. presence in Iraq will be anything but de-stabilising because a number of people in the Muslim world resent the "infidel" presence in the Middle East, using this as a means of inciting the disenfranchised in their populations to violence. On the other hand, a stable democracy in Iraq could have a stabilising influence. Clearly, there was a gamble there, and only the post-war period will prove which viewpoint was correct.

Perhaps the most commonly heard criticism, at least outside of the U.S., was that the Bush Administration's reason for going to war with Saddam was to gain control over Iraqi natural resources (i.e., oil). Though few doubt that nuclear and WMD proliferation is a serious threat to stability and well-being, some felt that a war in Iraq would not aid in eliminating this threat and that the real reason was to secure control over the Iraqi oil fields (at a time when arguably links with Saudi Arabia were at risk).

Popular opposition to war on Iraq in Europe led to a wave of anti-war rallies, which climaxed in an international synchronized anti-war demonstration around the world on February 15, 2003. The largest of these rallies were in Rome, Barcelona, and in London where over one million marched at a rally organised by the Stop the War Coalition. All three of these cities are in countries that were part of the "coalition of the willing" which took part in the war in Iraq.

== Criticism of the anti-war movement ==
=== Allegations of hypocrisy and influence of "radical" groups ===
Some critics, such as exiled Iranian writer Amir Taheri, view portions of the anti-war movement in Western Europe as "an alliance between the radical Left and hard-line Islamists." In an article published in a somewhat edited version on June 10, 2004 in the Jerusalem Post, much of which is a rehash of his November 18, 2003 article in National Review, Taheri writes "In this month's election for a new European Parliament, voters in several European Union countries, notably France and Britain, are offered common lists of Islamist and leftist candidates... Europe's moribund extreme Left has found a new lease on life thanks to hundreds of young Muslim militants..."

Without actually naming the UK-based Stop the War Coalition, he discusses the membership of its steering committee: "18 come from various hard Left groups: communists, Trotskyites, Maoists, and Castroists. Three others belong to the radical wing of the Labour Party. There are also eight radical Islamists. The remaining four are leftist ecologists known as Watermelons (Green outside, red inside)." He points to a similar alliance of the French Revolutionary Communist League (LCR) and Workers' Struggle (LO) with radical Islamists. "Are these not the new slaves?" he quotes Olivier Besançonneau (who he describes as "leader of the French Trotskyites"), "Is it not natural that they should unite with the working class to destroy the capitalist system?"

"The European Marxist–Islamist coalition", argues Taheri, "does not offer a coherent political platform. Its ideology is built around three themes: hatred of the United States, the dream of wiping Israel off the map, and the hoped-for collapse of the global economic system." Taheri also claims that the French Communist Party (PCF) "commissioned a study of the possibilities of electoral alliances with Muslim organizations." He does not say that these Muslim organizations were Islamists or that anything ever came of the study.

Taheri clearly views this alliance with Islamists as compromising traditional humanist values of the left and all "leftist" values in general. He clearly implies that this coalition could go on to embrace terrorism, paraphrasing Ilich Ramírez Sánchez, the Venezuelan terrorist known as "Carlos the Jackal" to the effect that "Islam is the only force capable of persuading large numbers of people to become 'volunteers' for suicide attacks against the US", and directly quoting him, "Only a coalition of Marxists and Islamists can destroy the US."

While a number of leftists have happily worked with Arab or Muslim groups in opposition to perceived U.S. or Israeli imperialism, alliances between leftists and Islamists are relatively unusual, and Taheri's sole example of a leftist actually praising Islamist terrorists is from Carlos the Jackal, a terrorist himself. As discussed above, leftists widely condemned the September 11 attacks, although some differed from those to their right by contextualizing the attacks in terms of what they see as comparable or worse acts of imperialist violence. More typical examples of leftists working in anti-war coalitions with Muslims would be the membership of American Muslims for Jerusalem in UFPJ or of the Muslim Student Association, American Muslims for Global Peace, and Atlanta Masjid of Al-Islam in ANSWER. These are Muslim groups, but they are not Islamist groups.

=== Allegations of anti-Americanism and anti-Semitism within the European anti-war movement ===
Some allege that anti-American sentiments were expressed at most of these anti-war protests in Europe. Some rallies even turned into violent events, with attacks on police, shops and passers-by, such as the March 24, 2003 rally in Hamburg, Germany.

Some also allege that as Muslim minorities are bigger in a number of European countries than in the U.S., they influenced the movement. (5%–10% for France, 3.7% for Germany, 1.3% for Greece, according to the CIA World Factbook). There has been an organised Muslim component in multiple European anti-war rallies, reflecting widespread opposition to the American war on terror campaign, often because of Arab/Muslim solidarity. In some groups, such as the British Stop the War Coalition, Muslims have taken leading positions. The presence of extremists and alleged Islamists has been cited by commentators such as Taheri in questioning the anti-war groups' commitment to human rights.

Anti-Israeli slogans and acts, allegedly most often chanted and committed by Islamists, have caused some to see anti-war rallies to be "hijacked" by them to become anti-Israeli, anti-Zionist and anti-Western events.

In France, Iraqi and Palestinian flags were common in anti-war rallies, while Israeli flags were often set on fire. In one case, the inflammatory atmosphere led to a serious case of violence: two Jewish teenagers, members of Hashomer Hatzair, were attacked in a demonstration in Paris against the war in Iraq. Aurélie Filippetti, a spokeswoman of the Green Party in Paris, was among the organizers of the demonstration. In an interview she gave Maariv correspondent Sefi Handler, she criticized some of her fellow French left-wingers for creating an anti-Israeli atmosphere which encourages antisemitism. She said:

I felt we should stop putting our head in the sand, saying that these are only fringe effects and therefore 'none of our concern', which leads us to just condemn them and do nothing more... They explained to me that the slogan 'Bush and Sharon are murderers' is not antisemitism but anti-Zionism. But for me, when you burn the flag of Israel, it is antisemitism. The meaning is the delegitimation of Israel's right to exist.

As a protest, Fillipetti promised to carry both flags of Israel and the Palestinians in the next demonstration as a message of peace and solidarity with Israel's right to exist. As a result, she received threats and an urged meeting of the Green Party decided to forbid party activists to carry any national flag. Fillipetti honored the decision, but said that anti-war protests were still full with Iraq and Palestinian flags. "It was a violent event" she recalls. "I said to myself that if I would carry the flags of Israel and Palestinian, I then would face some serious troubles."

Parallel to the controversy over the flags, Filipetti published an article in the left-oriented French newspaper Libération in which she warned against the antisemitism that seemed to plague their own camp. It was an attack on her fellow leftists for turning a blind eye at what she characterized as the clearly anti-leftist character of some parts of their rallies and demonstrations. The article essentially accused certain members of the French left of being hypocrites (for allegedly tolerating the same kind of racist behavior that they were protesting against), and, as such, it came as a major shock and sparked much controversy.

Israeli left wing and Human rights activist, professor Amnon Rubinstein wrote that the French Left seems to hold a double standard: opposing neo-Nazism when it comes from the Western right wing (and particularly from the French Far Right, such as the Front National), but not when it comes from the "oppressed world" of the Arabs. He called that "the big treason of the French Left, which came as a shock to the Jews who used to see the Left as their true friend". These accusations have generated great controversy, particularly because they come from within the Left itself.

However, a 2004 Pew poll showed that in Europe, favourability ratings are much higher for Jews than for Muslims.

== See also ==
- American popular opinion of invasion of Iraq
- Anti-war
- Civil disobedience
- Criticism of the war on terror
- International public opinion on the war in Afghanistan
- Japanese history textbook controversies
- New anti-Semitism
- Protests against the Iraq war
- Protests against the invasion of Afghanistan
- Pacifism
- Opposition to the 2003 Iraq War
- Opposition to the War in Afghanistan (2001–present)
- Tax resistance
- Views on the 2003 invasion of Iraq
