= March 19, 2008, anti-war protest =

Global anti-Iraq war protest

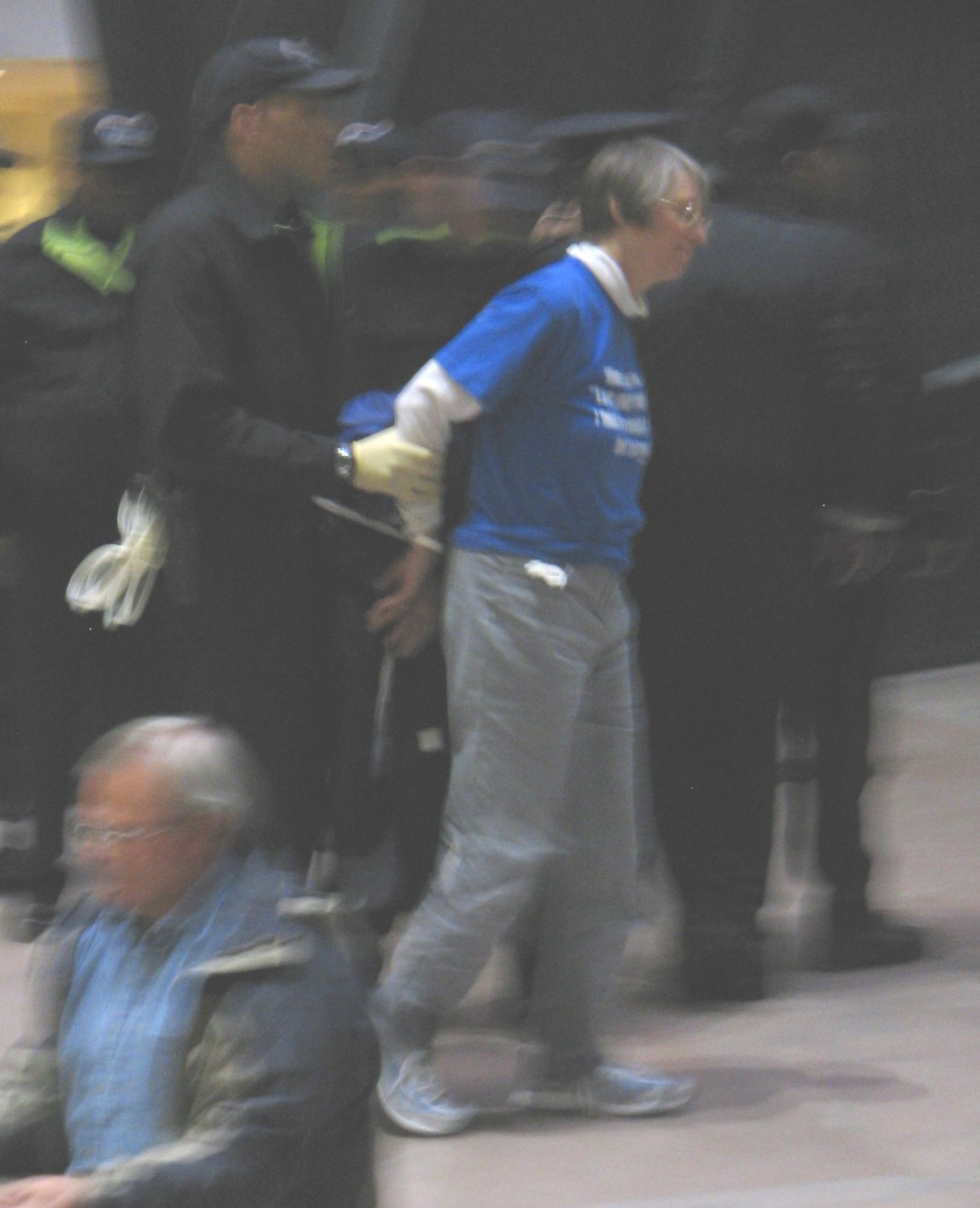
A protester being arrested inside the Hart Senate Office Building.

March 19, 2008, being the fifth anniversary of the United States 2003 invasion of Iraq and in protests and demonstrations in opposition to the war in Iraq, anti-war protests were held throughout the world including a series of autonomous actions in the United States' capitol, Washington, D.C., in London, Sydney, Australia, and the Scottish city of Glasgow with the latter three being organized by the UK-based Stop the War Coalition. Actions included demonstrations at government buildings and landmarks, protests at military installations and student-led street blockades. The protests were notable, in part, for mostly replacing mass marches with civil disobedience – including religious-focused protests – and for utilizing new technologies to both coordinate actions and interface with traditional print and broadcast media.

The 19th itself was a Wednesday so protests took place prior to, on the day of and after the actual anniversary.

== Fewer protesters ==
The numbers of protesters was significantly smaller than the original protests held the day after the invasion of Iraq had begun when thousands of protesters and many large demonstrations were held around the world in opposition to the war. Amongst the possible reasons are protester "fatigue", the timing of events, poor weather in some cities and that many protest actions are often ignored by the media even if the number of attendees is in the thousands. General apathy towards a war that most Americans feel little connection to as well as general decline in media coverage may have also led to lower turnout. According to a study conducted by the Project for Excellence in Journalism, war coverage in television, newspaper and Internet stories fell from 23% during the first ten weeks of 2007 to 3% during the same period in 2008.

ANSWER Coalition is largely accredited with being responsible for many of the recent United States-based anti-war protests. Formed in the wake of the September 11th attacks, ANSWER has since helped to organize many of the largest anti-war demonstrations in the United States, including demonstrations of hundreds of thousands against the Iraq War. Though its national headquarters are in Washington, D.C., where it organizes its national antiwar demonstrations, the coalition's influence is seen as being perhaps strongest in San Francisco, and increasingly, in Los Angeles. ANSWER has faced criticism from other anti-war groups for its affiliations as well as its tactics at demonstrations as well as charges of antisemitic sentiments expressed by some demonstrators at its protests. Michael Albert and Stephen R. Shalom writing in Z argue that most people at a "...demonstration will in fact be unaware of exactly who said what and whether any particular speaker omitted this or that point." The longer-term effects of these concerns may also play into declining numbers at protest events.

Another perspective was offered at the vigil in Kansas City, Missouri, where many of the attendees had previously taken part in protests of the Vietnam War, the only other United States war that has had more than five years of protests. One person drew a comparison noting a "fundamental misconception" with many of the protesters, "They're against it not because it was wrong," stated Dave Pack, chair of the PeaceWorks board of directors, "but because it wasn't going the way they wanted it to." He went on to say that he felt some didn't feel the war was wrong to begin with but they now feel the war is wrong. A CNN-Opinion Research poll released March 19 found 32 percent of Americans support the conflict while 61 percent said they want the next president to remove most U.S. troops within a few months of taking office.

== Washington D.C. ==
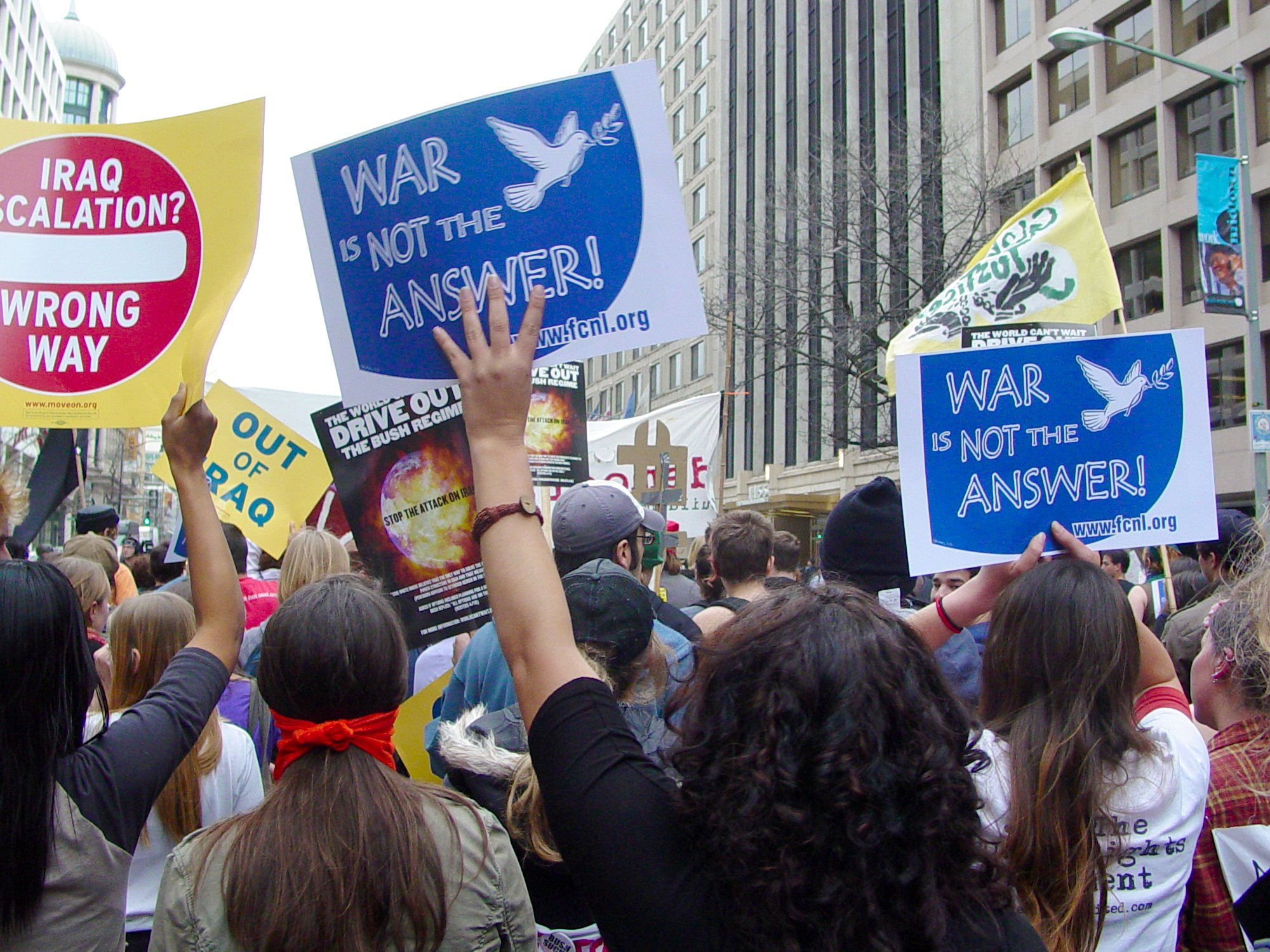
Students for a Democratic Society protesters march towards the Armed Forces Recruiting Office as part of their "Funk the War 3" protest in Washington D.C.

In Washington, D.C., the protests on March 19 were the culmination of other smaller demonstrations and events which took place during the weeks leading up to the five-year anniversary of the Iraq war. For example, on March 7, several churches in the city held services to pray for the safety of U.S. troops and an end to the war. In the afternoon the churchgoers marched to the Hart Senate Office Building with the intention of asking U.S. Senators to discontinue U.S.-funded terrorism. At least forty of the protesters were arrested as they entered the building and began praying for peace.

United for Peace and Justice (UFPJ), a coalition of more than 1,300 international and U.S.-based organizations opposed to what they describe as "our government's policy of permanent warfare and empire-building" organized the March 19 actions. The events – involving up to 1000 people – took place throughout the downtown with protesters marching on 12th street to the Internal Revenue Service (IRS) building on Constitution Avenue declaring that they do not want any more tax money being used to wage war. Led, in part, by the War Resisters League and Code Pink, 31 people were arrested for crossing police lines at the IRS and blocking three entrances. Demonstrators also gathered in front of institutions which profit from the war, such as the American Petroleum Institute – where they staged a sit-in blocking traffic – and at military recruitment offices. The protesters, including war veterans, demanded the arrests of President George W. Bush, Vice President Dick Cheney and Secretary of State Condoleezza Rice as war criminals. Students for a Democratic Society protesters marched up and down K Street as part of their "Funk the War" protest to "put on the map all the people who profited from the war". Other protesters hurled balloons full of red paint at a military recruiting station and smeared it on buildings of defense contractors Bechtel and Lockheed Martin. Many protesters marched to beating drums, and chanted, "No blood for oil!" Traffic in many areas was disrupted, and interruptions at the IRS were evident as workers inside were seen peering out windows at the protesters. At least thirty demonstrators were arrested around the IRS headquarters for crossing a police barricade. Two blocks from the Whitehouse, in McPherson Square, over two hundred protesters declared victory in shutting down traffic with some engaging the police while others chained their hands together inside school desks while demanding cuts in war spending and more money for education. According to a Congressional Budget Office (CBO) report published in October 2007, the U.S. war in Iraq could cost taxpayers $1.9 trillion by 2017 when counting the huge interest costs because combat is being financed with borrowed money.

One of the more visible groups, Code Pink, opted not to do a large protest in the capitol as the timing was just before the Easter break and the United States Congress would not be in session, however local chapters had plans to follow members of Congress and protest in smaller towns across the country. The Washington D.C. chapter did push a pink bed on wheels down the street, urging Americans to "wake up". Members of the "Granny Peace Brigade" delivered hand-knitted "stump socks" – "meant to keep the ends of amputated limbs warm" – to the Department of Veterans Affairs. A "March of the Dead" demonstration was staged near the Women in Military Service for America Memorial in Arlington National Cemetery. Outside the National Archives and Records Administration protesters laid a large cloth on the ground with the Preamble to the United States Constitution forcing those entering the building to walk over the text. Nearby a masked man in orange prison clothing kneeled with his hands tied behind his back while wearing a sign – "no torture, no secret prisons, no detention without legal process," referring to contentious issues tied to the United States' treatment of prisoners. Outside the White House protesters acted out a prisoner, dressed in an orange Guantanamo captives' uniform – which signifies the prisoner has been labeled "non-compliant" – being waterboarded.

== Chicago, Illinois ==
In Chicago, Illinois, thousands of protesters marched through the Chicago Loop and along Michigan Avenue to demand an end to the Iraq war. Members of a group, Iraq Veterans Against the War (IVAW), were among the marchers. One announced, "I'm letting the nation know that the troops are against the war, and that there's a whole culture of dissent and we're letting the nation know that exists."

On 23 March, Easter Sunday, at the Holy Name Cathedral in Chicago, a group of anti-war demonstrators – calling themselves Catholic Schoolgirls Against the War – stood up during the homily (sermon) and "decried the deaths of 4,000 U.S. soldiers and thousands of Iraqi citizens" declaring "Even the Pope calls for peace!" Security guards ushered the protesters out as the demonstrators splattered themselves with stage blood getting some on nearby worshipers, six were subsequently arrested by police. After the service a cardinal lamented the protests but affirmed the Catholic Church's position against U.S.-led warfare in Iraq. Both Pope Benedict XVI and the United States Conference of Catholic Bishops have opposed the Iraq war since its inception, and the pope used his Easter homily to renew calls for an Iraq resolution to "safeguard peace and the common good."

== Los Angeles ==
In Los Angeles, California, thousands of people, led by veterans from various conflicts, holding coffins draped with the US flag marched down Hollywood Boulevard denouncing George W. Bush, several California politicians and actors were expected for the final part of the march on Sunset Boulevard. Other events were planned for Beverly Hills, Echo Park, West Los Angeles, North Hollywood, Pasadena, Culver City and Malibu.

== San Francisco Bay Area ==
In San Francisco, California, protests occurred throughout the day and in different parts of the city with up to 150 people arrested for misdemeanors such as trespassing, resisting arrest and blocking an intersection. Part of the success of the group coordinating named Direct Action was due to utilizing smart mob technologies including text messaging, Google Maps, live video-feeds and internet radio updates. In contrast to the first-day protests in 2003 when the city was effectively shut down in many ways, the protests were focussed on specific targets and conveying messages – "there's little point in barricading the Bay Bridge in a city where most people are against the war anyway." In the morning, a group of 500 worked their way through the morning commute effectively tying-up traffic for hours as the police had to block, move and re-block streets and busses for the procession. The Federal Reserve Bank and Chevron Corporation were also targeted with actions and saw arrests. Starting around noon and lasting for several hours the most "dramatic" protests were a die-in – again blocking the main traffic artery, Market Street – directly in front of California Senator Dianne Feinstein's office. Feinstein supported the Iraq war resolution and subsequent supplemental appropriations bills although she has stated she was deceived by the Bush administration about the weapons of mass destruction. As police arrested dozens of protesters more would take their place. In the evening 7000 marched and rallied in front of San Francisco City Hall hearing speeches including Assemblywoman Carole Migden. Although mostly peaceful some police were pelted with glass Christmas ornaments filled with paint.

In Berkeley, California, demonstrators gathered for a rally then marched on a military recruiting office which has been part of an ongoing military recruiting controversy and declared that the Iraq War is "unjust", and that Marine recruiters were "unwelcome intruders" in the city.

== New York City ==
In New York City autonomous events happened throughout the day, at one protest women "sang and counted the war dead" at the Times Square military recruiting station which was recently the target of a bomb. Outside the New York Stock Exchange three groups affiliated with the Peace Action coalition were arrested for blocking traffic and the checkpoints for the Stock Exchange. Carrying "blood-splattered" signs displaying the record profits of companies – like Boeing, General Dynamics and Halliburton – they were trying to make the connection between those who they said were war profiteering and those who are prosecuting the war.

== Other cities ==
Smaller events happened throughout the United States from somber vigils to the more boisterous; in Frankfort, Kentucky, and Greenville, South Carolina, vigils were held – in Greenville's Piazza Bergamo a candle was lit for each U.S. soldier killed. In Albany, New York, protesters held a rally outside the capitol. In Des Moines, Iowa, protesters stood in the hallway outside recruiting offices at the Armed Forces Career Center with signs such as "Enlist Now Pay Later - The Cost Is Too Great - Troops Home Now". In Trenton, New Jersey, about 75 people, including family members of US soldiers killed, protested outside the statehouse. In Burlington, Vermont, University of Vermont students protested outside General Dynamics' Weapons Development and Design Facility with banners denouncing war profiteering and called on their state-funded school to divest in the defense contractor. In Miami, Florida, protesters dressed in black laid flowers at the United States Southern Command during the morning rush hour.

Protesters blocked the entrance of a military recruiting center in Des Moines, Iowa, with two getting arrested.

In downtown Portland, Oregon, demonstrators chanted "End the silence, Stop the violence", while others marched to blaring horns and beating drums. At one point police used pepper spray on unruly protesters. A group of several dozen of the marchers left the confrontation and boarded a light rail train to continue the protests at a military recruiting station. Police on motorcycles and police in riot gear followed the demonstrators to the rail station at which point one of the protesters declared "sorry, no room for bikes" as officers watched the demonstrators leave.

In Madison, Wisconsin, protesters and peace activists were reading the names of casualties of the Iraq War outside a recruiting station when three of them went inside to engage the recruiters in dialog. They were arrested but the charges later dropped. As part of their defense they stated "they were not disruptive and were in a government office on public property paid for by taxpayers, in which they had a right to be."

In Baltimore, Maryland, dozens of silent protesters held sign and stood behind a row of boots and other footwear which symbolized "the loss of life, among Maryland troops and Iraqi civilians, during the war in Iraq". Sponsored by the American Friends Service Committee, a Quaker social justice and peace organization, and the Baltimore Area Coalition for Truth in Recruiting they tried to add a visual representation of the loss of life. In December 2007, President Bush put the Iraq War death toll among Iraqi citizens at about 30,000. Most estimates are much higher, for example, in January 2008 the Iraqi health minister, Dr Salih al-Hasnawi, reported the results of the "Iraq Family Health Survey" – carried out for the World Health Organization – that estimated 151,000 violence-related Iraqi deaths from March 2003 through June 2006. The results were published in the New England Journal of Medicine.

== See also ==
- Catholic Church against war on Iraq
- List of protest marches on Washington, DC
- Opposition to the Iraq War
- The UN Security Council and the Iraq war
- Worldwide government positions on war on Iraq
- Protests against the Iraq War
