= Early (name) =

Early is both a surname and a given name which may refer to:

== People ==
=== Surname ===
- Alan Early (born 1983), Irish graphic designer and writer
- Biddy Early (1798–1874), Irish herbalist
- Cleanthony Early (born 1991), American basketball player
- Connelly Early (born 2002), American baseball player
- David Early (1938–2013), American actor
- Delloreese Patricia Early (1931–2017), stage name Della Reese, American singer, actress, television personality, author and ordained minister
- Edward Early (born 1935), American politician
- Edward J. Early Jr. (1931–2023), American lawyer and politician
- Eleazer Early (1779–1840), American hotelier
- Gerald Early (born 1952), American writer, culture critic and professor
- James M. Early (1922–2004), American electrical engineer for whom the Early effect was named
- John Early (disambiguation)
- Joseph D. Early (1933–2012), U.S. Congressman from Massachusetts
- Jubal Anderson Early (1816–1894), Confederate American Civil War general
- Margaret Early (1919–2000), American actress
- Nathaniel B. Early (1866–1947), American politician
- Peter Early (1773–1817), American politician
- Quinn Early (born 1965), American football player and stuntman
- Stephen Early (1889–1951), White House Press Secretary (1933–1945, 1950)
- Steve Early (born 1956), American boxer

=== Given name ===
- Early Doucet (born 1985), American football wide receiver
- Early Wynn (1920–1999), American baseball pitcher

== Fictional characters ==
- Jubal Early, a bounty hunter in the television series Firefly
- Early Cuyler, in the cartoon show Squidbillies
- Early Grayce, a sociopathic parolee in the film Kalifornia
- The Early family, in the film Ghostwatch

== See also ==
- Senator Early (disambiguation)
- Earley (surname)
- Earlie, a given name
