= Not in Our Name =

American anti-war group (2002–2008)

Not in Our Name (NION) was a United States organization founded on March 23, 2002 to protest the U.S. government's course in the wake of the September 11, 2001 attacks; it disbanded on March 31, 2008, and has since focused on newer groups including Courage to Resist, Jewish Voice for Peace, and Refuse Fascism.

== Two key documents ==
Early in their existence, NION produced two documents—the "Pledge of Resistance" and the "Statement of Conscience"—that NION members believe provide focus and expression to the U.S. anti-war movement.

=== "Pledge of Resistance" ===
The Pledge is written by Starhawk and Saul Williams, in the style of free verse, beginning:

We believe that as people living
in the United States it is our
responsibility to resist the injustices
done by our government,
in our names

Not in our name
will you wage endless war

and concluding

Another world is possible
and we pledge to make it real.

The pledge opposes what it characterizes as "endless war", "transfusions of blood for oil", invasions of foreign countries, bombing civilians, and killing children. It goes on, "Not in our name / will you erode the very freedoms / you have claimed to fight for." It implicitly accuses the Bush administration of deeming "whole peoples or countries" as "evil" and pledges, among other things, "...alliance with those/ who have come under attack / for voicing opposition to the war / or for their religion or ethnicity."

The Not in My Name EP was released in May 2003 by Saul Williams with assistance from DJ Spooky, DJ Goo and Coldcut.

=== "Statement of Conscience" ===
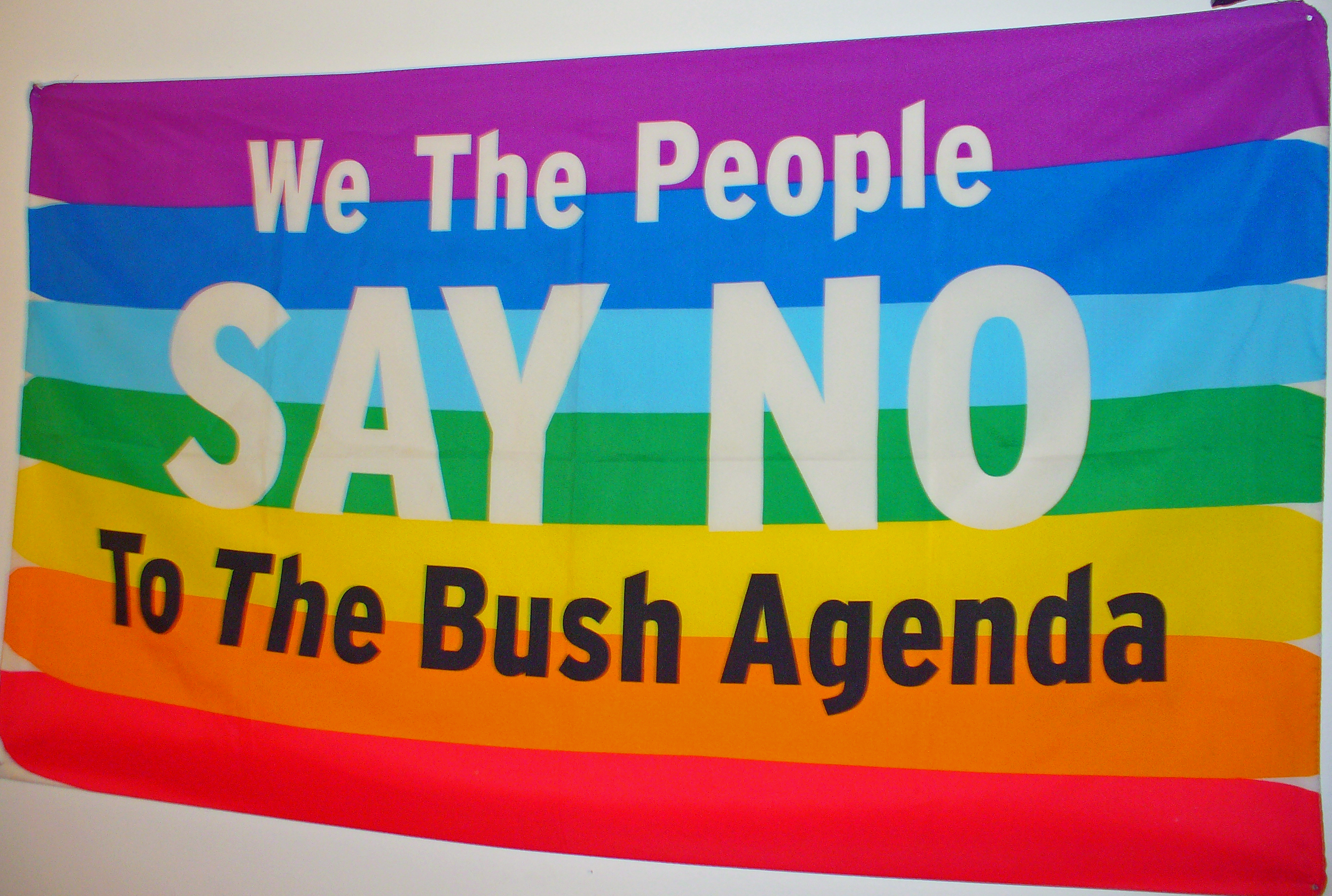
These flags became an international symbol of solidarity with this statement

NION's "Statement of Conscience", drafted in spring 2002, first lists a series of criticisms of the Bush Administration and (secondarily) the U.S. Congress and calls on the people of the U.S. "...to resist the policies and overall political direction that have emerged since September 11, 2001, and which pose grave dangers to the people of the world."

Among the specific principles advocated in the statement are the right of self-determination for peoples and nations and the importance of due process and dissent. The statement expresses "shock" at "the horrific events of September 11, 2001" but, evoking "similar scenes in Baghdad, Panama City, and, a generation ago, Vietnam", describes Iraq as "a country which has no connection to the horror of September 11", and deplores the administration's "spirit of revenge" and the "simplistic script of 'good vs. evil': "In our name, the Bush administration, with near unanimity from Congress, not only attacked Afghanistan but arrogated to itself and its allies the right to rain down military force anywhere and anytime."

Referring to the U.S. government's treatment of immigrants in the wake of September 11, the statement accuses the U.S. government of creating "two classes of people: those to whom the basic rights of the U.S. legal system are at least promised, and those who now seem to have no rights at all", and evokes "the infamous concentration camps for Japanese-Americans in World War II".

Protesting "a pall of repression" and referring specifically to the USA PATRIOT Act as emblematic of that repression, it accuses the executive branch of usurping "the roles and functions of the other branches of government," and continues, "We must take the highest officers of the land seriously when they talk of a war that will last a generation and when they speak of a new domestic order. We are confronting a new openly imperial policy towards the world and a domestic policy that manufactures and manipulates fear to curtail rights."

NION urges a movement of resistance: "President Bush has declared: 'you're either with us or against us.' Here is our answer: We refuse to allow you to speak for all the American people ... We refuse to be party to these wars and we repudiate any inference that they are being waged in our name or for our welfare ..." It indicates as inspiration "...Israeli reservists who, at great personal risk, declare 'there IS a limit' and refuse to serve in the occupation of the West Bank and Gaza", the abolitionists, and "those who defied the Vietnam war" and concludes, "we will resist the machinery of war and repression and rally others to do everything possible to stop it."

=== Signatories ===
NION's web site lists a broad array of signatories to the pledge, listing only those who signed before July 17, 2002. Among those are:

- James Abourezk, former U.S. Senator
- Dr. Patch Adams
- Robert Altman, film director
- Laurie Anderson, performance artist
- John Perry Barlow, co-founder, Electronic Frontier Foundation
- Medea Benjamin
- Noam Chomsky
- Deepak Chopra
- Ramsey Clark, former U.S. Attorney General and founder of ANSWER
- John Cusack, actor
- Angela Davis
- Ossie Davis
- Zack de la Rocha, of Rage Against the Machine
- Ruby Dee
- Mos Def
- Ani DiFranco
- Diane di Prima
- Bernardine Dohrn
- Michael Eric Dyson
- Steve Earle
- Barbara Ehrenreich
- Daniel Ellsberg
- Brian Eno
- Eve Ensler
- Lawrence Ferlinghetti
- Fifty-three Maryknoll priests and brothers
- Jane Fonda
- Michael Franti, of Spearhead
- Terry Gilliam
- Tom Hayden
- Rev. Jesse Jackson
- Mumia Abu-Jamal
- Fredric Jameson
- Jim Jarmusch
- Chalmers Johnson, author of Blowback
- Casey Kasem
- Barbara Kingsolver
- Yuri Kochiyama
- Tony Kushner
- Spike Lee
- Rabbi Michael Lerner, editor, Tikkun
- Phil Lesh, of the Grateful Dead
- Jim McDermott, U.S. representative
- Cynthia McKinney, U.S. representative
- David McReynolds
- W. S. Merwin
- Toni Morrison
- Walter Mosley
- Odetta
- Claes Oldenburg
- Ozomatli
- Grace Paley
- Michael Parenti
- Harold Prince
- Bonnie Raitt
- Adrienne Rich
- Edward Said
- Lucy Sante
- Susan Sarandon
- John Sayles
- Pete Seeger
- Toshi Seeger
- Frank Serpico
- Richard Serra
- Rev. Al Sharpton
- Wallace Shawn
- Martin Sheen
- Russell Simmons
- Art Spiegelman
- Gloria Steinem
- Oliver Stone
- Rose Styron
- William Styron
- Studs Terkel
- Gore Vidal
- Kurt Vonnegut
- Alice Walker
- Wavy Gravy
- Cornel West
- Howard Zinn

== 2005 Statement of Conscience ==
NION issued an updated Statement of Conscience in January 2005, expressing dissent on the occasion of the re-inauguration of George W. Bush as president of the United States.

== Slogans ==
The group uses the following phrases in its rhetoric:

- Not by our will
- Not in our name
- Not by our hearts
- I Say NO to the Bush Agenda
- No War On the World
- No Police State Restrictions
- No Round-ups and Detentions

== Controversies ==
=== Role in the anti-war movement ===
A partial parallel for the founding of Not in Our Name (NION) is the founding of the anti-war coalition ANSWER. ANSWER was founded on 14 September 2001, on the eve of the U.S. invasion of Afghanistan, largely by members of the Workers World Party (WWP). NION was founded on 23 March 2002, largely by members of the Revolutionary Communist Party (RCP), which continues to be prominent among its leadership. (In 2005, four years after its founding, the Party for Socialism and Liberation, an offshoot of WWP, became a more prominent influence than the WWP in the leadership of ANSWER.)

Nonetheless, in contrast to ANSWER, NION has a broad set of endorsers and is generally regarded as a cooperative participant in the broader anti-war movement. An October 2002 article by Michael Albert and Stephen R. Shalom in Z magazine is typical among expressions by anti-war critics of the RCP that, despite its origins, NION is a cooperative participant in the movement. After excoriating the RCP for holding various positions that Albert and Shalom find abhorrent, they then write, "Despite these views, however, RCP does not push its specific positions on NION to the degree that IAC does on ANSWER. For example, while the ANSWER website offers such things as ... [an] IAC backgrounder on Afghanistan ..., the NION website and its public positions have no connection to the sometimes bizarre views of the RCP." This is reflected in the wide range of signatories to their "Statement of Conscience".

Also, NION is itself now a member of a broader coalition United for Peace and Justice, founded in October 2002 (a year after ANSWER) by individuals and groups seeking to curb ANSWER's influence in the anti-war movement.

An example of NION's willingness to cooperate came when they postponed their national moratorium against the war to coincide with the March 5, 2003 "Books Not Bombs" student strike called by the National Youth and Student Peace Coalition.

=== Donation from Larry Flynt ===
In 2004, Robert Corsini, an organizer for Not in Our Name publicized Hardcore pornographer Larry Flynt's support for one of their campaigns. Aura Bogado, a feminist radio producer and news anchor for KPFK, objected privately in e-mail and asked to be removed from the organization's mailing list. Corsini forwarded his response to Bogado (including a copy of the original private e-mail) to NION national organizers, her employers at KPFK, and to Bruce David at Larry Flynt Publishing. Bogado replied to Corisini in detail on NION's public e-mail list, and participated in a sharp debate over the e-mail list that followed. After Hustler published a series of articles and sexual caricatures attacking Bogado, she made her criticism public in "Hustling the Left", published on ZNet in June 2005. Bogado charged that Leftist leaders were tacitly supporting racism and misogyny by aligning themselves with Flynt, and specifically criticized Greg Palast, Amy Goodman, Susie Bright, and Amy Alkon. The discussion of her article inspired similar criticism of Leftist leaders cooperating with Flynt by feminists such as Nikki Craft and pro-feminist Leftists such as Stan Goff. Shortly after the publication of her article, the Not in Our Name Steering Committee issued a public apology to Bogado and objected to the treatment of Bogado in Hustler.

== Antecedents of the name ==
Prior to the founding of Not in Our Name, other anti-war groups had used the name, including a group of families who were victims of the 9-11 World Trade Center attack, and Jewish youth protesting Israel's policies in the Palestinian territories. "Not in Our Name" is also a slogan used by the UK Stop the War Coalition. "Not in Our Name" has also been a petition drive to be signed by Muslims by CAIR, in which they say it is "not in the name of Muslims" that terrorist leaders such as Osama bin Ladin and Hambali are making these claims.

== See also ==
- List of anti-war organizations
- List of peace activists
