= Campaign for Peace and Democracy =

The Campaign for Peace and Democracy (CPD) was a socialist, New York City-based organization that promoted "a new, progressive and non-militaristic U.S. foreign policy," in contrast to existing foreign policy, which CPD characterized as "based on domination, militarism, fear of popular struggles, enforcement of an inequitable and cruel global economy and persistent support for authoritarian regimes." The hallmark of CPD's work was its efforts to seek out and work with dissidents and social justice movements worldwide, and to forge alliances between them and progressive movements in the United States. The organization had more than 100 endorsers, including Noam Chomsky, Naomi Klein, Daniel Ellsberg and Joanne Landy in 2017, CPD ceased to function.

== Initiatives ==
Since its inception, CPD was critical of U.S. foreign policy while at the same time defending democratic rights, whether in countries allied with the United States or not. In 2002, CPD issued a sign-on statement, "We Oppose Both Saddam Hussein and the U.S. War on Iraq: A Call for a New, Democratic U.S. Foreign Policy," which was published in The New York Times, The Nation, The Progressive and elsewhere. Subsequently, CPD launched actions in opposition to the Israeli attack on Gaza and worked with Czech and Polish peace activists to block the installation of U.S. radar and missile bases in the Czech Republic and Poland. It protested the persecution of trade unionists and human rights activists, such as Shirin Ebadi, as well as students and gay people, in Iran. After the 2009 Iranian presidential election, CPD put out a detailed statement in support of pro-democracy protests in Iran. In October 2009, it issued a widely circulated call for the Obama administration to end U.S. military action in Afghanistan and Pakistan; the statement appeared as an ad in the Pakistani newspaper, The News. In January 2010, CPD participated in a protest at the CIA headquarters in Langley, Virginia against drone attacks. After the disastrous floods in Pakistan in August 2010, CPD circulated an appeal by the Sindh Labour Relief Committee, including 14 Pakistani unions and progressive organizations, for financial aid to the flood victims. CPD also posted a statement on the floods' political context by the Labour Party Pakistan and the National Trade Union Federation. In October 2010, CPD issued a sign-on statement, "End the War Threats and Sanctions Program Against Iran: Support the Struggle for Democracy Inside Iran."

In December 2010, CPD declared its support for the work of Wikileaks, Julian Assange, and Chelsea Manning, which revealed the influence of the United States Intelligence Community on other countries. CPD enthusiastically welcomed the beginning of the Arab Spring with the statement, "We Support the Democratic Revolution in Tunisia" on Jan. 16, 2011. One month later, CPD hailed the Egyptian uprising in the statement "Egypt After Mubarak" on February 14, 2011, which also warned against the continuing power of the Egyptian military and elements of the old regime and called for the completion of the democratic revolution. As part of its ongoing work on behalf of the democratic movement in Iran, CPD led a delegation of peace and human rights activists in a visit to the U.S. and Iranian missions to the UN in February 2011, arguing with officials there that both U.S. war threats and sanctions program and Iranian repression should be ended. CPD opposed NATO intervention in Libya ("We support the Libyan Democratic Revolution and Oppose Western Intervention and Domination," April 16, 2011) and played an active role in building solidarity with the democratic opposition in Bahrain. The CPD statement, "End U.S. Support for Bahrain's Oppressive Government," which included hundreds of Bahraini signatures, was published in The Nation (June 6) and the New York Review of Books online (June 9, 2011). After Israeli soldiers on the Syrian border fired on Palestinian demonstrators in May 2011, CPD issued a statement condemning "Israel's Murderous Attack on Unarmed Palestinians" (June 9, 2011). As the Arab Spring continued, CPD declared its ardent support for Syrian democracy activists: "CPD Salutes Syria's Courageous Democratic Movement" (June 9, 2011). In response to the violence of the Assad regime, CPD released both a "Message of Condolence and Solidarity From U.S. Peace Activists to the Syrian People" and an "Open Letter to the Syrian Government in Protest Against the Death of Non-Violent Activist Ghayath Mattar and Brutal Repression of Syrian Democratic Activists" (Sept. 16, 2011).

== Peace and Democracy News ==
In the spring of 1984, CPD/EW published the first issue of its magazine, Peace and Democracy News. It printed a speech by Daniel Singer, the European correspondent for The Nation and author of books on Polish Solidarity, "A Plague on Both Their Houses", which had been delivered at a CPD/EW forum entitled "In Solidarity With the Right to Rebel: Spotlight on Chile and Poland"; the forum had also featured the Chilean playwright and novelist Ariel Dorfman. Subsequent writers for Peace and Democracy News (later renamed Peace and Democracy) included Adam Hochschild, Richard Falk, Jan Kavan, Judith Hempfling, Randall Forsberg, Ann Snitow, Daniel Ellsberg, Mina Hamilton, Stephen Shalom, Alex de Waal, and Matthew Rothschild, along with CPD staff writers Jennifer Scarlott, Steve Becker, Gail Daneker, Joanne Landy and Thomas Harrison.

The first issue of CPD/EW's journal, Peace and Democracy News, appeared in the spring of 1984. It published a speech given at a CPD/EW forum called "In Solidarity With the Right to Rebel: Spotlight on Chile and Poland" by Daniel Singer, the European correspondent for The Nation and author of the book "A Plague on Both Their Houses" about Polish Solidarity. The forum also included Chilean playwright and novelist Ariel Dorfman. Adam Hochschild, Richard Falk, Jan Kavan, Judith Hempfling, Randall Forsberg, Ann Snitow, Daniel Ellsberg, Mina Hamilton, Stephen Shalom, Alex de Waal, and Matthew Rothschild later contributed to Peace and Democracy News (later renamed Peace and Democracy), along with CPD staff writers Jennifer Scarlott, Steve Becker, Gail Daneker, and Joanne

== Core principles ==
Until 1995, when Peace and Democracy ceased publication and a decline in funding and popular support for a peace movement forced the organization into temporary dormancy, CPD/EW (which changed its name to the Campaign for Peace and Democracy in 1990 to reflect the end of the Cold War) continued to mount campaigns, organize conferences and issue statements based on its core principles: opposition to nuclear weapons and military intervention, withdrawal of U.S. troops and bases from all foreign countries, and international economic policies to combat poverty based on aid and development aimed at popular rather than corporate needs.

=== Détente from below ===
Embracing the idea of “détente from below," first articulated by British historian and peace activist E.P. Thompson, CPD insisted that lasting peace could not be achieved by relying on existing governments, with their own elite realpolitik agendas, but only by alliances of grassroots movements working across frontiers. In particular, CPD/EW strove to forge links among the Western liberal movements of the early 1980s, the U.S. anti-intervention movements then opposing the foreign policy of the Reagan administration, and Soviet bloc dissidents. CPD became widely known for its direct contacts with Eastern-Bloc activists, and provided many U.S. peace groups with the opportunity to meet them and support their democratic struggles.

== History ==
=== Founding ===
The group was founded in 1982 as the Campaign for Peace and Democracy/East and West (CPD/EW) by Joanne Landy and Gail Daneker. Its initial inspiration was the emergence of the independent Polish trade union movement Solidarność (Solidarity), and the massive upsurge of opposition to nuclear weapons represented by the Nuclear Freeze movement in the United States and the European Nuclear Disarmament (END) movement, which protested NATO deployment of cruise and Pershing missiles. CPD/EW was formed around a perspective of independence from both Cold War blocs; it dedicated itself to helping build a third alternative based on popular struggles for peace, human rights and social justice.

=== 1980s ===
Throughout the 1980s, CPD insisted that independent peace and human rights groups in the Soviet bloc, not government-controlled "peace councils," were the allies of Western peace movements. It drew up joint statements by peace and human rights activists from both sides of the Cold War divide condemning the Pinochet dictatorship in Chile, persecution of dissidents in Soviet Bloc states, U.S. intervention in Central America, the Tiananmen Square massacre in China, and Israel's refusal to withdraw from the Occupied Territories. As well as with END, CPD had close ties with the Green Party in West Germany (especially with party co-founder and leader Petra Kelly), Solidarność and the antiwar Freedom and Peace movement in Poland, Charter 77 in Czechoslovakia, and peace groups in the Soviet Union.

=== 1990s ===
The fall of Communism in Europe was welcomed by CPD, but after 1989, the group expressed its dismay that the form of social democracy advocated for by Solidarność was eclipsed in Eastern Europe and the former Soviet Union by a turn to a market economy instead. It spoke out against the imposition of "shock therapy" policies which sought to replace the old Communist system with policies that favored a capitalist market economy. During the 1990s, CPD opposed the aggression of the Yugoslav Army against the breakaway republics, the first Gulf War and U.S. intervention in Haiti. It sponsored debates over the issue of "humanitarian intervention".

=== Revival in 2002 ===
In 2002, the Campaign for Peace and Democracy was revived by co-directors Joanne Landy, Thomas Harrison and Jennifer Scarlott. With the death of Joanne Landy in 2017, CPD ceased to function. The Campaign for Peace and Democracy papers, including correspondence, flyers, and a complete set of Peace and Democracy News, are available at the Tamiment Library.

== Selected members ==
Ervand Abrahamian
Bashir Abu-Manneh
Janet Afary
Michael Albert
Stanley Aronowitz
Ed Asner
David Barsamian
Leslie Cagan
Tim Carpenter
Noam Chomsky
Joshua Cohen
Ariel Dorfman
Martin Duberman
Steve Early
Daniel Ellsberg
Jodie Evans
David Friedman
Barbara Garson
Howie Hawkins
Adam Hochschild
Doug Ireland
Richard Kim
Naomi Klein

Dan La Botz
Rabbi Michael Lerner
Nelson Lichtenstein
Dave Marsh
Kevin Martin
David McReynolds
Mary Nolan
Derrick O'Keefe
Christopher Phelps
Charlotte Phillips
Ruth Rosen
Bill Scheurer
Stephen Shalom
Alix Kates Shulman
Stephen Soldz
David Swanson
David Vine
Steve Weissman
Naomi Weisstein
Chris Wells
Cornel West
Reginald Wilson
