= Timeline of media in English =

This is a timeline of English-language publications, sorted by century.

== 18th century ==
- 1731 The Gentleman's Magazine (London) – appeared until 1907
- 1785 The Daily Universal Register later The Times (London)
- 1791 The Observer

== 19th century ==
- 1821 The Manchester Guardian
- 1827 In New York the first 'black' newspaper in the United States, Freedom's Journal, is founded.
- 1831 William Lloyd Garrison founds The Liberator, which opposed uncompromisingly Slavery - appeared until 1865
- 1838 The Bombay Times and Journal of Commerce, since 1861 The Times of India, today the English newspaper with the widest circulation, is founded
- 1843 The Economist
- 1851 The New-York Daily Times, later The New York Times
- 1857 Ralph Waldo Emerson and other writers found in Boston The Atlantic Monthly
- 1884 Financial News later Financial Times (London)
- 1886 Cosmopolitan
- 1888 The National Geographic Society (United States) is founded and starts to publish The National Geographic Magazine, later National Geographic
- 1889 Foundation of The Wall Street Journal in New York City
- 1895 Foundation of the American Historical Review (United States)

== 20th century ==
- 1906 Emma Goldman founds her magazine Mother Earth - appeared until 1917
- 1909 Foundation of the oldest Afro-American newspaper in the United States still being published - Amsterdam News (New York)
- 1909 Charlotte Perkins Gilman founds her feminist magazine The Forerunner - appeared until 1916
- 1911 Foundation of the Daily Herald, in Hollywood the first film studios are being opened
- 1914 the Times Literary Supplement becomes an independent publication
- 1922 British Broadcasting Corporation (BBC)
- 1922 Foundation of Reader's Digest - The conservative magazine is published in 19 languages and has about 100 million readers.
- 1923 Henry Luce and Briton Hadden found in New York City the magazine TIME
- 1926 NBC is founded as a radio network by RCA, General Electric and Westinghouse Electric Corporation.
- 1927 CBS, first only a radio station, starts to broadcast its regular television program in New York City on July 21, 1931.
- 1933 Foundation of Newsweek and U.S. News & World Report (United States)
- 1934 Foundation of Partisan Review (United States, appeared until 2003)
- 1936 Henry Luce founds Life in New York.
- 1938 the council communist magazine International Council Correspondence changes its name to Living Marxism. In 1942 it becomes New Essays. Its editor since 1934 had been Paul Mattick.
- 1945 Foundation of Commentary, published on behalf of the American Jewish Committee. it later became a leading neo-conservative publication.
- 1945 John H. Johnson founds Ebony, a popular afroamerican magazine still in publication
- 1946 Foundation of Far Eastern Economic Review (Hong Kong)
- 1953 Hugh Hefner founds Playboy (first only in the United States)
- 1955 In New York Dan Wolf, Ed Fancher and Norman Mailer found the alternative weekly The Village Voice.
- 1956 Phyllis Lyon and Del Martin found The Ladder, one of the first lesbian magazines in the United States.
- 1956 Drum Magazine (South Africa)
- 1959 The Manchester Guardian becomes The Guardian.
- 1960 New Left Review
- 1964 International Publishing Corporation starts the publication of the tabloid The Sun to replace Daily Herald.
- 1965 Cosmopolitan is transformed into a women's magazine. Its new trademark is a 'sexily' dressed women on the front cover.
- 1969 In the United States, the Public Broadcasting Service (PBS) is founded.
- 1972 Foundation of the first feminist film magazine Women and Film (Santa Monica, United States) – appeared until 1975
- 1972 Gloria Steinem founds the popular feminist magazine Ms. magazine (United States)
- 1972 In the United States the pay TV station Home Box Office starts broadcasting, since 1975 it's also available via satellite.
- 1972 In New York the Downtown Community Television (DCTV) Center is founded. The aim of the organization in the beginning was to empower less privileged groups to produce their own political videos. The productions of the DCTV today reach up to 100 million spectators every year.
- 1972 In the United States the film distributor Women Make Movies gegründet.
- 1974 Larry Flynt founds the pornographic magazine Hustler.
- 1975 Signs. Journal of Women and Culture in Society, one of the first and most renowned academic feminist journals is founded in the United States
- 1976 Philadelphia Gay News is founded as a weekly publication for the LGBT community
- 1979 London Review of Books
- 1980 Ted Turner founds CNN (United States).
- 1981 Rupert Murdoch's firm News International buys The Times.
- 1981 MTV starts broadcasting.
- 1982 In Great Britain Channel 4 is founded
- 1983 Foundation of The Jakarta Post (Indonesia)
- 1983 The Wall Street Journal Europe
- 1985 Viacom buys Warner-Amex Satellite Entertainment and therefore also MTV
- 1986 General Electric kauft die Radio Corporation of America (RCA) und damit auch deren Tochter NBC
- 1986 In Great Britain the newspaper The Independent is founded
- 1987 In the United States: Michael Albert and Lydia Sargent, two of the founders of South End Press, found the leftist Z Magazine.
- 1994 In Great Britain the music magazine Mojo is founded.
- 1995 Westinghouse Electric Corporation buys CBS, paying 5,4 billion Dollars.
- 1995 Website Z Net.
- 1996 Fox News Channel starts broadcasting (United States).
- 1999 Foundation of Indymedia (also in other languages)

== See also ==
- Historiography - this article includes a chronological list of historiographical journals

== Bibliography ==
- Erik Barnouw, Tube of Plenty: The Evolution of American Television, Oxford University Press 1992
- Rodger Streitmatter, Voices of Revolution: The Dissident Press in America, Paperback Edition, Columbia University Press 2001
- Rodger Streitmatter, Unspeakable: The Rise of the Gay and Lesbian Press in America, Faber & Faber 1995
- Rodger Streitmatter, Raising Her Voice. African American Women Journalists who changed History, University Press of Kentucky 1994
