= Morning Prayer =

Morning Prayer may refer to:

== Religion ==
- Prayers in various traditions said during the morning
- Morning Prayer (Anglican), one of the two main Daily Offices in the churches of the Anglican Communion
- In Roman Catholicism and Lutheranism:
  - Morning offering of Catholicism
  - Matins, general name for midnight or morning canonical hour in Western Christianity, also known as Sapro in other rites
    - Matins in Lutheranism
  - Lauds, a divine office that takes place in the early morning hours
- Fajr of Islam
- Shacharit in Jewish Services

== Other uses ==
- Morning Prayer (album), a 1978 album by jazz saxophonist Chico Freeman

== See also ==
- List of prayers
- Prayer (disambiguation)
- Morning (disambiguation)
- Mourning (disambiguation)
