= Early in the Morning =

Early in the Morning may refer to:

- "Early in the Morning" (Sonny Boy Williamson I song), a 1937 single by Sonny Boy Williamson I.
- "Early in the Mornin'" (Louis Jordan song), a 1947 single by Louis Jordan and His Tympany Five.
- "Early in the Morning" (Bobby Darin song), a 1958 single by Bobby Darin, also recorded by Buddy Holly on Coral Records.
- "Early in the Morning", a song by Peter, Paul and Mary from their album Peter, Paul and Mary.
- "Early in the Morning" (Vanity Fare song), a 1969 single by Vanity Fare.
- "Early in the Morning", a song (listed as traditional), on the 1965 album The Sound of '65 by The Graham Bond Organisation and on the 1970 album Ginger Baker's Air Force.
- "Early in the Morning", a 1979 song on the album Desolation Angels (album) by Bad Company.
- "Early in the Morning" (Gap Band song), a 1982 single by The Gap Band. Remake: Early in the Morning Robert Palmer 1985.
- "Early in the Morning" (Larry Santos song), a song by Larry Santos.
- Early in the Morning (James Vincent McMorrow album), 2010.
- Early in the Morning (Lorez Alexandria album), 1960.

== See also ==
- .
- Early Morning (disambiguation).
- Morning (disambiguation).
- Early (disambiguation)
