= Earley (surname) =

Earley is a surname. Notable people with the surname include:

- Arnold Earley (1933–1999), American baseball pitcher
- Arthur Earley (1925–1981), American politician
- Ashley Earley (born 1983), American basketball player
- Bill Earley (born 1956), American baseball catcher
- Candice Earley (1950–2019), American actress
- Charity Adams Earley (1918–2002), United States Army officer
- Darnell Earley, American politician
- Dermot Earley Jnr (born 1978), Irish Gaelic footballer
- Dermot Earley Snr (1948–2010), Irish army officer
- Jay Earley, American computer scientist
- Jim Earley (born 1956), American football player
- John Joseph Earley (1881–1945), American architect
- Jonathan Earley, Australian naval officer
- Kelsey Earley (born 1991), American beauty pageant titleholder
- Kevin Earley, American actor
- Maiya Earley (born 2002), American rapper and songwriter
- Mark Earley (born 1954), American politician
- Mark Earley Jr. (born 1987), American lawyer and politician
- Martin Earley (born 1962), Irish cyclist
- Mary Earley (1900–1992), American painter
- Mary Two-Axe Earley (1911–1996), Canadian indigenous women's rights activist
- Michael Earley (born 1988), American college baseball coach
- Paul Earley (born 1964), Irish sportsman
- Pete Earley (born 1951), American journalist and writer
- Richard Earley (born 1944), American diver
- Saxon Earley (born 2002), English footballer
- Sean Earley (1953–1992), American artist
- Sophie Earley (born 2006), Northern Irish table tennis player
- Tim Earley (born 1972), American poet
- Tom Earley (1917–1988), American baseball pitcher
- Tony Earley (born 1961), American writer
- William F. Earley (born 1943), American politician

== See also ==
- Early (name)
