= Early morning =

Early morning may refer to:

- the early part of the morning
- Early Morning, a 1968 play by Edward Bond
- "Early Morning" (song), a 1991 song
- "Early Morning", a song by Sonu Nigam, for the 2013 Indian film Chashme Baddoor; remixed by Ali Zafar along with rap of "Limitless"
- "Early Morning", a song by Charan Raj and Vijay Prakash, for the 2018 Indian film Dalapathi

== See also ==
- At Early Morning, a 1965 Soviet film
- Early in the Morning (disambiguation)
- Morning (disambiguation)
- Early (disambiguation)
