= Early =

Early may refer to:

== Places in the United States ==
- Early, Iowa, a city
- Early, Texas, a city
- Early Branch, a stream in Missouri
- Early County, Georgia
- Fort Early, Georgia, an early 19th century fort

== Music ==
- Early B, stage name of Jamaican dancehall and reggae deejay Earlando Arrington Neil (1957–1994)
- Early James, stage name of American singer-songwriter Fredrick Mullis Jr. (born 1993)
- Early (Scritti Politti album), 2005
- Early (A Certain Ratio album), 2002
- Early Records, a record label

== Other uses ==
- Early (name), a list of people and fictional characters with the given name or surname
- Early effect, an effect in transistor physics
- Early, a synonym for hotter in stellar classification

== See also ==
- The Earlies, a 21st-century band
- Earley (disambiguation)
- Earlie, a given name
