= Mourning (disambiguation) =

Mourning is grief over someone's death.

Mourning may also refer to:

== Music ==
- Mournin' (album), a 1972 album by Night Sun
- "Mourning" (Tantric song), 2001
- "Mourning" (Post Malone song), 2023
- Symphony No. 44 (Haydn), popularly known as Trauer ('mourning')
- "Mourn", a song by Sentenced from the album Frozen
- "Mourning", a song by Spiritbox.
- "Mournful Cameraderie", a song by The Caretaker from Everywhere at the End of Time (2017)

== People ==
- Alonzo Mourning (born 1970), American basketball player
- Wednesday Mourning, American actress and model
- Mourning Dove (author) (1884–1936), Native American author

== See also ==
- In Mourning (disambiguation)
- Morning (disambiguation)
