= Arthur Quinn =

Arthur Quinn may refer to:

- Arthur Quinn, the fictional protagonist of the Father of Lies Chronicles trilogy by Alan Early
- Arthur A. Quinn (1866 – 1957), an American labor union leader and politician
- Arthur H. Quinn (1875 – 1960), an American academic who specialised in American literature
