= A.N.S.W.E.R. =

U.S. anti-war, civil rights coalition

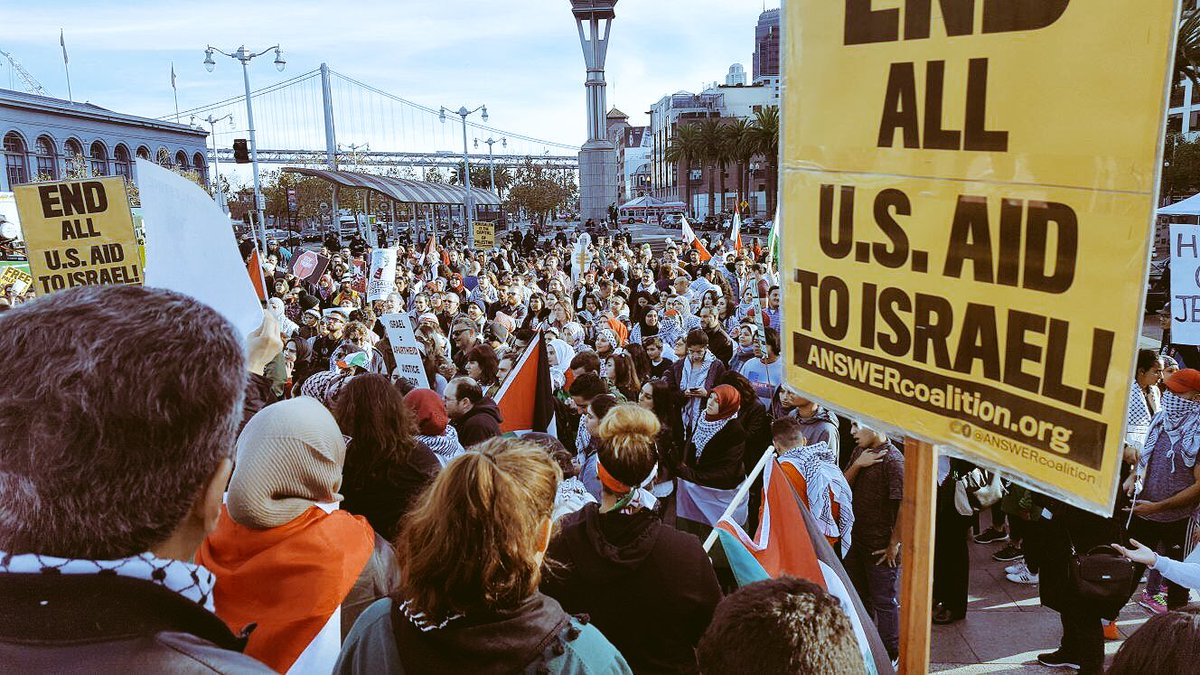
ANSWER placard is visible at this December 12, 2017 pro-Palestine rally in San Francisco

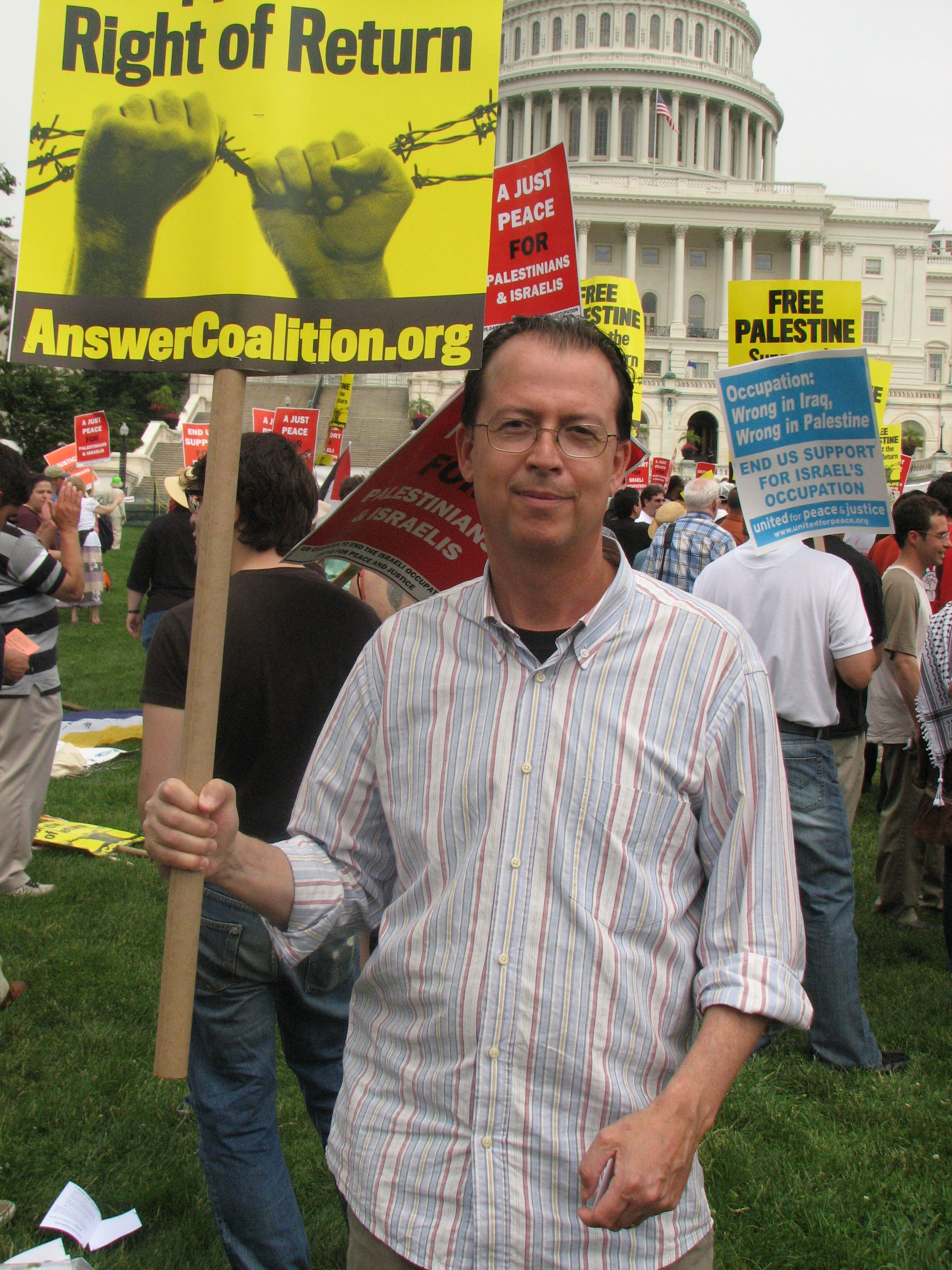
A.N.S.W.E.R. coordinator Brian Becker at a 2007 rally against Israeli occupation

Act Now to Stop War and End Racism (ANSWER), also known as International A.N.S.W.E.R. and the ANSWER Coalition, is a United States–based protest umbrella group consisting of many antiwar and civil rights organizations. Formed in the wake of the September 11th attacks, ANSWER has since helped to organize many of the largest anti-war demonstrations in the United States, including demonstrations of hundreds of thousands against the Iraq War. The group has also organized activities around a variety of other issues, ranging from the Israeli–Palestinian conflict to immigrant rights to Social Security to the extradition of Luis Posada Carriles.

ANSWER is closely associated with the Party for Socialism and Liberation and characterizes itself as anti-imperialist, and its steering committee consists of socialists, communists, civil rights advocates, and left-wing or progressive organizations from the Muslim, Arab, Palestinian, Filipino, Haitian, and Latin American communities.

ANSWER has faced criticism from other anti-war groups for its affiliations, tactics at demonstrations, and allegedly sectarian approach to joint anti-war work. It also faced criticism from various sources for its anti-Zionist politics.

== History ==
Many of ANSWER's lead organizers at its founding were also members of the Workers World Party (WWP) and its affiliate, the International Action Center.

After the Party for Socialism and Liberation (PSL) split from the WWP in 2004, ANSWER remained tightly tied to PSL. ANSWER's National Coordinator is Brian Becker, a PSL co-founder who said "we do a great deal of work through" ANSWER. A writer for The New Republic described ANSWER as a PSL "front group," and the two share significant infrastructural overlap.

== Major protest actions ==
=== 2001–02 ===
ANSWER's first major action was a September 29, 2001 "Anti-War, Anti-Racist" political rally and march in Washington, D.C., primarily in protest of the impending U.S. invasion of Afghanistan. An estimated 8,000 people participated.

The group's next major demonstration took place on April 20, 2002, which according to ANSWER's website, drew 100,000 people to Washington in the largest pro-Palestinian demonstration in U.S. history. On October 26 of that year, the group held a demonstration against Congress' vote to authorize the use of force against Iraq, which according to its website drew 100,000 in San Francisco and 200,000 in Washington, D.C.

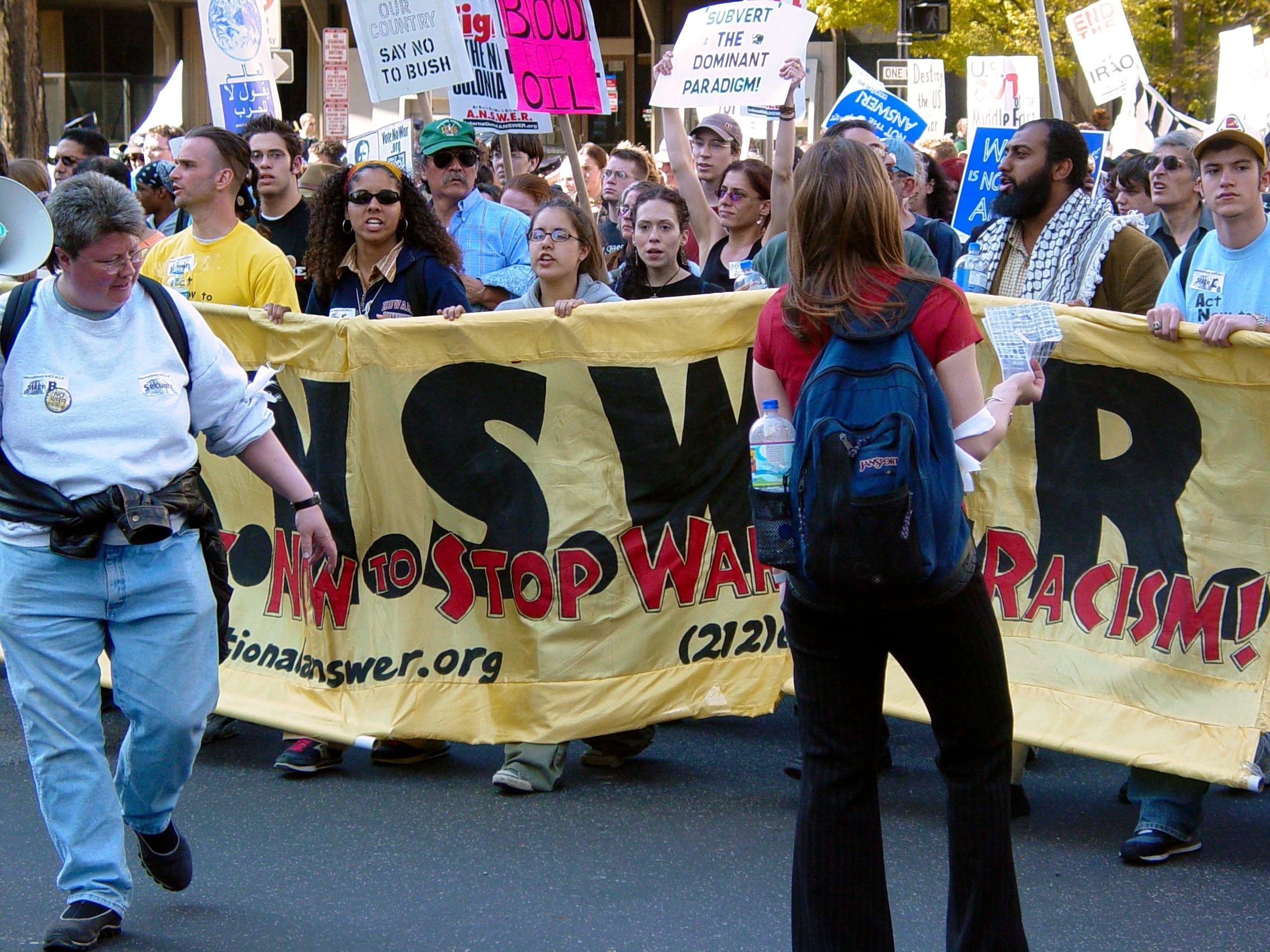
ANSWER banner at the head of an April 12, 2003, anti-war march in Washington, D.C.

=== 2003–04 ===
ANSWER called antiwar demonstrations on January 18, 2003, in Washington, D.C., and San Francisco, which were each attended by 200,000 people, according to the group's website. ANSWER was one of several groups organizing the U.S. component of the worldwide February 15, 2003 anti-war protest, which was, across the globe, the largest anti-war rally that has ever taken place. ANSWER sponsored emergency demonstrations just before the launch of the U.S. invasion of Iraq, on March 15, 2003, which according to its website drew 100,000 people each in San Francisco and Washington. With United for Peace and Justice (UFPJ), it cosponsored an anti-occupation protest in Washington on October 25 of that year which, again according to the group's website, brought out 100,000 people in Washington.

ANSWER called for national anti-war, pro-Palestinian, and anti-Haitian coup demonstrations on March 20, 2004, (the first anniversary of the invasion of Iraq). The protest in New York, cosponsored by UFPJ, was attended by 100,000 according to the ANSWER website. ANSWER participated in the March for Women's Lives on April 25, and the protests of the 2004 Republican National Convention from August 30 to September 2.

=== 2005–06 ===
ANSWER and UFPJ jointly sponsored a rally in Washington, D.C., on September 24, 2005, with attendance estimated by police at 150,000 and by organizers at 300,000 people.

ANSWER was involved with demonstrations on May Day, 2006, in support of rights for undocumented immigrants, which brought out several million people across the U.S. These protests were organized by a number of groups unrelated to ANSWER as well.

In late June 2006, ANSWER organized and participated in local rallies against the Israeli invasion of Gaza. Shortly after Israel invaded Lebanon two weeks later, ANSWER—along with the National Council of Arab Americans and the Muslim American Society—initiated a call for protests on August 12, 2006, against the "U.S.-Israeli War on the People of Lebanon and Palestine." Organizers estimated that the August 12 demonstrations drew 30,000 protesters in Washington, 10,000 in San Francisco, and 5,000 in Los Angeles.

=== 2007–2010 ===
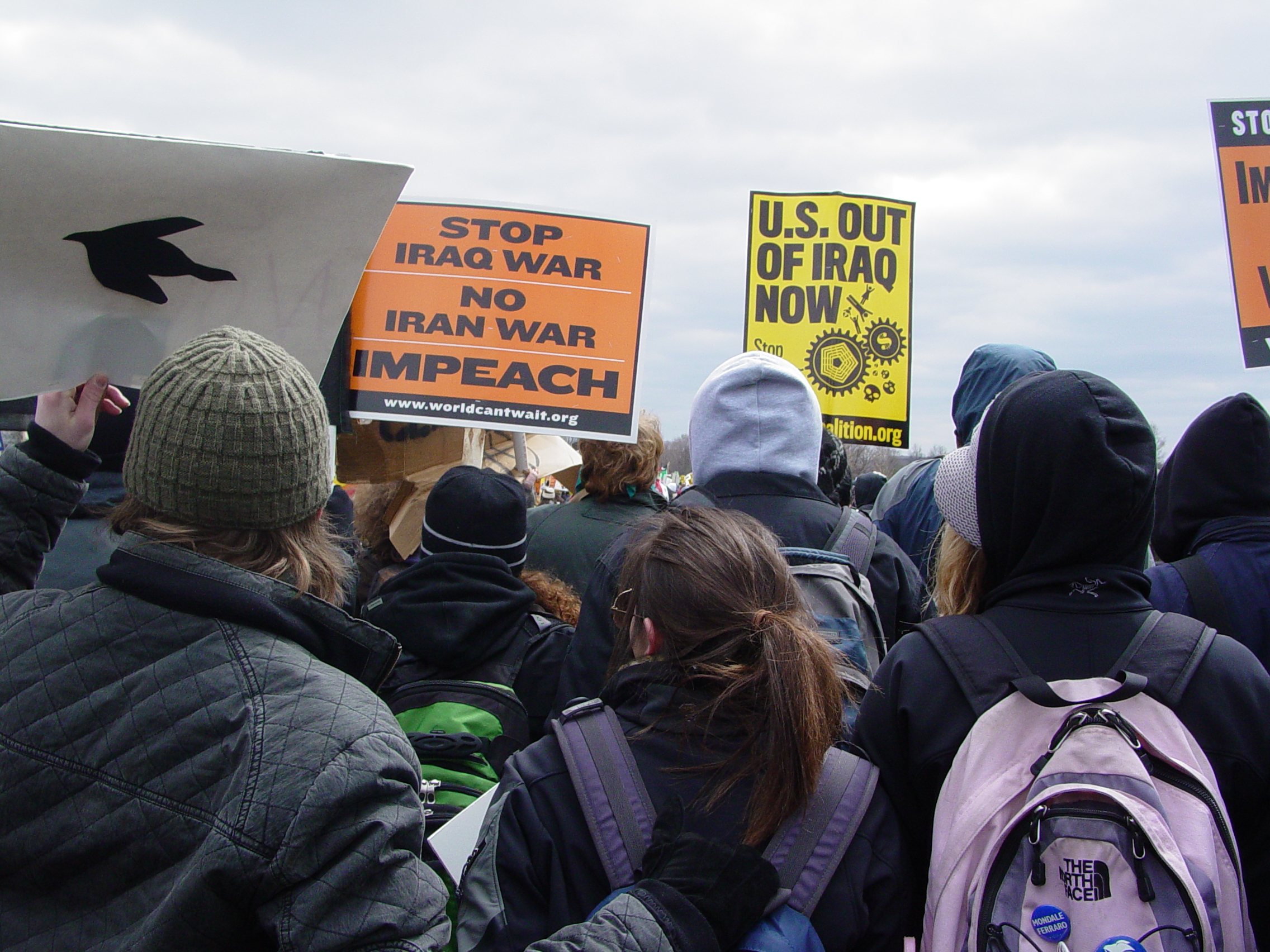
Marching during the March 17, 2007 anti-war protest in Washington, D.C.

ANSWER called national antiwar demonstrations in San Francisco and Washington, D.C., for September 15, 2007. According to the group, the attendance was 100,000.

ANSWER joined with other groups to organize the March 20, 2010 anti-war protest in Washington, D.C.

=== 2010–2020 ===
In response to the escalating tensions in Iraq between U.S. military and diplomats and Iraqi shia militias in correspondence with Iran, ANSWER called for a national demonstration against war in Iraq and aggression against Iran. The call for the demonstrations was made public via social media on January 1, 2020, but the importance of the proposed demonstrations on January 3, 2020, when the U.S. targeted and bombed a convoy of vehicles in the Baghdad International Airport, killing the Iranian general Qasem Soleimani and several key figures in the Iraqi Popular Mobilization Forces, including the militia's Deputy Chairman Abu Mahdi al-Muhandis. On January 4, 2020, over 70 demonstrations, led by ANSWER and other organizations in coordination with ANSWER, took place across the United States. Demonstrations ranged from smaller in size in small cities to large gatherings in cities like New York City and Chicago. The Washington, D.C., demonstration included actress Jane Fonda.

=== Since 2021 ===
ANSWER has increasingly turned its attention to the growing conflict between the U.S. and the People's Republic of China. Brian Becker, the National Director of the ANSWER Coalition, is an endorser of the organization "Pivot to Peace" mission statement, which is an organization of "concerned Americans from all walks of life who have come together in opposition to the dramatically increasing drive toward confrontation between the United States and China." They have also worked with "No Cold War" on events, including their webinar, "For a Peaceful Pacific," which featured ANSWER organizer Derek Ford.

After several Asian women were killed in a hate crime in Atlanta on March 16, 2021, the ANSWER Coalition organized a nationwide day of action to protest the anti-Asian hate crime. ANSWER sees the hate crimes as "the result of the growing hostility towards China".

In March 2023, the ANSWER Coalition organized demonstrations in Washington, D.C., and other American cities against the "U.S. empire" in commemoration of "the 20th anniversary [...] of the criminal U.S.-invasion of Iraq." The demonstrations' major theme was protesting American involvement in the Russo-Ukrainian War after Russia's full-scale invasion a year earlier. The organization stated that "The Biden administration is determined to escalate the Ukraine war. The real goal of the massive arming and training of Ukrainian forces has nothing to do with the interests of Ukrainian, Russian or American people. The aim instead is to “weaken Russia” as stated by the U.S. Secretary of Defense himself, even at the risk of a catastrophic nuclear war that could end life on Earth."

In October and November 2023, the ANSWER Coalition joined with other groups such as the Palestinian Youth Movement to organize a series of protests across the USA. Prominent events included protests in New York City and Washington DC.

=== Attendance figures ===
ANSWER figures for the size of its March 2007, protest were higher than corresponding San Francisco Chronicle figures. ANSWER engaged in a public dispute with the San Francisco Chronicle about the size of that demonstration. ANSWER Western Regional Coordinator Richard Becker wrote in an op-ed:

While tens of thousands of spirited anti-war marchers were still entering the San Francisco Civic Center on Sunday, March 18... organizers got word that a Chronicle reporter covering the event had already determined that only 3,000 people were present... Mainstream media undercounting of progressive demonstrations is nothing new, but this one had a magician's touch.

Analyzing the width and pace of the march together with the time required for the march to pass a certain point, Becker argues that the Chronicle's estimate is "impossible".

Some on the left have also accused ANSWER of exaggerating protest attendance. An October 2007 Socialist Worker editorial penned by Todd Chretien and republished on CounterPunch asserted: "Ask anyone who has worked with ANSWER, and they will tell you that its organizers always double the number of people at their marches. More recently, the multiplication factor has increased." Chretien describes this as "disorienting for the movement".

== Controversies ==
=== Relationships within the anti-war movement ===
For much of its history, few other prominent antiwar groups in the U.S. or elsewhere have had formal relationships with ANSWER, although many have participated in major ANSWER-sponsored protests.

During the protests against the U.S.-led invasions of Iraq and Afghanistan, there was much discussion among U.S. leftist opponents of those invasions, as to the degree to which they are or are not willing to work with ANSWER because of its affiliations.

Michael Albert and Stephen R. Shalom writing in Z magazine argue that regardless of the political views of some speakers at a major antiwar demonstration, "as long as other speakers can and do express positions with a different point of view, the overall impact of the event will still be positive, particularly in the absence of other options. Most of the people at the demonstration will in fact be unaware of exactly who said what and whether any particular speaker omitted this or that point. What they will experience will be a powerful antiwar protest. And most of the public will see it that way too."

==== Break with UFPJ ====
Although ANSWER worked with United for Peace and Justice (UFPJ) to build the September 24, 2005, Washington, D.C. rally, a December 2005 statement by the UFPJ Steering Committee says that UFPJ "has decided not to coordinate work with ANSWER again on a national level. The document cites three reasons for the decision:

1. ANSWER did not honor the agreed-upon time limits for its sections of the pre-march Rally...
2. ANSWER delayed the start of the March... and
3. ANSWER did not turn out many volunteers."

The document says that the UFPJ Steering Committee "did not have consensus" about the decision not to work with ANSWER, but had "a more than two thirds supermajority ... We make no recommendations or mandates on this issue to UFPJ member groups in local or constituency-based area..."

ANSWER responded by saying that "UFPJ has publicly proclaimed its intention to split the movement," and accused UFPJ of "a false and ugly attack on the ANSWER Coalition," and of doing so for "embarrassingly petty and astonishingly trivial" reasons. Besides giving their own version of the events surrounding September 24, ANSWER's statement indicates some less trivial differences between the groups: they criticize UFPJ for its willingness to support the ideas of mainstream politicians, such as John Murtha, who are disaffected with the war, while ANSWER "considers it harmful to try to tailor the message of the progressive movement to please the long-awaited but fictional support from the politicians". ANSWER asks, "Why is it that UFPJ's leadership can build a gushing "united front" with imperialist politicians but not the ANSWER Coalition, which has organized hundreds of thousands of people to promote genuine peace and self-determination?"

At considerable length, ANSWER argued that the current split has historical roots, dating back to "the first Iraq war of 1990–1991, [when] some of the same leadership forces now in UFPJ chose to create a second antiwar coalition and insisted on marching under the banner 'Economic Sanctions Not War' while some of those who are today in the leadership of ANSWER argued that economic sanctions were war—and a weapon of mass destruction at that. We contended that economic sanctions against Iraq would result in a form of genocide against the Iraqi people and that the only correct position for the U.S. antiwar movement was to demand, 'No war against Iraq.'... The economic sanctions ultimately took the lives of more than one million Iraqis, most of them children under the age of five, according to the UN's own statistics... The question for the antiwar movement is this: are we building a movement that comprehensively challenges imperialism or are we opposed only to certain tactics employed by imperialism such as overt, unilateral military invasion?"

Regarding the prospects of working again with UFPJ, ANSWER wrote, "[we regard] the united front that was formed at [our] initiative to have been remarkably successful," and later, "Different groups may have different slogans on their banners, but they should try to overcome the forces of division so as to march shoulder to shoulder against the real enemy."

Although the language of the UFPJ Steering Committee statement makes the break appear definitive, they have published similar statements (rejecting future work with ANSWER) in the past, only to later agree to united demonstrations. A May 2005 decision to the same effect—announcing a September 24 demonstration separate from the one initiated by ANSWER—was reversed when UFPJ agreed to a united antiwar demonstration. Previous united demonstrations between the two groups took place on October 25, 2003, and March 20, 2004.

=== Anti-Zionism and allegations of antisemitism ===
The Anti-Defamation League has criticized ANSWER for its support of Hezbollah and Hamas and of attacks on Israelis by those and other groups, as well as its anti-Zionist stance. It also characterized ANSWER as fostering an antisemitic environment at some of its rallies, citing examples of signs held by attendees promoting antisemitic conspiracy theories and demonizing Israel. The Stephen Roth Institute has said "Anti-Israel and antisemitic content has marked some ANSWER events."

The May–June 2003 issue of Tikkun, a progressive magazine of Jewish interests, contained a special section entitled Authoritarianism and Anti-Semitism in the Anti-War Movement? According to Tikkun, "many Jews report that they were encountering what they perceived to be anti-Semitism at anti-war demonstrations organized by International A.N.S.W.E.R." Tikkun described the perceptions of antisemitism as based on Israel being singled out for criticism and A.N.S.W.E.R.'s refusal to "acknowledge or support the right of the Jewish people to national self-determination."

According to A.N.S.W.E.R.: "There are those within the Jewish political establishment who charge anti-Semitism against any who dare condemn these terrible acts, or who condemn Israel fundamentally. But being opposed to Zionism is not the same as being anti-Semitic."

ANSWER works with Jewish Voice for Peace and other Jewish groups opposed to Israel.

=== Immigration and May Day 2006 ===
In addition to anti-war activism, ANSWER is involved in advocacy for rights for undocumented immigrants, believing that all immigration should be legal. ANSWER became involved in immigrant rights activism through protests against Save Our State, a California-based anti-undocumented immigration protest group, and the Minutemen Project, a group which patrols the U.S.-Mexico border to prevent illegal border crossings, and which ANSWER views as practicing racist vigilantism. These protests began soon after the founding of the Minutemen group in April 2005. ANSWER has not usually been the primary organizer of these protests but has actively supported them. For example, ANSWER helped organize counter-protests of rallies held by right-wing groups in Alhambra, California, on June 21, 2005; in Sacramento, California, on August 29, 2005; in Los Angeles on January 7, 2006; and in Burbank, California, on January 21, 2006.

ANSWER has also been involved in the much larger demonstrations in opposition to the Sensenbrenner Bill and support of legalization for undocumented immigrants that have occurred across the United States since March 2006. ANSWER was not the primary organizer of the initial large protests in Chicago, Los Angeles, and Dallas in late March and early April, but endorsed them. ANSWER was more prominent in the promotion of a May Day "Day Without An Immigrant" strike and boycott, because this call was controversial within the immigrant rights movement, contributing to a growing division between its left-wing advocates and moderates who believed a strike and boycott would be counterproductive.

ANSWER's position on the left side of this issue led to criticism; Jaime Contreras, president of the National Capital Immigrant Coalition and chairman of the local Service Employees International Union in Washington, D.C., told The Washington Post regarding ANSWER: "Groups... that have done nothing on immigration have no reason to stick their nose where it doesn't belong... They have no business saying, 'Let's do a strike' when it will create a humongous burden on immigrant groups. They need to stay in their box." Brian Becker, ANSWER's national coordinator, responded that ANSWER has in fact been involved in immigration in the long term, and that "We are just part of the coalition; we are not spearheading it at all... Whatever the immigrant rights community calls for is what we support."

=== Conflict with D.C. city government over posters ===
In August 2007, the D.C. Department of Public Works claimed that ANSWER broke city ordinances by putting signs, advertising a September 15 antiwar march, on utility boxes and using an adhesive that is difficult to remove. Additionally, the National Park Service, which administers many of the parks in the District of Columbia, claimed that the signs were defacement of federal property and ordered the group to remove the signs or pay for their removal. ANSWER refused to remove the signs, stating that the adhesive used was legal, water-soluble paste and the city's actions were "politically motivated". The group said any fines would be without legal basis, and they would appeal if fines were imposed. ANSWER sued the city in federal court to stop the city from enforcing its laws until it creates a "constitutionally allowable and non-discriminating system" for determining the rules on sign posting. An ANSWER spokeswoman stated that they gained support from the publicity and intended to continue to post more posters, stickers, and banners despite the efforts of the city.

== See also ==
- List of anti-war organizations
- List of peace activists
- Peta Lindsay
- Eugene Puryear
- Party for Socialism and Liberation
- Stop the War Coalition
- Stop the War Coalition (Australia)
