= Senator Early =

Senator Early may refer to:

- Edward Early (born 1935), Pennsylvania State Senate
- John Early (Illinois politician) (1828–1877), Illinois State Senate
- Nathaniel B. Early (1866–1947), Virginia State Senate
- Peter Early (1773–1817), Georgia State Senate

== See also ==
- William F. Earley (born 1943), South Dakota State Senate
