= Early Branch =

Stream in the American state of Missouri

Coordinates: 39°30′08″N 91°11′11″W

Early Branch is a stream in Pike County in the U.S. state of Missouri. It is a tributary of Sugar Creek.

Early Branch has the name of Henry Early, a pioneer settler.

== See also ==
- List of rivers of Missouri
