= Earley (disambiguation) =

Earley is a town in England.

Earley may also refer to:

- Earley (surname), a list of people with the surname Earley
- Earley (given name), a variant of the given name Earlene
- Earley Lake, a lake in Minnesota
- Earley parser, an algorithm
- Earley and Company, a stained glass manufacturer
