= Tim Earley =

American poet

- Born: Timothy Darren Earley; 1972 (age 53–54); Forest City, North Carolina
- Education: University of Alabama
- Occupations: Poet and teacher
- Writing career
- Genre: Poetry
- Notable works: "Boondoggle" and "The Spooking of Mavens"
- Website: www.olemiss.edu/people/tdearley

Tim Earley (born 1972 in Forest City, North Carolina) is an American poet. He is the author of four collections of poems, Boondoggle (Main Street Rag, 2005), The Spooking of Mavens (Cracked Slab Books, 2010), Poems Descriptive of Rural Life and Scenery (Horse Less Press, 2014), and Linthead Stomp (Horse Less Press, 2016).

== Early life ==
Timothy Darren Earley was born and raised in Western North Carolina.

== Education ==
He holds an M.F.A. in creative writing from the University of Alabama.

== Career ==
His work has appeared in the Chicago Review, jubilat, the Southern Humanities Review, and the Green Mountains Review. His work has been featured in Literary Trails of the North Carolina Mountains (University of North Carolina at Chapel Hill Press, 2007), The Ecopoetry Anthology (Trinity University Press), edited by Ann Fisher-Wirth and Laura-Gray Street, and Hick Poetics (Lost Roads Press, 2015), edited by Abraham Smith and Shelly Taylor. The collection Poems Descriptive of Rural Life and Scenery was published by Horseless Press in early 2014; Seth Abramson, in a review in The Huffington Post, referred to Earley as a "Southern Seer" and said he "is a master of anaphora, Biblical rhythms, revelatory testimony, tell-it-slant aggression, and juxtapositive imagery that borrows heavily from the Southern lexicon", his poetry "not merely urgent but dam-broken".

== Personal life ==
Earley moved to Denver, CO in 2015. Previously, he lived in Oxford, Mississippi.

== Awards ==
- AWP Intro/Journals Award
- 1998-1999 Writing Fellowship, Fine Arts Work Center, Provincetown
- 2002-2003 Writing Fellowship, Fine Arts Work Center, Provincetown
- 2015 Mississippi Institute of Arts and Letters Poetry Award Winner

== Selected bibliography ==
=== Collections ===
- Earley, Tim (2005). Boondoggle: poems. Charlotte, North Carolina: Main Street Rag Publishing Company. ISBN 9781930907959.
- Earley, Tim (2010). The spooking of mavens. Chicago, Illinois: Cracked Slab Books. ISBN 9780978644055.
- Earley, Tim (2014). Poems descriptive of rural life and scenery. Grand Rapids, Michigan: Horse Less Press. OCLC 878421220. ISBN 9780982989661.
- Earley, Tim (2016). The Center is Barbaric the Periphery is Without Lights. Doublecross Press.
- Earley, Tim (2016). Linthead Stomp. Grand Rapids, Michigan: Horse Less Press.

=== Work available online ===
- Boondoggle
- What's Happening
