= Sugar Creek (Salt River tributary) =

Stream in the American state of Missouri

Coordinates: 39.498379°N 91.168752°W

Sugar Creek is a stream in Pike County in the U.S. state of Missouri. It is a tributary of the Salt River.

Sugar Creek was so named on account of sugar maple timber near its course.

== See also ==
- List of rivers of Missouri
