= Sean Earley =

Sean Earley (May 7, 1953 - May, 1992) was an American artist who resided mostly in Texas. In addition to his fine art, mostly oil on canvas, he worked as a commercial illustrator.

His work has appeared in the Texas Monthly and has been exhibited at the Whitney Museum and Houston Texas' Alternative Museum. He is widely thought to have died of complications from AIDS.
