= In Mourning =

In Mourning may refer to:

- In Mourning (band), a Swedish band
- In Mourning, a 1996 album by Brutality

== See also ==
- Mourning, grief over someone's death
- "In the Mourning", a 2011 song by Paramore
