= John Early =

John Early may refer to:

- John Early (bishop) (1786–1873), American Methodist prelate in Lynchburg, cousin of the Virginia politician
- John Early (educator) (1814–1873), Irish-American Jesuit educator
- John Early (Virginia politician) (1757–1804), planter, military officer and politician in Franklin County
- John Early (Illinois politician) (1828–1877), lieutenant governor of Illinois
- John Early (comedian) (born 1988), American comedian and actor

== See also ==
- John Earle (disambiguation)
