= Alan Early =

Irish writer

- Born: 1983 (age 42–43)
- Occupations: Writer, graphic designer
- Writing career
- Period: 2011–present
- Website: www.alanearly.com

Alan Early (born 1983) is an Irish writer known, for his young adult fantasy trilogy, the Father of Lies Chronicles. He grew up in Mohill, County Leitrim, studied in the National Film School at Dún Laoghaire Institute of Art, Design and Technology and then later studied Moving Image Design at National College of Art and Design. He works as a graphic designer.

== Bibliography ==
=== Father of Lies Chronicles ===
1. Arthur Quinn and the World Serpent (2011)
2. Arthur Quinn and the Fenris Wolf (2012)
3. Arthur Quinn and Hell's Keeper (2013)
