= United for Peace and Justice =

US coalition of peace organizations

The United for Peace and Justice logo

United for Peace and Justice (UFPJ) is a coalition of more than 1,300 international and U.S.-based organizations opposed to "our government's policy of permanent warfare and empire-building."

The organization was founded in October 2002 during the build-up to the United States' 2003 invasion of Iraq by dozens of groups including the National Organization for Women, National Council of Churches, Peace Action, the American Friends Service Committee, Black Voices for Peace, Not In Our Name, Nodutdol, September Eleventh Families for Peaceful Tomorrows, and Veterans for Peace. Its first joint action was anti-war protests on International Human Rights Day, December 10, 2002. The direct precursor to UFPJ was "United We March!", initiated by Global Exchange, the Green Party of the United States, and others, which organized the April 20, 2002, demonstration against the U.S. invasion of Afghanistan.

UFPJ primarily organizes large-scale protests. The group separates its work into seven issue campaigns: Iraq, counter-military recruitment, global justice, nuclear disarmament, Palestine–Israel, civil liberties–immigrant rights and faith-based organizing.

UFPJ's most recent major rally and march was in Washington, D.C., on January 27, 2007. Among the featured speakers were several celebrities including Jane Fonda.

UFPJ's previous major action occurred from September 24 to 26, 2005, in Washington, D.C. UFPJ called the protest "End the War on Iraq!" On September 24, there was a march and rally, co-sponsored with the ANSWER Coalition, followed by a festival. Although exact numbers are never known, the organizers estimated that hundreds of thousands of people attended these events; the NYCLU says 300,000 attended the march. On September 25, there was an interfaith service and grassroots training. The final day, September 26, was devoted to lobbying Congress and to nonviolent direct action and civil disobedience. Roughly 370 were arrested for blocking the entrance to the White House, demanding to meet with George W. Bush.

== Previous protests ==
Some of UFPJ's protests include:

- Its first protest, on February 15, 2003, in front of the United Nations headquarters in New York City and entitled "The World Says No to War." The protest drew over 500,000 people.
- Its second major protest, held on March 20, 2004, to commemorate the first anniversary of the U.S.' attack on Iraq. The event drew over 100,000 people in New York City, plus nearly two million in 700 other cities.
- In 2004, the organization wanted to hold a rally on the Great Lawn of Central Park in opposition to the continued occupation of Iraq. The City denied UFPJ's application for a permit, on the basis that a mass gathering on the Great Lawn would be harmful to the grass, and that such damage would make it harder to collect private donations to maintain the Park. UFPJ charged that Mayor Michael Bloomberg was willing to allow other large gatherings on the Great Lawn, but was discriminating against the demonstration so as to curry favor with the Republican Party, which was holding its quadrennial convention in New York City. Nevertheless, a court rejected UFPJ's challenge to the denial of the permit. The major protest was eventually held elsewhere, on Sunday, August 29, 2004, the eve of the 2004 Republican National Convention in New York City. The event drew over 500,000 people, according to The New York Times, and received lead coverage (including a double-sized, vertical front page in New York Newsday) in every major newspaper. In March, 2007 NYPD Deputy Commissioner Paul Browne stated about the RNC protests: "You certainly had 800,000 on August 29th."
- On January 27, 2007, a protest of the Iraq war was held in Washington, D.C., with approximately 400,000 people participating.

== Unity statement ==
UFPJ's lengthy Unity Statement begins by asserting their opposition to the "pre-emptive wars of aggression waged by the Bush administration" and the "drive to expand U.S. control over other nations and strip us of our rights at home under the cover of fighting terrorism and spreading democracy." It then echoes the rhetoric of Not in Our Name (founded six months earlier and itself a member of UFPJ) stating, "we say NO to [the U.S.'s] use of war and racism to concentrate power in the hands of the few, at home and abroad."

It goes on to call for "a broad mass movement for peace and justice" and, in particular, for "peaceful resolution of disputes amongst states; respect for national sovereignty, international law, and the Universal Declaration of Human Rights; the defense and extension of basic democratic freedoms to all; social and economic justice; and the use of public spending to meet human and environmental needs."

UFPJ explicitly positions itself as not being a single-issue organization: "We envision UFPJ as a movement-building coalition that coordinates and supports the work of existing groups and builds linkages and solidarity where none exist. We will link the wars abroad with the assaults at home, and U.S. militarism to the corporate economic interests it serves."

The statement lays out the intent of following these principles internally to UFPJ itself: "We will pay special attention in all aspects of our work to the inclusion and leadership of constituencies bearing the brunt of the war’s impact at home, such as people of color, youth, women, and workers. We will be pro-active in addressing internal power dynamics within our movement..." Further, the group pledges itself to non-violence.

The statement continues with a critique of U.S. government conduct, above all, with respect to the justification, preparation, and execution of the 2003 invasion of Iraq and the subsequent occupation, including criticism of the media and the Democratic Party for "refus[ing] to challenge them." It argues that, "the war on Iraq was the leading edge of a relentless drive for U.S. empire... [e]xploiting the tragedy of September 11, 2001..." for that purpose and to "impose right-wing policies at home under the cover of fighting terrorism."

The critique is then broadened to much of U.S. foreign policy, nuclear weapons policy, racial profiling, detention of immigrants, and other abuses in domestic law enforcement, singling out the USA PATRIOT Act and the "even more draconian" PATRIOT Act II. It also assails the damage that a war budget and "tax cuts for the wealthy" have done to domestic programs such as Medicaid and even veterans' benefits, then states, "Military recruiters are aggressively targeting low-income students, predominantly people of color, who, because they are denied access to good schools and decent jobs, have few alternatives to poverty or incarceration other than joining the military."

== Criticism ==
One critic claimed UFPJ is overly supportive of the Democratic Party. However, UFPJ had sponsored protests outside the Democratic National Convention in July 2004, calling for an "emphatic rejection of the Democratic 'leadership' that supported the war." In 2006, UFPJ, and many of its member groups, participated in the Voters for Peace campaign, a pledge which states, "I will only vote for or support federal candidates who publicly commit to a speedy end to the Iraq war, and to preventing future 'wars of aggression'."

Another critic has criticized the hierarchy, as he perceives it, within the New York City based leadership of UFPJ. He also stated that "term limits must be enforced if the office of [UFPJ's] national coordinator is to be continued."

== "No Stolen Elections!" campaign ==
In September 2004, UFPJ joined with the Liberty Tree Foundation for the Democratic Revolution, Code Pink, and Global Exchange to launch the "No Stolen Elections!" campaign. Participants were invited to join in signing a pledge that began, "I remember the stolen presidential election of 2000 and I am willing to take action in 2004 if the election is stolen again." The campaign stated that it would prepare for widespread protest and civil disobedience in the event of significant fraud in the 2004 election. On November 3, tens of thousands of people, demonstrating in over 80 cities, protested purported vote suppression and mechanical irregularities in Ohio and other states.

== Sharp disagreement with ANSWER ==
Although UFPJ worked with A.N.S.W.E.R. to build the September 24, 2005, Washington, D.C., rally, by December 2005 the two groups had definitively fallen out. A December 2005 statement by UFPJ says that "engagement with A.N.S.W.E.R.… [has been] …a difficult and controversial aspect of our work," and that UFPJ "has decided not to coordinate work with ANSWER again on a national level." The document discusses events surrounding the September 24 rally, charges that A.N.S.W.E.R. "violated the terms of our agreement in ways that substantially and negatively impacted September 24’s message and impact," remarks that "co-sponsorship with ANSWER on September 24 was welcomed by some in the antiwar movement but limited or prevented completely the participation of others," and explains, "We did not have consensus" about the decision not to work with A.N.S.W.E.R., but had "a more than two thirds supermajority … We make no recommendations or mandates on this issue to UFPJ member groups in local or constituency-based area…"

A.N.S.W.E.R. responded by saying that "UFPJ has publicly proclaimed its intention to split the movement," and accused UFPJ of "a false and ugly attack on the A.N.S.W.E.R. Coalition," and of doing so for "embarrassingly petty and astonishingly trivial" reasons. Besides giving their own version of the events surrounding September 24, A.N.S.W.E.R.'s statement indicates some less trivial differences between the groups: they criticize UFPJ for its willingness to embrace even moderate politicians, such as John Murtha, who are disaffected with the war, while A.N.S.W.E.R. "considers it harmful to try to tailor the message of the progressive movement to please the long-awaited but fictional support from the politicians."

== See also ==
- List of anti-war organizations
