= Lydia Sargent =

American feminist (1942–2020)

- Born: January 10, 1942
- Died: 27 September 2020 (aged 78)

Lydia Sargent (January 10, 1942 – September 27, 2020) was an American feminist, writer, author, playwright, and actor.

== Biography ==
She was a founder and original member of the South End Press Collective, as well as Z Magazine, which she co-edited and co-produced. She organized the Z Communications Institute every year and taught classes there. She was also a member of the interim consultative committee of the International Organization for a Participatory Society.

Her plays include I Read About My Death in Vogue Magazine and Playbook with Maxine Klein and Howard Zinn. She edited Women and Revolution: The Unhappy Marriage of Marxism and Feminism, which features a lead essay by Heidi Hartmann. Sargent wrote the long-running "Hotel Satire" column for Z Magazine, "where gals come to learn their true purpose on this earth, i.e., to service men".
