= Earlie =

Earlie is a masculine given name which may refer to:

- Earlie Fires (born 1947), American jockey
- Earlie Thomas (1945–2022), American National Football League player
- Earlie Endris Thorpe (1924–1989), American history professor and clergyman

== See also ==
- Earlie Formation, a Canadian geologic formation
