= William F. Earley =

American politician

Member of the South Dakota Senate from the 12th district
- In office 2003–2006

Member of the South Dakota House of Representatives from the 12th district
- In office 1999–2000

Personal details
- Born: February 3, 1943 (age 83) Sioux Falls, South Dakota
- Party: Republican
- Spouse: Beverly
- Children: four
- Profession: executive

William F. Earley (born February 3, 1943) is an American former politician. He served in the South Dakota House of Representatives from 1999 to 2000 and in the Senate from 2003 to 2006.
