= Steve Early =

English boxer (born 1956)

Personal information
- Nationality: British
- Born: Steve Early; 7 May 1956 (age 70) Coventry, England
- Weight: Light Welterweight

Boxing career

Boxing record
- Total fights: 29
- Wins: 25
- Win by KO: 12
- Losses: 4
- Draws: 0
- No contests: 0

Steve Early (born 7 May 1956) is a professional boxer, who fought out of Coventry, England. Early started his career in 1977 with a TKO win over Kevin Sheehan.

Early marched on to thirteen consecutive wins in three years, in November 1979 Early suffered his first professional defeat to Roger Guest in a BBBoC Midlands area Light Welterweight title bout. Early was floored in the first round and counted out by the referee. Early later returned the favor and knocked out Guest in the fourth round of their second contest in 1981.

After the loss to Guest, Early bounced back to another 7 consecutive wins, including experienced fighters like Billy Waith with 94 bouts.

In 1981, Early stepped into the ring for a final eliminator contest for the BBBoC British light-welterweight title, with one of the most talented fighters of his era, Ken Buchanan. Early beat Buchanan after a hard-fought 12 rounds.

After beating Buchanan. Early eventually had the chance to take the British Light-Welterweight championship to Coventry. He stepped into the ring with champion Clinton McKenzie . After an exciting 3 rounds, McKenzie had put on the pressure and Early was saved by the referee in the fourth as in his opinion Earley was in no fit state to continue.

Yet again, over the next year, Early put another four wins and eventually retired after being defeated by Gary Night in London.
