= International Action Center =

The International Action Center (IAC) is an affiliate organization of the Marxist-Leninist Workers World Party whose members staff IAC. It was founded in 1992 by former United States Attorney General Ramsey Clark. IAC describes its political orientation as "anti-capitalist and anti-imperialist". It seeks the end of capitalism which it says is the cause of human suffering and claims that America victimizes and oppresses nonwhite minorities both at home and overseas.
