= Morning (disambiguation) =

The morning is the part of the day from either midnight or dawn to noon.

Morning(s) or The Morning may also refer to:

== Film, television and radio ==
- Morning (film), a 2010 American film by Leland Orser
- The Morning (film), a 1967 Yugoslav film
- A Morning, a Canadian morning television show 1997–2009
- CBS Mornings, a US breakfast television show on CBS
- CBS News Mornings, a US early breakfast television show on CBS
- Mornings (TV programme), a UK breakfast television show on Sky News
- "Mornings" (Master of None), a television episode
- Today Extra, formerly Mornings, an Australian morning television talk show
- Mornings (CBC Music), a Canadian morning radio program

== Music ==
=== Classical pieces ===
- "Morning Mood", often called "Morning", from Peer Gynt by Edvard Grieg, 1875
- Symphony No. 6 (Haydn), nicknamed "Morning", 1761

=== Albums ===
- Morning (Amel Larrieux album) or the title song, 2006
- Morning (Janice Vidal album) or the title song, 2009
- Morning (Kenny Drew album) or the title song, 1975
- The Morning (Andrew Osenga album), 2006
- The Morning (Lewis Watson album), 2014
- Morning (Mae EP), 2009
- Morning (Rhodes EP), 2014

=== Songs ===
- "Morning" (Clare Fischer composition), 1965
- "Morning" (Teyana Taylor and Kehlani song), 2019
- "The Morning" (song), by the Weeknd, 2011
- "Mornin'", by Al Jarreau from Jarreau, 1983
- "Morning", by Beck from Morning Phase, 2014
- "Morning", by G Flip from About Us, 2019
- "Morning", by I-dle from We Made, 2026
- "Morning", by Iron & Wine from Around the Well, 2009
- "Morning", by Mamamoo from Blue;s, 2018
- "Morning", by Val Doonican, 1972
- "Morning", by Wet Wet Wet from Picture This, 1995
- "Morning", by Zara Larsson from Poster Girl, 2021
- "Morning", written by Frank Lebby Stanton (lyrics) and Oley Speaks (music), 1910
- "The Morning", by Raekwon, Pusha T, Common, 2 Chainz, Cyhi the Prynce, Kid Cudi, and D'banj from Cruel Summer, 2012
- "The Morning", by Robert Forster from Inferno, 2019

== Other uses ==
- Morning (Hord), a sculpture by Donal Hord in San Diego, California, US
- Morning (magazine), a Japanese manga magazine published by Kodansha
- The Morning, a newspaper in Sri Lanka

== See also ==
- Mourning
