= ZNetwork =

Left-wing activist-oriented media group

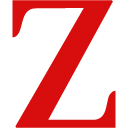
- Website type: Left news and analysis website
- Owners: The Institute for Social and Cultural Communications, Inc.
- Website: znetwork.org
- Commercial: No
- Registration: Optional
- Launched: 1995; 31 years ago
- Current status: Active

ZNetwork, formerly known as Z Communications, is a left-wing activist-oriented media group founded in 1986 by Michael Albert and Lydia Sargent. It is, in broad terms, ideologically libertarian socialist, anti-capitalist, and heavily influenced by participatory economics, although much of its content is focused on critical commentary of foreign affairs. Its publications include Z Magazine, ZNet, and Z Video. Since early November 2022, they have all been regrouped under the name ZNetwork.

== History ==
Zeta Magazine was founded by Michael Albert and Lydia Sargent in 1987, both of whom had previously co-founded South End Press. It was renamed Z Magazine in 1989.

Founded in 1994, Z Media Institute provides classes and other sessions in how to start and produce alternative media, how to better understand media, and how to develop organising skills. The institute has hosted Stephen Shalom presentations on parpolity a number of times.

Founded in 1995, ZNet (also known as ZNet, ZNetwork and Z Communications) is a website with contributors that include Noam Chomsky, Eduardo Galeano, Boris Kagarlitsky, Edward Said, Chris Spannos and Kevin Zeese. John Pilger described it as one of the best news sources online. Rene Milan of the Institute for Ethics and Emerging Technologies called the site a rich source of information about participism.

== Publications and authors ==
Z Magazine is published in print and on-line monthly.

Contributors to the magazine have included Patrick Bond Noam Chomsky,, Ward Churchill, Alexander Cockburn, Edward S. Herman, bell hooks, Mike Kuhlenbeck, Staughton Lynd, John Ross, Juliet Schor, Holly Sklar, Cornel West, Kevin Zeese and Howard Zinn. Articles written by Chomsky have been republished in the New Statesman.

== Reception ==
In a 2005 interview with Joshua Frank, Ward Churchill discussed issues he had with Z Magazine. Churchill said an article he worked on was not published for two years and was misattributed. He also felt Albert and Sargent had greater influence than others involved with the publication.

In 2012, George Monbiot wrote a critical article about the book The Politics of Genocide by Edward Herman and David Peterson. Znet published a response to Monbiot from Herman and Peterson. Monbiot said he asked Michael Albert to publish Martin Shaw's review of Herman and Peterson's book on Znet to balance the comments from Herman and Peterson. Albert refused.

== See also ==
- Alternative media (U.S. political left)
- Independent Media Centre
- Political cinema
- TeleSUR
