= Michael Albert =

Economist, activist, speaker, writer

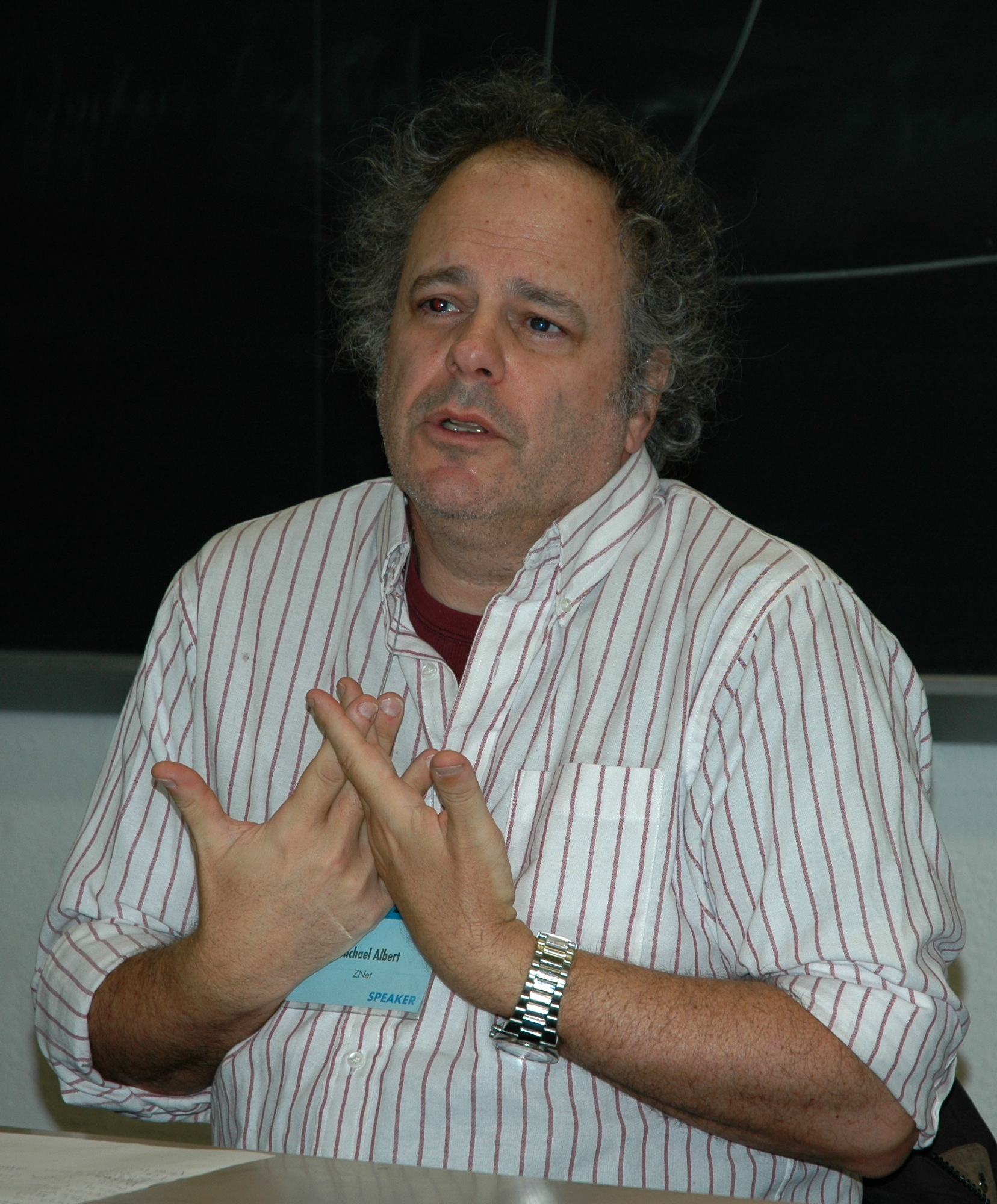
- Albert in 2007
- Born: April 8, 1947 (age 79); New York City, U.S.
- Education: Massachusetts Institute of Technology
- Occupations: Writer; Author; Lecturer
- Website: Michael Albert at ZNetwork

Michael Albert (born April 8, 1947) is an American economist, speaker, writer, and political critic. Since the late 1970s, he has published on a variety of subjects. He has set up his own media outfits, magazines, and podcasts. He is known for helping to develop the socioeconomic theory of participatory economics.

== Biography ==
Albert was born in New York City and grew up in New Rochelle, New York. In 1965, Albert was studying physics at MIT. He objected to the US military's funding of the university. This, along with the civil rights movement, led Albert to become politically active. He became a member of Students for a Democratic Society and opposed the Vietnam War. He was expelled from MIT, in January 1970, for disruptive behaviour, although he claimed the charges were 'cooked-up'.

Albert founded South End Press in 1977 along with Lydia Sargent and Juliet Schor, among others.

In 1987, Albert founded Zeta Magazine with Sargent. The magazine focused on libertarian and anarchist socialist thought. It was renamed Z Magazine in 1989.

In 1990–91, Albert and Robin Hahnel worked on outlining their ideas around participatory economics. They published Looking Forward and The Political Economy of Participatory Economics, with the latter including an economic model of the system. Doug Brown, writing in the Journal of Economic Issues said their alternative to markets was novel, but mainly of academic interest.

By 1995, the organisation Z Magazine had branched out providing online content and media training. Along with the magazine the ventures are collectively known as Z Communications.

In 2003, Parecon: Life After Capitalism was published further outlining participatory economics in a more accessible, less academic format. The book was translated into 20 languages. Reviewing the book Paul Ormerod felt Albert's criticisms of capitalism were unfounded. Albert spoke at the World Social Forum in the same year. He spoke at European Social Forum in 2004.

Albert was a founding member of the International Organization for a Participatory Society, in 2012.

Sean Michael Wilson created a comic book based on Albert and his ideas in 2013.

== Beliefs ==
Albert identifies himself as a market abolitionist and believes markets should be replaced with participatory economics.

== Criticism ==
In 2006, David Schweickart wrote a detailed critique of participatory economics called Nonsense on Stilts: Michael Albert's Parecon. He claimed three fundamental features of the economic system are flawed.

== Bibliography ==
- What Is To Be Undone?, (1974)
- Stop the Killing Train: Radical Visions for Radical Change, (1994)
- Thinking Forward: Learning To Conceptualize Economic Vision, (1997)
- Moving Forward: Program for a Participatory Economy, (2001)
- The Trajectory of Change: Activist Strategies for Social Transformation, (2002)
- Parecon: Life After Capitalism, (2003) Verso ISBN 978-1844675050
- Thought Dreams: Radical Theory for the 21st Century, (2003) Verso
- Realizing Hope: Life beyond Capitalism, (2006)
- Remembering Tomorrow: From SDS to Life After Capitalism, A Memoir, (2007) Seven Stories Press ISBN 978-1583227428
- Occupy Theory (2013)
- Occupy Vision (2013)
- Occupy Strategy (2013)
- Practical Utopia: Strategies for a Desirable Society, preface by Noam Chomsky (2017) PM Press/Kairos ISBN 978-1629633817
- No bosses (2021)

=== Co-authored ===
- Unorthodox Marxism, with R. Hahnel (1978)
- Socialism Today and Tomorrow, with R. Hahnel (1981)
- Marxism and Socialist Theory, with R. Hahnel (1981)
- Liberating Theory, with Holly Sklar, Lydia Sargent, Mel King, Robin Hahnel, Noam Chomsky and Leslie Cagan (1986)
- Talking about a Revolution: Interviews with Michael Albert, Noam Chomsky, Barbara Ehrenreich, Bell Hooks, Peter Kwong, Winona LaDuke, Manning Marable, Urvashi Vaid, Howard Zinn (1998)
- Quiet Revolution in Welfare Economics, with R. Hahnel (1990) Princeton University Press, ISBN 978-0691604510
- Looking Forward: Participatory Economics for the Twenty First Century, with R. Hahnel (1990)
- The Political Economy of Participatory Economics, with R. Hahnel (1991) Princeton University Press, ISBN 978-0691003849

== See also ==
- Participatory politics
- Welfare economics
