= Stephen Shalom =

American political scientist and writer

Stephen Rosskamm Shalom is a professor of political science at William Paterson University where he has taught since 1977. He is a writer on social and political issues and is a contributor to Znet and Democratic Left. He is on the editorial boards of the Bulletin of Concerned Asian Scholars and the journal New Politics.

Shalom earned his Bachelor's degree from M.I.T., and his Ph.D. in Political Science from Boston University.

== Publications ==
He is the author of numerous publications on the Philippines and other political topics including Which Side Are You On?: An Introduction to Politics (Longman, 2002), Imperial Alibis: Rationalizing U.S. Intervention After the Cold War (South End Press, 1993), Deaths in China due to communism propaganda versus reality (1984); The United States and the Philippines: A Study of Neocolonialism (1981); co-editor of The Philippines Reader (South End Press, 1987), Bitter Flowers, Sweet Flowers: East Timor, Indonesia, and the World Community (Rowman & Littlefield, 2001); and editor of Socialist Visions (South End Press, 1983) and Perilous Power: The Middle East & U.S. Foreign Policy: Dialogues on Terror, Democracy, War, and Justice by Noam Chomsky and Gilbert Achcar (Paradigm Publishers, 2007).

He was a contributor to the book Real Utopia: Participatory Society for the 21st Century by Chris Spannos (2008).
