= Tiant =

Tiant is a surname. Notable people with the surname include:

- Luis Tiant (1940–2024), Cuban baseball player
- Luis Tiant Sr. (1906–1976), Cuban baseball player

== See also ==
- Tant
