= Halloween 2002 anti-war protest =

Protests in the UK and US against war in Iraq

On October 31, 2002, a series of anti-war and anti-capitalist protests, generally focusing on the planned war on Iraq, took place across the UK and the United States.

There is some dispute over who called and built the UK protests, the Stop the War Coalition attempted to co-opt the protests which were actually the results of work by various activists from differing socialist and anarchist strains and not just one campaign.

== United Kingdom ==
The first of the protests took place during the morning rush hour at the Menai Suspension Bridge between Anglesey and Wales blocking the traffic.

In London people dressed as ghosts marched on the Parliament of the United Kingdom and succeeded in projecting "No war on Iraq" on the Palace of Westminster, and took part in direct action against those corporations whom they perceived as likely to benefit from the war in Iraq.

According to the UK Independent Media Centre, "[a]round 150 different events included critical mass bike rides, occupations, and mass demonstrations in Brighton, Manchester, Glasgow and London and many other places." and " University occupations also took place at Manchester, Sheffield, Cambridge, Colchester Sixth Form, Brighton, SOAS and UCL and the LSE in London."

== United States ==
Protests in the US were against both the planned invasion of Iraq issue and the Free Trade Area of the Americas agreement then under negotiation.

== Disobedients ==
Disobedients was a network set up to protest the upcoming War on Iraq during 2002 and early 2003. It was a loose knit group of grass roots activists adopting the PGA hallmarks.

Protests it organised included the Halloween 2002 anti-war protest in London, and the Old Street Roundabout protest that occurred the day after the War in Iraq started.

== See also ==
- Protests against the Iraq War
