= Athens Banner-Herald =

Newspaper published in Athens, Georgia

- Type: Daily newspaper
- Format: Broadsheet
- Owner: USA Today Co.
- Editor-in-chief: Caitlyn Stroh-Page
- Director of Presentation/Assistant Editor: Bill Stewart
- Founded: March 20, 1832; 194 years ago (as the Southern Banner)
- Language: English
- Headquarters: 1 Press Pl, Ste 104, Athens, GA 30601
- City: Athens, Georgia
- Country: United States of America
- Circulation: 5,393 (daily); 7,896 (Sunday) (as of 2018)
- Website: onlineathens.com
- Free online archives

The Athens Banner-Herald is a daily newspaper in Athens, Georgia, United States, owned by USA Today Co. The paper has a Sunday special and publishes online under the name Online Athens.

== History ==
The newspaper traces its history to the Southern Banner newspaper which began publishing on March 20, 1832. The paper's masthead and owners were unchanged until 1872, when it was sold and the masthead changed to North-East Georgian and to Athens Weekly Georgian after sale, before returning to its original masthead in 1878. The title changed again with its merger with its rival the Southern Watchman to form the Athens Banner-Watchman in 1882. By 1886, it was owned and operated solely by T.L. Gantt. In 1889, the masthead became the Athens Weekly Banner for the weekly edition. This later became The Weekly Banner until the cessation of weekly editions in 1921.

In 1902, the daily newspaper, then called the Athens Daily Banner, became the Athens Banner under the ownership of H.J. Rowe. It continued under this title until 1923 when it merged with the Athens Daily Herald to become the Banner-Herald. This became the Athens Banner-Herald in 1933. Earl Braswell was the newspaper's publisher, a position he held until 1965.

In 1965, Billy and Charles Morris of Morris Communications purchased the newspaper. On June 17 that year, the weekly Athens Advertiser changed its name to the Athens Daily News and became a seven-day morning paper to compete with the afternoon Athens Banner-Herald. The Morris family purchased the rival paper on December 24, 1967, and consolidated its staff into the Athens Banner-Herald.

In 1991, the News and Banner-Herald moved into a new office at the corner of Thomas and Broad Streets. The building came to be known as The News Building. During this time, the Athens Banner-Herald established a web presence. In 1996, the newspapers started a web page, Athenaeum. The following year, the newspaper started OnlineAthens.com, its current web page. In 2001, the News and Banner-Herald merged into a single morning paper with the Banner-Herald name. In December 2011, Morris Communications reached an agreement to sell The News Building to Lulscal, LLC.

Morris sold the Banner-Herald to Gatehouse Media in August 2017. Two years later GateHouse merged with Gannett in November 2019.

== Notable staff ==
- Columnist Ed Tant
- Sportswriter Lewis Grizzard
