= Ed Tant =

Ed Tant is an American writer, journalist, and activist. He was a long-time columnist for the Athens Banner-Herald and is currently a columnist for Flagpole Magazine.

== Life and career ==
He attended the University of West Georgia and was involved in student activism there.

Tant has written for publications including the Athens Banner-Herald, Flagpole Magazine, Astronomy, and The Atlanta Constitution. He has been a nominee for the Georgia Writers Hall of Fame. In 2009, Tant contributed photographs to an exhibition at the Athens Institute for Contemporary Art about the role of media.

He worked as a security guard at the Georgia Museum of Art for seventeen years. The New York Times has published letters by Tant about his experience as a museum guard. In 2014, a couple donated a piece of art to the museum in honor of Tant.

Tant participated in protests against the Vietnam War in the late 1960s and in protests against the Iraq War in the early 2000s. He has been a volunteer at the Athens Human Rights Festival, whose guests have included David Dellinger and Lawrence Colburn.

He was arrested in New York while covering protests around the 2004 Republican National Convention as a columnist for the Athens Banner-Herald. The arrest of demonstrators and bystanders, including Tant, led to a successful class action lawsuit for false arrests.
