= Protests against the 2011 military intervention in Libya =

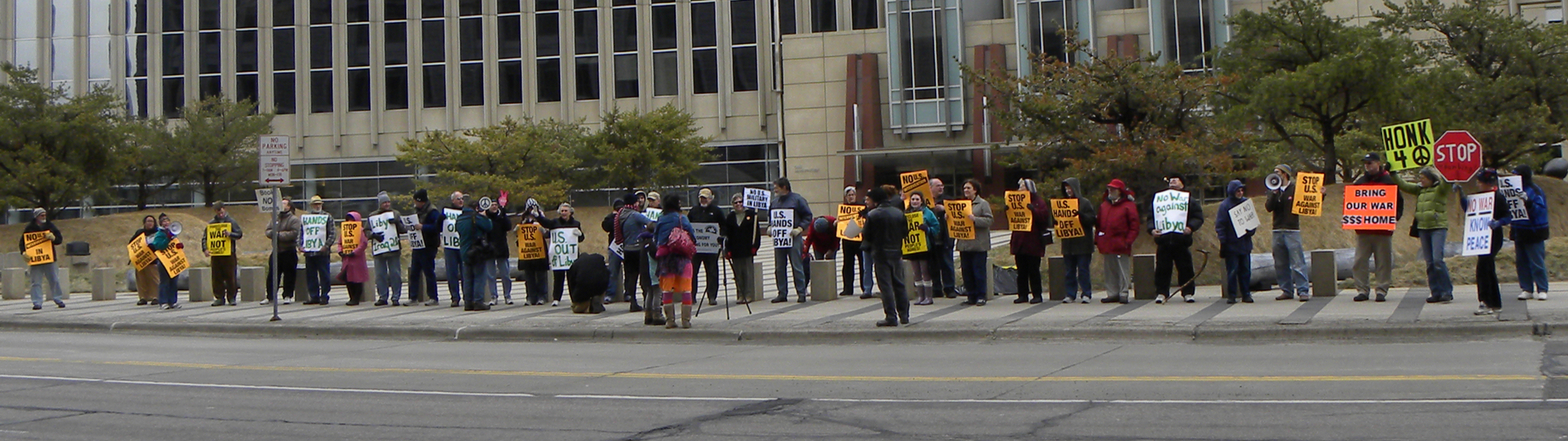
Protest in Minneapolis, Minnesota, United States, on March 21, 2011, against the American military intervention in Libya

Beginning on March 19, 2011, and continuing through the 2011 military intervention in Libya, anti-war protests against military intervention in Libya were held in many cities worldwide.

== March 2011 ==
=== Brazil ===
According to an article by Fabíola Ortiz on March 25 on the online magazine Upside Down World, two small protests were organized in Brazil against the decision for military intervention in Libya. On March 18, during the visit of Barack Obama to Brazil, a protest of about 200 people from social movements, the Workers' Party, the Brazilian Communist Party and the Democratic Labour Party was held in Rio de Janeiro. The demonstration was peaceful until it reached the U.S. consulate, when two molotov cocktails were thrown (injuring the building's security guard). The Military Police reacted by firing rubber bullets into the gathering, hurting a Rádio CBN reporter. Fourteen protestors were arrested.

=== Chile ===
In response to the US military intervention in Libya a demonstration was held in Chile's capital, Santiago, on March 20 protesting the visit by Barack Obama. Left-wing political parties, professors, students, human rights activists and other Chilean people participated in the demonstration.

=== Germany ===
On March 20, between 70 and 80 people (members of communist or anarchist German groups and immigrants) demonstrated in Hamburg against the attack on Libya under the banner "Yes to the revolt, No to the intervention". On March 21 nearly 200 people met in the city center of Duisburg, convoked by several leftist groups in a protest against the war in Libya and against nuclear power. Fifty demonstrators met in Tübingen on March 23, asking for an end to air raids in Libya.

=== Greece ===
On March 20, about 5000 supporters of the Communist Party of Greece (ΚΚΕ)—mainly high school and university students—protested outside the parliament building in central Athens against the government's support for the NATO-led intervention in Libya. They carried anti-government banners and placards that read "The imperialists out of Libya" and "US-EU-NATO kill people", shouted anti-intervention slogans and torched the flag of Europe.

On March 20 a similar protest was held on Crete, in which Communists marched to the Souda Bay naval base which provided command and logistical support to the NATO-led intervention. The protesters demanded closure of the NATO base.

=== India ===
On March 27 hundreds of Muslim demonstrators, led by the Aba-Saleh Society, held a protest march in Lucknow. The rally began at Dargah Hazrat Abbas and ended at Roza-e-Kazmain. Speaker Maulana Ameer Haider addressed the crowd, denouncing the United States-led military action in Libya and Saudi Arabia's involvement in Bahrain. The protesters chanted slogans against the US-led military forces and branded them "killer of innocents".

=== Italy ===
On March 26, Libyans living in Rome held a demonstration at the Republic Plaza in central Rome to protest the military intervention. The demonstrators held placards, displayed the flag of the Great Socialist People's Libyan Arab Jamahiriya, shouted slogans and displayed pictures of Muammar Gaddafi.

=== Mali ===
On March 25, thousands of Malians demonstrated in Bamako (the capital of Mali) to protest against the NATO-led military operation in Libya. The crowd marched first to the French embassy and then to the embassy of the United States. Protesters shouted "Down with Sarkozy! Down with Obama!" The demonstration, organized by Islamic groups in the nation, brought traffic to a halt in the Bamako city center.

=== Nicaragua ===
From March 19 to March 24, three demonstrations were organized in Nicaragua to protest the military intervention. In the March 24 protest (the third since the beginning of the military operation in Libya) hundreds of supporters of president Daniel Ortega marched in Nicaragua's capital, Managua. The rally, organized by Ortega's followers and called the "Nicaraguan Solidarity Committee with Libya", started from the embassy of Libya and ended outside the headquarters of the United Nations Development Program. Leaders of the demonstration called the military intervention "imperialist military aggression backed by the UN". Protesters shouted "No war", "Yes to peace", displayed banners with pictures of Gaddafi, chanted slogans in support of Gadhafi and attacked the United States.

=== Philippines ===
On March 20 an anti-war protest against NATO intervention in Libya was held in Manila, the capital of the Philippines, in which protesters burned a replica of the flag of the United States. On March 21, the Union of Catholic Asian News (UCAN) reported that peace organizations in the Philippines had joined Islamic protesters to condemn the UN-backed air strikes in Libya. Jolly Lais, spokesperson for the Muslim group Bangsamoro National Solidarity Movement (BANGSA), said "This brazen military aggression betrays the double standard by which the United Nations uses". The left-wing political party Bayan Muna called the airstrikes "a brutal act of armed intervention against a sovereign nation".

On March 25, Philippine Muslims protested the military action after Friday prayers at a mosque in Manila. The anti-war protesters displayed pro-Libya placards reading, "Appeal to U.S. Save Humanity Stop Bombing to Libya".

=== Russia ===
Interfax reported that Molodaya Gvardiya (Young Guard of United Russia), a pro-Kremlin youth group and the youth wing of United Russia, planned to picket embassies of the United States, Canada, Belgium, the United Kingdom, Italy, and France on March 23. Activists of Molodaya Gvardiya took part in a flower-laying ceremony in front of the Libyan embassy in Moscow to commemorate the victims of the NATO attack in Libya.

=== Serbia ===
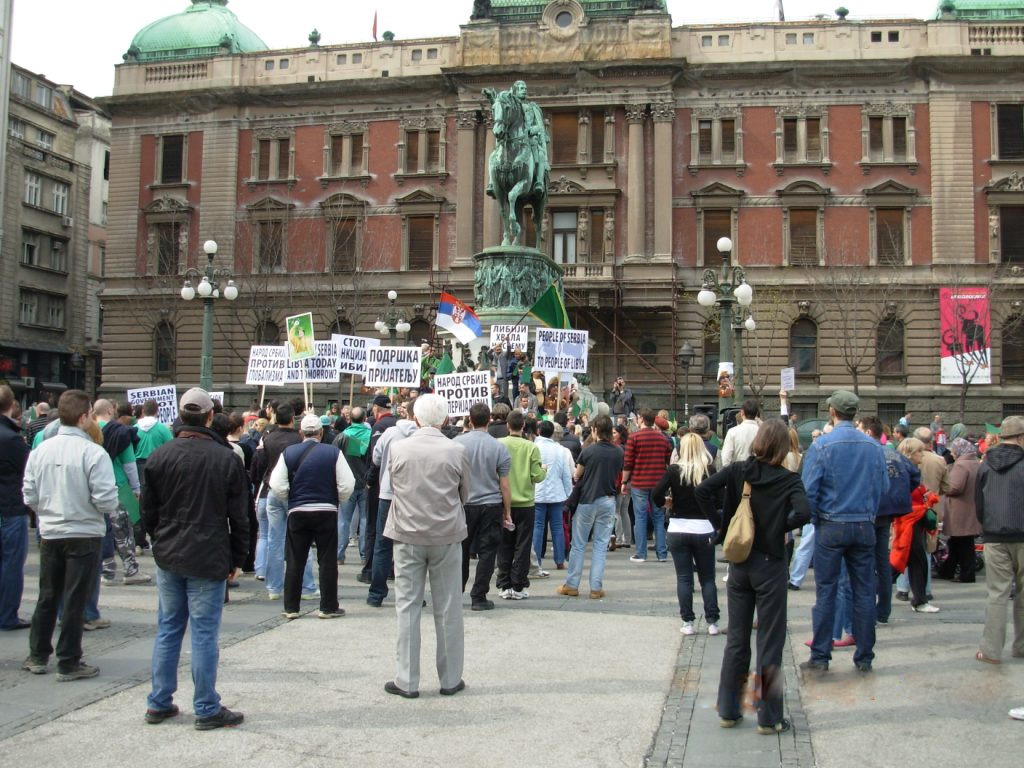
Protest in Belgrade on March 26, 2011, against military intervention in Libya

On March 20 an anti-intervention protest was held in Belgrade, the capital of Serbia, in which protesters carried pictures of Muammar Gaddafi and Josip Broz Tito. On March 26, a second anti-intervention protests was held in the center of Belgrade at the Republic Square by Libyan students studying in Serbia and a Libyan-Serbian friendship organization. Protesters carried the flag of Libya and pictures of Gaddafi.

On March 27, a third anti-intervention protest was held in Belgrade. About 200 people, including Libyan students and expatriates, demonstrated at the Manjež park. The protesters chanted slogans ("Support from Serbia", "A true friend of Serbia and Libya", "Libya and Serbia", "NATO killers"), displayed photos of Gaddafi and carried placards opposing NATO.

=== Spain ===
On March 20, 400 people protested in Barcelona against the NATO intervention affirming "support to the Libyan people, nor NATO or Gaddafi" and "no more blood for oil". One of the organizers of the protest, Pere Ortega, believed the military intervention will make Gaddafi's posture stronger. The protesters carried banners reading, "Nor tyrannies or occupations. Solidarity with the people in struggle".

On March 24, several dozens of people protested in Murcia under the banner "Yesterday Iraq, today Libya. No to humanitarian imperialism", exhorting an end to the allied intervention and Gaddafi's repression. The protesters shouted, "No more blood for oil" and "Stop the war". There was another anti-war demonstration in Gijón, convoked by the "Solidarity Committee with the Arab Cause".

On March 26 thousands of people rallied in Madrid, the capital of Spain. The march was organized by human rights groups and other social organizations under the banner, "For the emancipation of the Arab nations: neither dictators nor imperialists". On the same day, an anti-war demonstration calling on governments to stop the air attack on Libya was held in front of the Rota Naval Base.

=== Sri Lanka ===
Trade unions in Sri Lanka across the political spectrum voiced their opposition to the military intervention in Libya. On March 21, Sri Lankan trade union leader and the governor of the Western Province Alavi Mowlana said at a media briefing in Colombo that Sri Lankan trade unions will organize protests in the country's largest city demanding that the United States and Western nations stop the military intervention. He said anti-imperialist organizations in Sri Lanka will organize an initial protest campaign against the United States–led military intervention at the Colombo Grand Mosque on March 25.

On March 24, protests against the NATO-led air attacks were organized by political parties allied to Sri Lanka's president Mahinda Rajapaksa. Approximately 500 supporters of the National Freedom Front (NFF) participated in the demonstrations. Protesters chanted anti-Western slogans, slogans against Secretary-General of the United Nations Ban Ki-moon, waved placards and burned used tyres outside the United Nations (UN) office in Colombo. According to BBC correspondent in Sri Lanka Elmo Fernando, the demonstrators shouted slogans urging Ban Ki-moon to quit his post and "go home" and described the military intervention in Libya as war crimes. National Freedom Front (NFF) leader and MP Wimal Weerawansa (whose party organized the protest) said, "We are against the biased behaviour of the UN on Libya in favour of the US and Britain. The people of Libya should decide how to resolve their own internal problems". Banners reading, "We condemn killing innocent civilians in Libya" and "Banki Moon go to hell" were seen in the demonstration. Protesters burned and beat US President Barack Obama in effigy. Some protesters described Barack Obama as a "murderer".

On March 25, hundreds of Sri Lankan Muslims protested in Colombo. The demonstrators marched from the Jummah Mosque in Kollupitiya to the embassy of the United States on Galle Road in Colombo. Protesters held placards supporting Muammar Gaddafi and burned effigies of Barack Obama.

=== Turkey ===
Approximately 100 people—mostly members of the Labor Party (EMEP)—demonstrated on March 20 outside the French Consulate General in Istanbul against France, the US and other western countries. They shouted slogans such as "Get out of Libya" and "Libyan people are not alone". On March 21 members of a left-wing Turkish political party protested outside the French embassy in Turkey's capital, Ankara. The demonstrators held a banner reading, "Murderer France, get out of Libya!".

=== United Kingdom ===
On March 20 anti-war protesters demonstrated in London's Downing Street, waving placards stating "The lessons of Iraq and Afghanistan have not been learnt". Groups organizing the protest included the Campaign for Nuclear Disarmament (CND) and the Stop the War Coalition(StWC). Labour Member of Parliament Jeremy Corbyn and vice-president of the StWC George Galloway took part in the protest. According to Corbyn, "This war is about oil, control and a message to the rest of the world and region that we can do it if we want to". Kate Hudson, chair of the CND, called the military intervention "utterly reprehensible" and Galloway described the intervention as "imperialist war-making". Anti-Gaddafi protesters, in turn, opposed those opposing the intervention. On March 21, approximately 150 people demonstrated in London in support of Gaddafi and protesting against the UK's intervention in Libya.

=== United States ===
==== March 19 ====
On March 19 a demonstration in Times Square, New York City originally meant to protest the Iraq War turned into a protest against the military intervention in Libya. U.S. Representative Charles B. Rangel joined the protesters, expressing anger at the fact that Congress was not consulted before the military strikes. Nearly 80 people attended the demonstration.

Eric Ruder and Sam Bernstein of SocialistWorker.org, published by the International Socialist Organization (ISO), reported that anti-war protesters in Seattle who gathered to protest the Iraq War on March 19 displayed signs reading, "U.S./UN/NATO—Hands off Libya!". On March 19 the anti-war group Act Now to Stop War and End Racism (A.N.S.W.E.R.) organized a protest in Boston, claiming the United States and the United Nations attacked Libya for oil.

Hundreds of people demonstrated on Chicago's Michigan Avenue on March 19. Protesters distributed anti-war leaflets, shouting "We need money for jobs, not the war. We need money for schools, not the war. We need money for health care, not the war". Several speakers at the protest (originally held to mark the eighth anniversary of the Iraq War) condemned military action against Libya. Protesters chanted "No UN, no Qaddafi, let the people rule Benghazi!".

Workers World, published by the Marxist–Leninist Workers World Party (WWP), reported about 1,500 protesters rallied at Lafayette Park in Washington, D.C., on March 19 and demanded an end to the military operation in Libya and the wars in Iraq and Afghanistan. Protests in San Francisco marked the first day of the US-led air strike in Libya and the eighth anniversary of the Iraq War. According to Workers World hundreds of protesters marched in Saint Paul, Minnesota, shouting "Do not expand wars against Libya!".

An A.N.S.W.E.R conference revealed systematic false reporting in NATO media of rebel activity and the NATO bombing of Libya from investigative groups in Libya.

==== March 20 ====
Workers World reported that thousands of anti-war protesters, led by A.N.S.W.E.R., demonstrated in Los Angeles on March 20. According to Workers World, "Libya was clearly on the minds of everyone there and news of the criminal attack electrified the demonstration".

==== March 21 ====
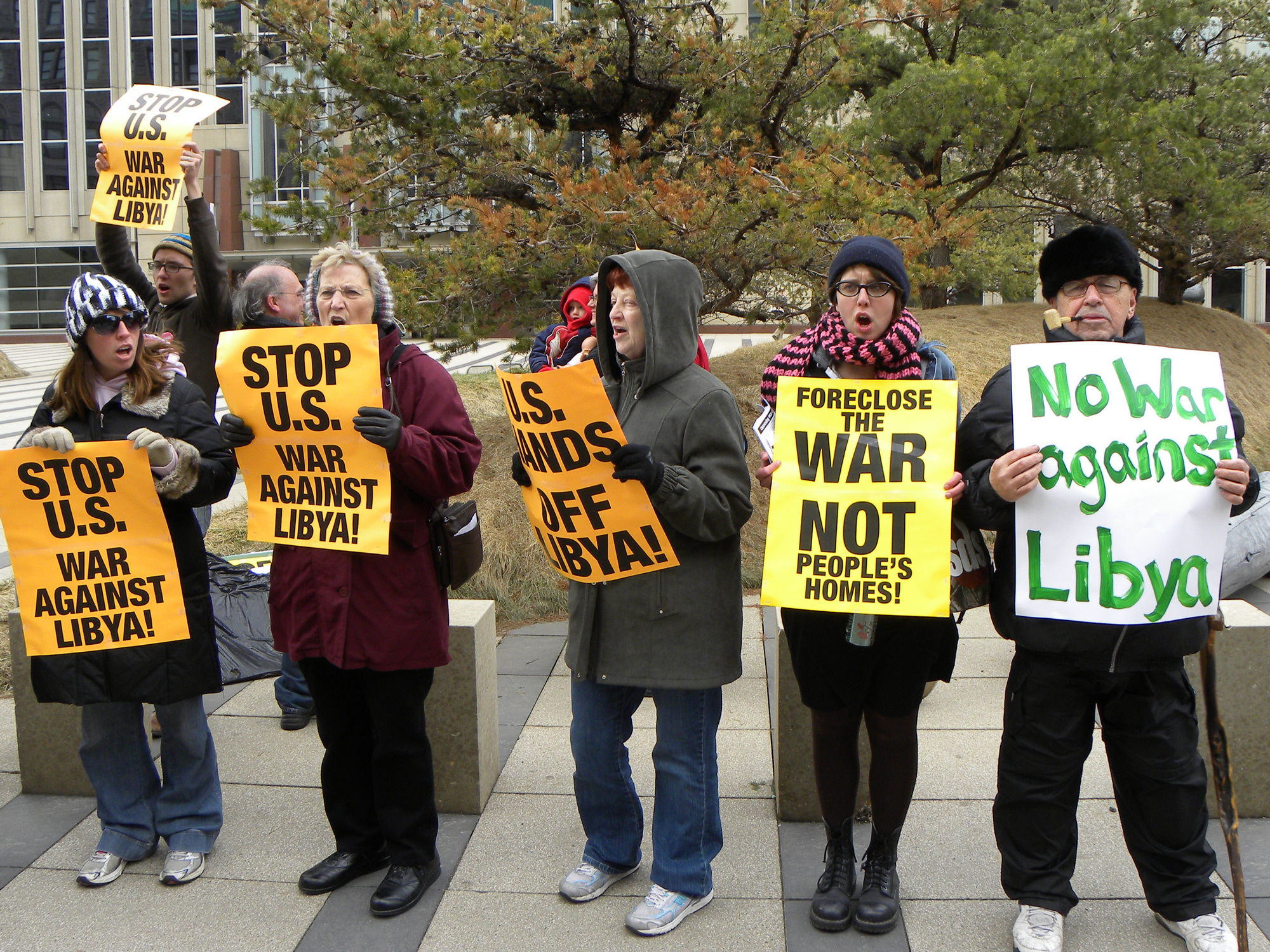
Demonstrators in Minneapolis hold placards on March 21, 2011, to protest Operation Odyssey Dawn.

On March 21, an anti-war protest was held in Minneapolis. Nearly 75 members of a local anti-war group, the Anti-War Committee (AWC), demonstrated outside the Federal Building in downtown Minneapolis. A protest organized by Dustin Krutsinger was held by students at the University of Iowa in Iowa City. A sign reading, "Obama No 'Change' From Bush" was seen in the demonstration. In Memphis, Tennessee, an anti-war protest was held in which a sign reading "Instead of War Invest in People" was seen.

Workers World reported that the International Action Center (IAC) organized a demonstration at the Westwood, Los Angeles Federal Building on March 20 to demand an end to the US, French and British attacks on Libya. According to Workers World, members of BAYAN-USA, the All African Peoples Revolutionary Party-GC, Unión del Barrio and Anti-Racist Action (ARA) also participated in the demonstration.

In Philadelphia, a protest was held by Philadelphia Against War on March 21. Demonstrators gathered outside Philadelphia City Hall and denounced the US-NATO military intervention in Libya. Protesters held signs reading, "Not another U.S. war for oil" and "Stop U.S. attacks on Arab and African people". Workers World reported that the protest was endorsed by the Brandywine Peace Community and the International Action Center (IAC). According to Workers World, the International Action Center (IAC) organized a picket line on March 21 in Times Square in New York City to protest the coalition air attack in Libya.

==== March 23 ====
According to the Liberation, a newspaper published by the Marxist–Leninist Party for Socialism and Liberation (PSL), protests were held in Austin, Texas, and outside the New Federal Building in San Francisco. In the San Francisco protest, speakers included Henry Clark of the West County Toxics Coalition (who claimed the US attacked Libya for its oil reserves), an Iraq War veteran, a representative of Code Pink, Richard Becker of A.N.S.W.E.R. and Saul Kanowitz of the PSL. Protesters chanted "Humanitarian aid, it's a lie, bombs fall and people die!"

==== March 26 ====
On March 26, an anti-war demonstration organized by A.N.S.W.E.R. was held outside the White House in Washington, D.C. Protesters carried placards reading "$ for Jobs and Schools, not War on Libya" and "Stop U.S. French and British War on Libya". Brian Becker (national director of A.N.S.W.E.R.) said that the "United States has no right to bomb Libya. It has no right to pretend it's a champion of freedom and democracy. Only Libya can determine its destiny". According to the PSL's newspaper Liberation, the demonstration was attended by activists from cities across the country and progressive organizations such as the FMLN-DC (Farabundo Marti National Liberation Front). Protesters at the demonstration chanted, "War in Libya—We say NO! U.S. intervention has got to go!"

== April 2011 ==
=== Australia ===
A demonstration was held outside the US consulate in Sydney to protest against the Australian government's involvement in the military operation in Libya. The protesters slammed United Nations Security Council Resolution 1973, saying that true democracy cannot be implemented from the outside and calling for an end to the attack on Libya. Journalist and film maker John Pilger addressed the crowd.

=== Ghana ===
On April 5 a group called Friends Against Western Forces in Libya held a demonstration in Accra, the capital of Ghana, to protest Western interference in Libya. Protesters described the western military action in Libya as an attempt to colonize the country and an attack on Islam. The demonstrators (who rallied through some of the main streets of Accra) began the march from Kawukudi through the Kanda overpass to the French Embassy. The protesters carried placards and shouted, "death to the West". Alhaji Rahman, a leading figure of the group, presented a petition to the French Embassy calling for an immediate halt to the West's bombing in Libya.

=== India ===
On April 3, hundreds of Muslims participated (at the call of Imam-e-Juma and Shia cleric Maulana Kalbe Jawwad) in a protest rally in Lucknow against NATO interference in Libya and Saudi Arabia's involvement in Bahrain. Imam of Tile Wali Masjid Maulana Fazlur Rehman Waizi condemned the US action in Libya, and called for an immediate withdrawal of NATO forces.

Libyan students and others held a protest April 4 in Allahabad. Protesters claimed that NATO forces were killing civilians in Libya, and foreign nations had targeted the country for its oil.

=== Italy ===
On April 2 associations, political parties and hundreds of pacifists demonstrated at Piazza Navona in Rome to protest against the NATO intervention. The protesters quoted from Nelson Mandela, Bertolt Brecht and Albert Einstein, displayed a banner reading "humanitarian wars do not exist", and waved rainbow-colored anti-war flags. Organizers of the protest rally included Emergency, an NGO founded by Gino Strada. The demonstration was attended by musicians such as Andrea Rivers, Assalti Frontali and Frankie Hi-Nrg mc.

=== Serbia ===
On April 9, the Serbian Radical Party organized a meeting in Belgrade protesting the NATO intervention in Libya. At the meeting, a letter was read from party leader Vojislav Šešelj.

=== Spain ===
On April 3, about 1,500 people from 30 social organizations and political parties demonstrated in the streets of Seville against the war in Libya. The protesters read a manifesto entitled "No to war. Not in our name. Solidarity with the peoples" which saluted "the mobilization of the Arab and North-African peoples for social rights and democratic liberties", condemned "the violent repression from the governments to peaceful demonstrations" and criticized corporate media for "the absolutely intentional use of information relating to Libya's conflict, getting things out of context and shamelessly manipulating the facts, with the aim to imposing in the West a distorted vision of that country, leaving the ideological grounds well prepared to justify the intervention". They also condemned the participation of Spain in the war and criticized the double standard of the countries who attacked Libya (ostensibly to defend Libyans' human rights of the Libyans) when "they had never support the defense of human rights of peoples subject to genocide recognized by the UN, as the clear examples of the Sahrawi and Palestinian peoples".

On April 9, more than 200 people protested in Madrid against the war in Libya under the banner, "No to imperialist war. For the sovereignty of the peoples. No to NATO, bases out", demanding the government withdraw of Spanish troops from Operation Odyssey Dawn, shouting "Imperialism is terrorism", "Zapatero killer" and "NATO no, Libya yes". Another demonstration was held in Palma de Mallorca, organized by local social movements.

=== United States ===
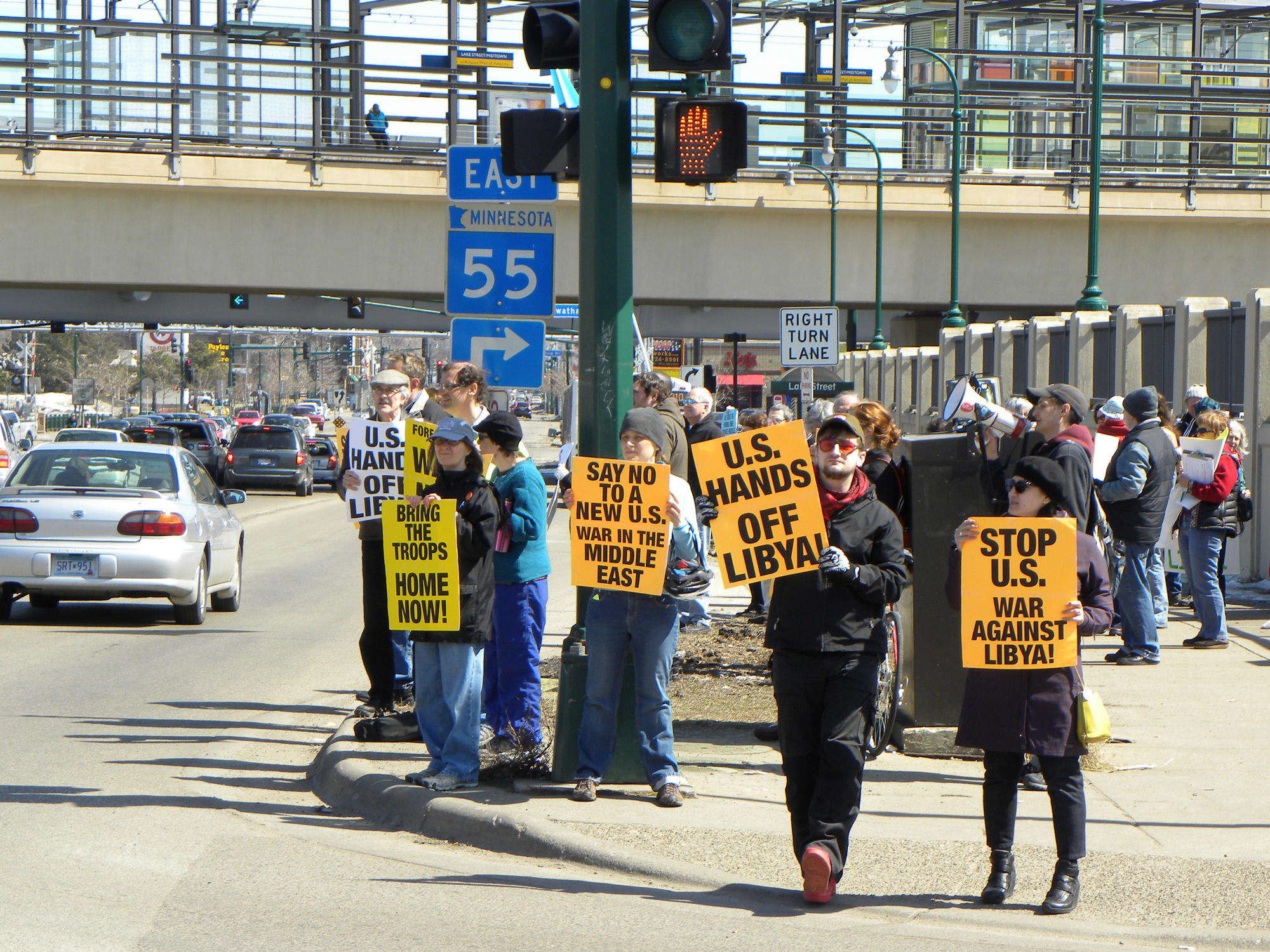
Protest in Minnesota April 2, 2011, against US military intervention in Libya

On April 2 a protest was organized in Minneapolis by the Anti-War Committee (AWC), Emergency Committee to Stop U.S. War in Libya, Military Families Speak Out (MFSO), Students for a Democratic Society (U of MN), the Twin Cities Peace Campaign, Veterans for Peace, Women Against Military Madness and other organizations which was attended by more than 50 protesters. The demonstrators shouted anti-war slogans and displayed signs reading "U.S. hands off Libya," "Foreclose the war, not people's homes," and "Say no to U.S. war against Libya". A statement issued by organizers said, "Eight years after the start of the war in Iraq, the U.S. has launched a new war in the Middle East, this time against Libya. This is not a 'humanitarian intervention.' This is a war launched to try to control the oil resources of the region". Meredith Aby of the Anti-War Committee (AWC) told the crowd, "Obama doesn't have the right to decide for the Libyan people who their leader is or what they do with their oil. Those questions are for the Libyan people to answer and them alone."

== July 2011 ==
=== Libya ===
For three days before July 18, 2011, a number of rallies were held in different parts of the country, each drawing crowds of up to 10,000 in support of Gaddafi.

== August 2011 ==
=== Libya ===
On August 15, 2011, a rally was held in Tripoli to show support for Gaddafi.

== See also ==
- Protests against the Iraq War
- Protests against the Vietnam War
- Protests against the War in Afghanistan (2001–present)
- List of peace activists
- List of anti-war organizations
