= Tant =

Tant is a surname. Notable people with the surname include:

- Allison Tant (born 1961), American politician
- Ed Tant (fl. 1974–), American journalist and political activist
- Jay Tant (born 1977), American football player
- Paul Tant (1945–2014), Belgian politician
