= Protests against the Iraq War =

2002–2011 series of demonstrations

- Part of the opposition to the Iraq War and the Antiglobalization movement
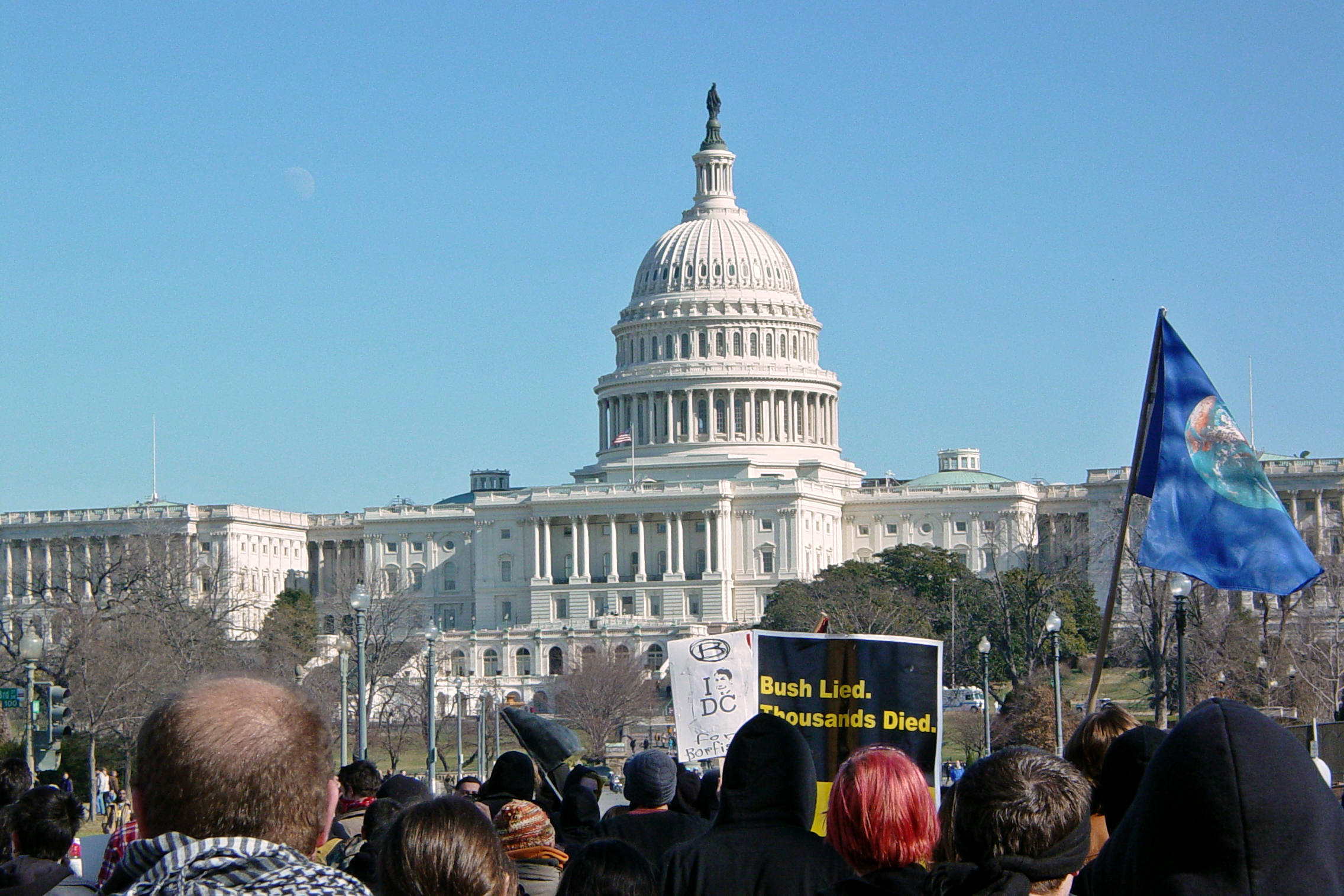
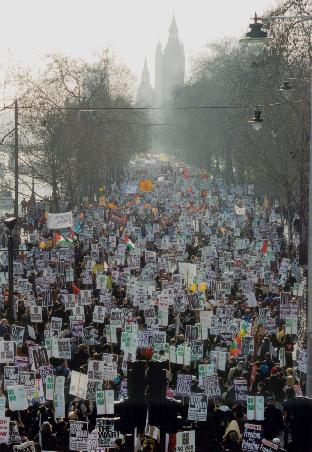
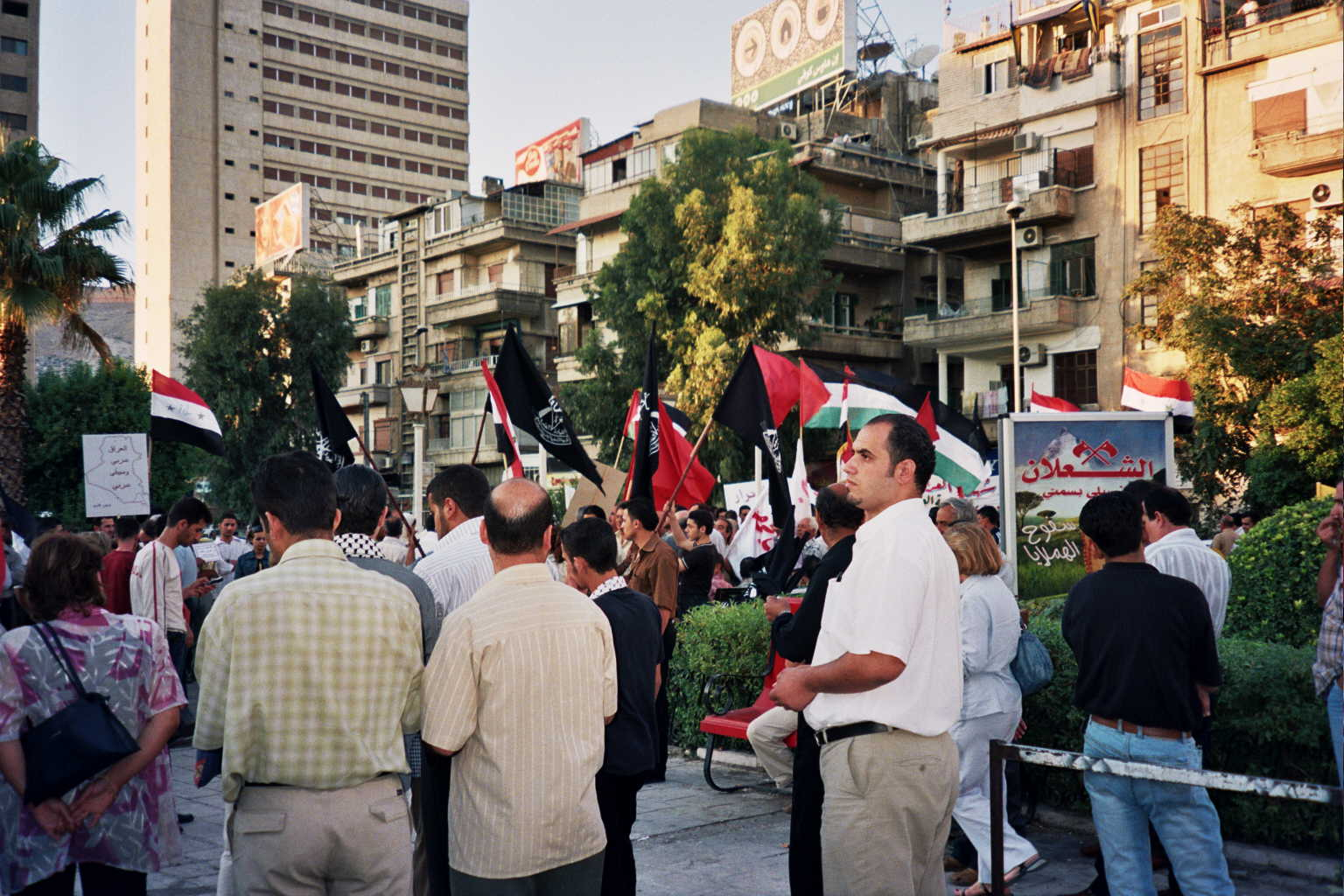
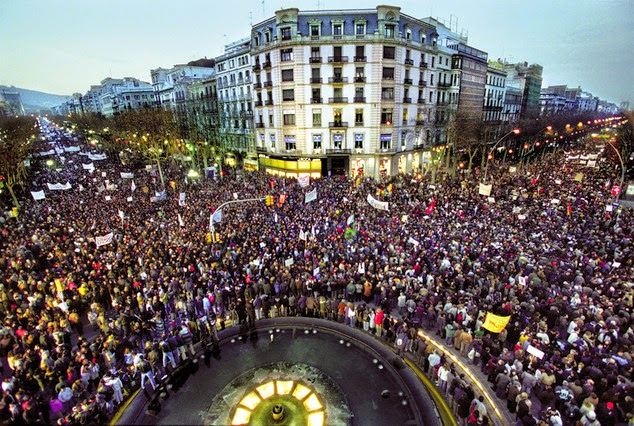
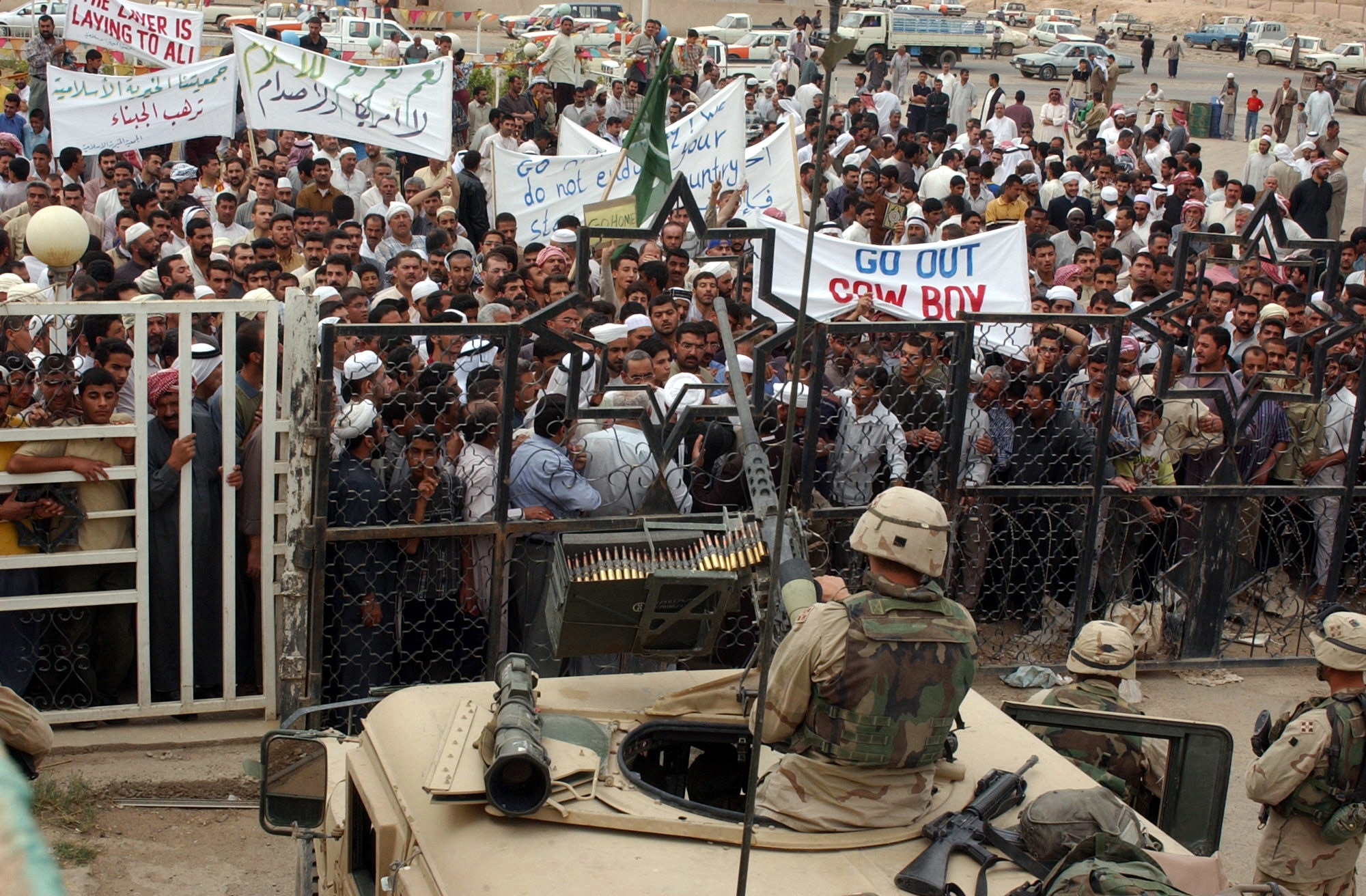
- (top-to-bottom, left-to-right): protests in Washington, D.C. in January 2007; protests in London, United Kingdom on February 15, 2003; protests in Damascus, Syria in September 2005; protests in Barcelona, Spain in February 2003; anti-occupation protests in Samarra, Iraq in April 2003.
- Date: September 12, 2002 – May 26, 2011 (main phase)
- Location: Global
- Caused by: Criticism of the Iraq War
- Goals: Demonstrations against the US and allied involvement of the Iraq War. Withdrawal of U.S. troops from Iraq (in effect on December 2007–11)
- Methods: Street protests, sit-ins, die-ins, civil disobedience, occupations, mass strike, more+
- Status: Ended

Number
36 million protesters (January – April 2003)	

Casualties
- Deaths: Unknown
- Injuries: Unknown
- Arrested: 100–1,700+ protesters
- The protest began on September 12, 2002, and raged on throughout the Iraq War from March 2003, until December 2011.

Beginning in late 2002 and continuing after the 2003 invasion of Iraq, large-scale protests against the Iraq War were held in many cities worldwide, often coordinated to occur simultaneously around the world. After the biggest series of demonstrations, on February 15, 2003, New York Times writer Patrick Tyler claimed that they showed that there were two superpowers on the planet: the United States and worldwide public opinion.

These demonstrations against the war were mainly organized by anti-war organizations, many of whom had been formed in opposition to the invasion of Afghanistan. In some Arab countries demonstrations were organized by the state. Europe saw the biggest mobilization of protesters, including a rally of three million people in Rome, which is listed in the Guinness Book of Records as the largest ever anti-war rally.

According to the French academic Dominique Reynié, between January 3 and April 12, 2003, 36 million people across the globe took part in almost 3,000 protests against the Iraq war.

In the United States, even though pro-war demonstrators have been quoted as referring to anti-war protests as a "vocal minority", Gallup Polls updated September 14, 2007, state, "Since the summer of 2005, opponents of the war have tended to outnumber supporters. A majority of Americans believe the war was a mistake."

From the protests before and during the Iraq War, this was one of the biggest global peace protests to occur in the early 21st century, since the 20th century protest of the Vietnam War. Throughout several rallies spanning throughout 2002 until 2011, an unspecified number of people were arrested. Even though the United States had already withdrawn the troops from Iraq by December 2011, another anti-war protest led by veterans of the Iraq War took place in May 2012 at Chicago during the NATO Summit at the Hyatt Regency, regarding the War in Afghanistan.

== Scope and impact in the United States ==
A March 2003 Gallup poll conducted during the first few days of the war showed that 5% of the population had protested or made a public opposition against the war compared to 21% who attended a rally or made a public display to support the war. An ABC news poll showed that 2% had attended an anti-war protest and 1% attended a pro-war rally. The protests made 20% more opposed to the war and 7% more supportive. A Fox News poll showed that while 63% had an unfavorable view of the protesters, just 23% had a favorable view. According to Pew Research, 40% said in March 2003 that they had heard "too much" from people opposed to the war against 17% who said "too little".

Some observers have noted that the protests against the Iraq War were relatively small-scale and infrequent compared to protests against the Vietnam War. One of the most often cited factors for this is the lack of conscription.

== Prior to the Iraq War ==
These protests are said to be the biggest global peace protests before a war actually started; the peace movement is compared with the movement caused by the Vietnam War.

=== September 2002 ===
On September 12, 2002, U.S. President George W. Bush spoke to the United Nations General Assembly. Outside the United Nations building, over 1,000 people attended a protest organized by Voter March and No Blood for Oil.

On September 24, Tony Blair released a document describing Britain's case for war in Iraq. Three days later, an anti-war rally in London drew a crowd of at least 150,000.

On September 29, roughly 5,000 anti-war protesters converged on Washington, D.C., on the day after an anti-International Monetary Fund protest.

=== October 2002 ===
On October 2, the day President Bush signed into law Congress' joint resolution authorizing the war, a small-scale protest was held in Chicago, attended by a crowd of roughly 1,000 who listened to speeches by Jesse Jackson and then-Illinois State Senator Barack Obama. Obama's statement, "I am not opposed to all wars. I'm opposed to dumb wars," was barely noted at the time, but became famous during the 2008 Democratic presidential primaries when the Obama camp used it to demonstrate his courage and good judgment on the war.

On October 7, Bush delivered a major speech justifying the invasion of Iraq at the Cincinnati Museum Center at Union Terminal. Outside, approximately 3,000 people gathered to protest the coming war. Later, a few hundred protesters blocking the Museum Center exits were dispersed by mounted police, and six people were arrested.

On October 26, protests took place in various cities across the world. Over 100,000 people took part in a protest in Washington. 50,000 people took part in a demonstration in San Francisco. Both protests were called by the ANSWER Coalition.

On October 31, around 150 protests took place across the United Kingdom, including Critical Mass bike rides, occupations, and mass demonstrations in Brighton, Manchester, Glasgow and London. Protests also took place in the US.

=== November 2002 ===
On November 9, demonstrations were held against the war at the end of the first European Social Forum in Florence, Italy. According to the organizers, 1,000,000 people were in attendance. Local authorities put attendance at 500,000.

On Saturday, November 16, in Canada, an anti-war demonstration of about 2,000 people occurred at Queen's Park in Toronto.

On November 17, a large anti-war coalition held a peace march in Vancouver, marching from Peace Flame Park as part of a Cross-Canada Day of Action. In Vancouver, about 3,000 people gathered in the rain. Washington must take any complaints against foreign governments to the United Nations, they said. Many accused the White House of targeting Saddam Hussein in order to try to take control of valuable oil reserves. About 1,000 marched through a shower of ice pellets in Montreal, and about 500 showed up in a blur of white snow on Parliament Hill. Rallies were held in several other cities, including Halifax, Winnipeg and Edmonton.

=== January 2003 ===
On January 16, 2003, protests were held worldwide in opposition to a war with Iraq, including in Turkey, Egypt, Pakistan, Japan, Belgium, the Netherlands, Argentina, and the United States, where Americans attended a rally in Washington, D.C. The U.S. Park Police, which oversees activities on the National Mall, stopped providing estimates of crowd size after being threatened with lawsuits by the organizers of the Million Man March, but said that protest organizers only had a permit for 30,000 demonstrators.

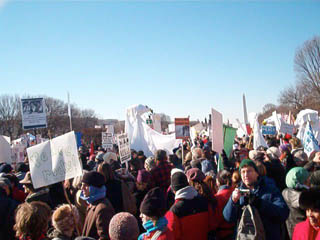
January 18 peace protest in Washington, D.C.

On January 18, anti-war demonstrations, focusing particularly but not exclusively on the expected war with Iraq, took place in villages, towns, and cities around the world, including Tokyo, Moscow, Paris, London, Dublin, Montreal, Ottawa, Toronto, Cologne, Bonn, Gothenburg, Florence, Oslo, Rotterdam, Istanbul and Cairo. In New Zealand, thousands rallied in Dunedin and Christchurch, while in Auckland protesters rallied at the Devonport naval base on January 28, opposing the deployment of the frigate HMNZS Te Mana to the Gulf.

NION and ANSWER jointly organized protests in Washington, D.C., and San Francisco. Other protests took place all over the United States, including various smaller places such as Lincoln, Nebraska.

Upwards of 50,000 people demonstrated in San Francisco. The day started with a waterfront rally at 11 am, followed by a march down Market Street to the civic center.

In Seattle, a surprise turnout on a sunny Saturday saw over 45,000 people (Organizer and observers reports) march from the Seattle Center (after several speeches) to King Street Station-the local media all came up with nonsensical crowd numbers, from 200 up to 1,500 people. People were still vacating the starting point at the Seattle Center while the front of the march was piling up at King Street Station, the terminal point of the march; Over 5 miles of solid people-as was evidenced by one aerial photo courtesy KING-TV, showed the true scope of the march. Most of the media downplayed the numbers by taking photos at the front of the parade, on flat ground-which usually showed just a few hundred people. For some reason there was no speaker awaiting to what would have been a crowd of possibly 50,000 people-it simply ended...casual shoppers and walkers joining the crowd-the largest march of any kind in Seattle's history at the time (surpassed by the Women's March in Seattle in 2017).

In Washington, "at least tens of thousands", people demonstrated through the city, ending with a rally at The Mall. Among the speakers was Rev. Jesse Jackson who told the crowd that "We are here because we choose coexistence over coannihilation."

The protests were planned to coincide with January 15, the birthday of Martin Luther King Jr.

=== February 2003 ===
On February 15, millions of people protested, in approximately 800 cities around the world. Listed by the 2004 Guinness Book of Records as the largest protest in human history, protests occurred among others in the United Kingdom, Italy, Spain, Germany, Switzerland, the Republic of Ireland, the United States, Canada, Australia, South Africa, Syria, India, Russia, South Korea, Japan, and even McMurdo Station in Antarctica. Perhaps the largest demonstration this day occurred in London, with up to one million protestors gathering in Hyde Park; speakers included the Reverend Jesse Jackson, London mayor Ken Livingstone, and Liberal Democrat leader Charles Kennedy. A large demonstration, also attended by perhaps around a million, took place in Madrid.

=== March 2003 ===
Such prominent figures of demonstrations against Vietnam War in the 1960s and 70s as Pete Seeger, Tom Hayden, Joan Baez, Norman Siegel, William Sloane Coffin took part in the protests against the invasion in Iraq in the USA.

On March 8, three separate marches converged on Manchester Town Hall, UK. Official estimates put the number of participants at 10,000 (although this was disputed by organisers), making it the biggest political demonstration in the city since the Peterloo Massacre in 1819.

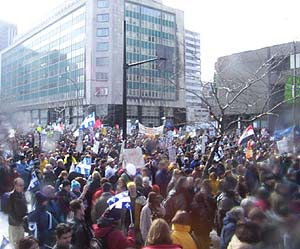
Protesters in front of Complexe Guy-Favreau in Montreal

On March 15, Spanish and Italian cities showed some of the largest turnouts against their governments' pro-war stance, with more than 400,000 protesters in Milan, more than 300,000 in Barcelona forming a mile-long human chain, and more than 120,000 in Madrid. Marches also took place in Seville, Aranjuez, Palencia, and in the Canary Islands.

Many of the protests were said to be smaller than those in the same cities a month ago; exceptions were Montreal, which upped its turnout to 200,000 and Dublin where 130,000 demonstrated. The Montreal turnout may have been related to solidarity against American anti-French sentiment, which was a common theme for many of the protesters. A further 15,000 protested in Quebec City. 55,000 protested in Paris, and 4,500 to 10,000 in Marseille. 100,000 protested in Berlin, some 20,000 protested in Athens, close to 10,000 people marched in Tokyo, and tens of thousands in Washington, D.C. Organizers claimed between 30,000 and 45,000 people turned out, while The Oregonian and the Associated Press estimated between 20,000 and 25,000 people attended, closer to the number in Portland who participated in the January 18 protest. Thousands more marched in cities worldwide including Bangkok, Seoul, Hong Kong, Amman, Chicago, Calcutta, Melbourne, Christchurch, Dunedin, Paris, London, Portsmouth, Leeds, York, Exeter, Newcastle upon Tyne, Frankfurt, Nuremberg, Zurich, Copenhagen, Stockholm, Nicosia, Monaco, Santiago, Havana, São Paulo, Buenos Aires, Moscow, Seattle, Chicago, San Francisco, Los Angeles, Atlanta, Vancouver, Halifax, Ottawa, and Toronto, as well as cities in Yemen, Turkey, Israel, and the Palestinian territories.

On March 16, more than 6,000 candlelight vigils for peace were held in more than a hundred countries.

On 18 March 2003, two activists climbed the sails of the iconic Sydney Opera House to paint the words No War in bright red paint.

On March 19, across the United Kingdom tens of thousands of school students staged walkouts.

In Birmingham, 4,000 (BBC estimate) striking school students held a demonstration which ended at Victoria Square. Though there were some reports of some students throwing coins, West Midlands police said that the protests were "buoyant rather than boisterous" and no arrests were made. The demonstration later moved on to Cannon Hill Park. The son of Lord Hunt, a junior health Minister who quit his job over the march, was amongst the students in attendance.

In West Yorkshire around 500 students (BBC estimate) walked out of Ilkley Grammar School, reportedly one-third of the student body. In Bradford up to 200 students (BBC estimate) gathered in Centenary Square.

Demonstrations also took place in the city centre in Leeds and Horsforth.

A large protest took place at Westminster where London school students gathered.

In Manchester, 300 (eye-witness Stop the War estimate) secondary school children, Further Education students and university students met at Albert Square at 12 noon. They marched to the BBC studios where they sat down in the road at around 1pm and blocked the traffic for over an hour where their numbers grew to around 1000 demonstrators. They were filmed by anti-war activists and video clips were distributed. The students then marched around the city centre and ended up back at Albert Square at about 4pm where they remained demonstrating in front of the Town Hall for some hours. The whole of this event was filmed by anti-war activists accumulating two hours of footage.

== Invasion of Iraq ==
=== March 20, 2003 ===
The day after the invasion of Iraq had begun, protests were held in cities around the world. In some U.S. cities, protesters attempted to shut their respective cities down. In Germany, students staged a massive walkout. In London, a massive demonstration was held in front of the Houses of Parliament.

=== March 21, 2003 ===
Demonstrations were organized for a second day in a row in various US cities including Seattle, Portland, Oregon, Chicago, Atlanta, Georgia, San Francisco, and Los Angeles. In the last two cities, demonstrators closed parts of the city to traffic.

=== March 22–23, 2003 ===
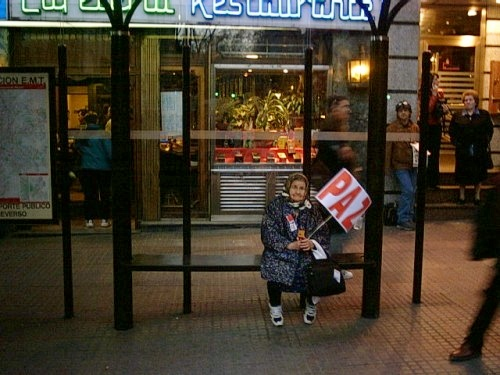
An elderly woman rests in Madrid in a demonstration on March 23. The poster says "PEACE" in Spanish.

Media report about 150,000 protesters in Barcelona (other sources say 1,000,000); more than 100,000 (other sources: up to 500,000) protesters in London; some 100,000 protesters in Paris; at least 150,000 protesters altogether in many German cities; between 35,000 and 90,000 in Lisbon; around 40,000 in Bern, the largest protest in Switzerland for decades; 10,000 to 20,000 in Greece, Denmark and Finland. 250,000 protesters demonstrated in New York City according to the German Spiegel Online magazine. There were protests in Washington, D.C. In Chicago, protesters disrupted traffic by closing down Lake Shore Drive. CNN reported that a march of over a thousand protesters in Atlanta, Georgia passed by their headquarters, upset over that network's coverage of the war.

Canada likewise experienced numerous anti-war protests over the weekend. Crowds of anti-war demonstrators took to the streets of Montreal and Toronto. Calgary held three days of protests (20 March – 22nd), culminating in a march which surrounded the government building and American consulate.

In the Italian city of Naples 10,000 anti-war protesters marched towards a NATO base in Bagnoli.

Protests also took place in Wellington, New Zealand.; the Australian cities of Brisbane and Hobart (which were brought to a halt); Jakarta, Indonesia, where protesters converged on the US embassy; across South Korea including the capital Seoul, where Buddhist monks played drums to console the spirits of war casualties to the 2,000 protesters; across India including 15,000 in Calcutta; Bangladesh which saw a general strike (closing down many businesses and mosques); and Japan, including protests near US naval and air bases on the southern island of Okinawa.

Thousands of protesters, mainly Muslims, demonstrated across the African continent. Hundreds (BBC estimate) of young people marched in Mombasa in Kenya. The Somali capital Mogadishu saw protests by students, Koranic schoolchildren, women and intellectuals. There were reports about massive conflicts between protesters and police in the Gulf state of Bahrain for the second day.

On March 23, in the Ecuadorian city of Guayaquil, individuals threw a grenade at the UK's consulate in the city center from a car before quickly fleeing the scene. No victims and only minor material damage were reported. A self-styled People's Revolutionary Militias claimed authorship for the attack via email, justifying it as a reaction to the invasion. In this line, the nearby US-funded North American-Ecuadorian Center would also have been a target. A philosophy student of the University of Guayaquil was arrested two days later in connection to the attack, in alleged possession of radical left-wing propaganda material.

On the live broadcast of the 2003 Academy Awards, several presenters and recipients made various comments against the war ranging from Susan Sarandon giving a simple peace sign to Michael Moore publicly denouncing George W. Bush upon receiving his award.

=== March 24, 2003 ===
Media reports state at least 20,000 school pupils protesting in Hamburg, Germany. After the protest march, conflicts between police and protesters broke out in front of a US building in Hamburg. Protesters who were pushed back by the police began to throw stones, who in turn reacted with water cannons. There have since been serious discussions about police abuses in Hamburg, and political ramifications may follow. In the afternoon, 50,000 people protested peacefully in Leipzig following traditional prayers for peace in the city's Nikolai Church. Prayers for peace and subsequent large demonstrations at that church every Monday ('Montagsdemos') helped bring down the GDR government in East Germany in 1989. The weekly demonstrations, supported by churches, trade unions and other civic organizations, began again in January 2003 in protest to the impending invasion of Iraq. Protest marches in the afternoon were also reported in the German cities of Berlin and Freiburg. In Rome, Milan, Turin and other Italian cities, thousands of pupils and schoolteachers stayed away from school to protest against the Iraq war. The teachers union reported that 60 percent of all schools were closed. The strike had been planned weeks ago as a signal against a school reform bill, but was converted to an anti-war protest. 400 anti-war protesters tried to enter the Australian parliament in Canberra to speak to the prime minister, but were stopped by police. In the Indian state of Andhra Pradesh, Maoist protesters attacked shops selling Coca-Cola and US soft drinks. Protests in front of US buildings and in fast food shops were also held in Indonesia. In Egypt, 12,000 students of two universities in Cairo protested as well as 3,000 people in the Thai capital Bangkok. In Rio de Janeiro, Brazil, 150 activists of the People's Revolutionary Student Movement (MEPR) threw stones and icendiary bombs at the United States consulate and 5 were arrested by the local police.

=== March 25, 2003 ===
Some people demonstrated in Syria against the United States, United Kingdom and Israel. This protest was endorsed by the Syrian government. In Bangladesh, 60,000 people demonstrated. Media also reports protests in front of the South Korean parliament building, linked to plans to bring South Korean forces into the war.

=== March 27, 2003 ===
Hundreds of protesters participated in a civil disobedience in New York City. In a "die-in" organized by the M27 Coalition (an ad-hoc group of various anti-war organizations and individuals), 215 people were arrested after blocking traffic on 5th Avenue near the Rockefeller Center, protesting the cooperation between U.S. media and the government. Protesters also blocked traffic at various sites around the city in a coordinated protest with the theme of "No Business As Usual." Protests also took place across the UK. About 250 students (Police estimate) marched on the US embassy in central London. 200 people (South Wales Police estimate) brought Cardiff city centre traffic to a standstill leading to at least six arrests. There was a lunchtime anti-war demonstration on the Humber bridge in Hull which involved some friction between motorists and protesters. In Derry, up to a dozen anti-war protesters stormed the Raytheon defense technologies company building staging a sit-in until removed by police. Thousands joined a protest in Manchester.

=== March 28, 2003 ===
Global protests did not stop in the second week of war. Some 10,000 protested in Tehran, Iran. Protesters on the march, supported by the government, chanted "Death to Saddam" as well as "Death to America." 50,000 to 80,000 people protested in Cairo, Egypt after the Friday prayers. In Bogotá, Colombia there were violent conflicts in front of the US consulate. Protest marches and demonstrations happened also in Algiers, Algeria and in Bahrain, the Palestinian territories, South Korea, Indonesia and Pakistan. In Australia the police prevented protest marches. In Germany, protests by schoolchildren continued. In New Delhi and elsewhere in India, over 20,000 protested against the war. The largest demonstration comprised mainly Muslims, there was also a separate demonstration mainly made up of communists.

=== March 29, 2003 ===
In Boston, Massachusetts, 50,000 people attended the largest rally in the city since the end of the Vietnam War. Thousands of people blocked Boylston Street in a die-in along the Boston Common. A handful of arrests were made. In the UK hundreds of protesters marched from Cowley into the centre of Oxford and thousands took to the streets of Edinburgh (Police estimated 5,000, while organizers estimated more than 10,000). Edinburgh protesters marched along Princes Street to a mass rally in the city's Meadows area.

=== March 30, 2003 ===
100,000 people marched through the Indonesian capital, Jakarta. According to the BBC's Jonathan Head this was the biggest anti-war demonstration to take place so far in the world's most populous Muslim nation. The day also saw the first officially sanctioned demonstration in China, where a crowd of 200 made up mostly of foreign students were allowed to chant anti-war slogans as they marched past the US embassy in Beijing but around 100 Chinese students had their banners confiscated and were blocked from entering a park where locals had gained permission to demonstrate. In Latin America there were rallies in Santiago, Mexico City, Montevideo, Buenos Aires and Caracas. In Germany at least 40,000 people formed a human chain between the northern cities of Munster and Osnabrueck 35 miles apart. Also about 23,000 took part in marches in Berlin, ending in a rally in Tiergarten park, protests took place in Stuttgart and Frankfurt, where 25 people were arrested as they tried to block the entrance to a US air base. Marches were also held in Paris, Moscow, Budapest, Warsaw and Dublin.

=== April 7, 2003 ===
In Oakland, California, police fired rubber bullets and beanbags at protesters and dockworkers outside the port, injuring at least a dozen demonstrators and six longshoremen standing nearby. Protestors were protesting the Iraq War related action performed by American President Lines and defense contractor Stevedoring Services of America. Most of the 500 demonstrators were dispersed peacefully, but a crowd of demonstrators was blocking traffic on private property near the port and failed to disperse after police warnings. The Oakland Police Chief said demonstrators also threw objects and bolts at the police, and said the use of weapons was necessary to disperse the crowd. He indicated that the rubber bullets were used to respond to direct illegal action and the longshoremen were caught in the crossfire. A dockworker spokesman reported that police gave two minutes to disperse, then opened fire rather than making arrests. Demonstrators also claim that the police took direct aim at them, rather than firing in the air or at the ground. Thirty-one people were arrested. Demonstrators regrouped and marched to the Oakland Federal Building. In New York, United States, protesters targeted the Carlyle Group, an investment firm with deep connections to the war. About 20 protesters were arrested in a planned civil disobedience, but police then also surrounded and arrested close to 100 people who were simply watching the protest from across the street.

=== April 12, 2003 ===
Protests sponsored by A.N.S.W.E.R. were held in Washington, D.C., San Francisco, and Los Angeles to demonstrate against the Iraq War three days after the fall of Baghdad. In Washington, the march route took the group of 30,000 past offices of several mass media organizations, and companies such as Bechtel and Halliburton.

== Occupation of Iraq ==
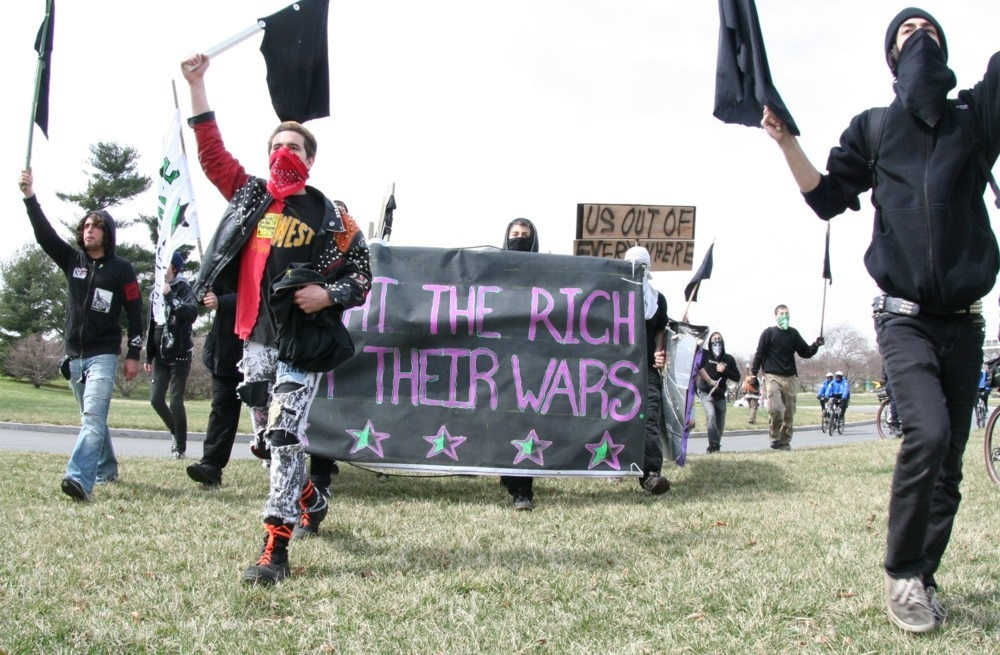
A black bloc group marches as part of an Iraq War protest in Washington, D.C., March 21, 2009. The full text of the banner reads, "Fight the rich, not their wars."

Following the Invasion, both protests and armed combat experienced a temporary decline in intensity. Protests against the war as a whole continued, often on the occasion of anniversaries of the war and visits by members of the Bush administration to foreign cities. Within the United States, general anti-war protests were joined by protests focusing on particular issues or strategies including: opposition to torture and abuse (such as that in the Abu Ghraib prison), calls for withdrawal of members of the coalition from Iraq, counter-recruitment, support for military resisters such as Lt. Ehren Watada, and opposition to military and corporate contractors. The largest protests during this period have been national, multi-issue mobilizations such as those on August 30, 2004, and April 29, 2006. Black bloc elements were present during some of the protests.

=== October 25, 2003 ===
Tens of thousands of people demonstrated in Washington, D.C., San Francisco, Reno, Nevada, and other cities around the world, in opposition to the occupation of Iraq. Protesters also advocated for the return of American troops to the United States, and for the protection of civil liberties.

The Washington, D.C., rally attracted 20,000 (BBC estimate) protesters. The protest ended with a rally at the Washington Monument, within sight of the White House. Protesters also called for the repeal of the USA PATRIOT Act. The Washington and San Francisco protests were jointly organized by ANSWER (Act Now to Stop War and End Racism) and United for Peace and Justice.

A pro-war demonstration in Washington organized by Free Republic attracted only dozens (BBC estimate) of people.

=== November 20, 2003 ===
George Bush's state visit to the UK was met with peaceful anti-war protests in London, attracting 100,000 (police estimate) to 200,000 (organisers' estimate) people, and culminating in the toppling of an effigy of Bush in Trafalgar Square.

=== June 4, 2004 ===
More than 100,000 people demonstrated in Rome and other Italian cities during Bush's visit to Pope John Paul II, who had expressed his opposition to the war in numerous occasions. Ten thousand police patrolled the conference site.

=== June 5, 2004 ===
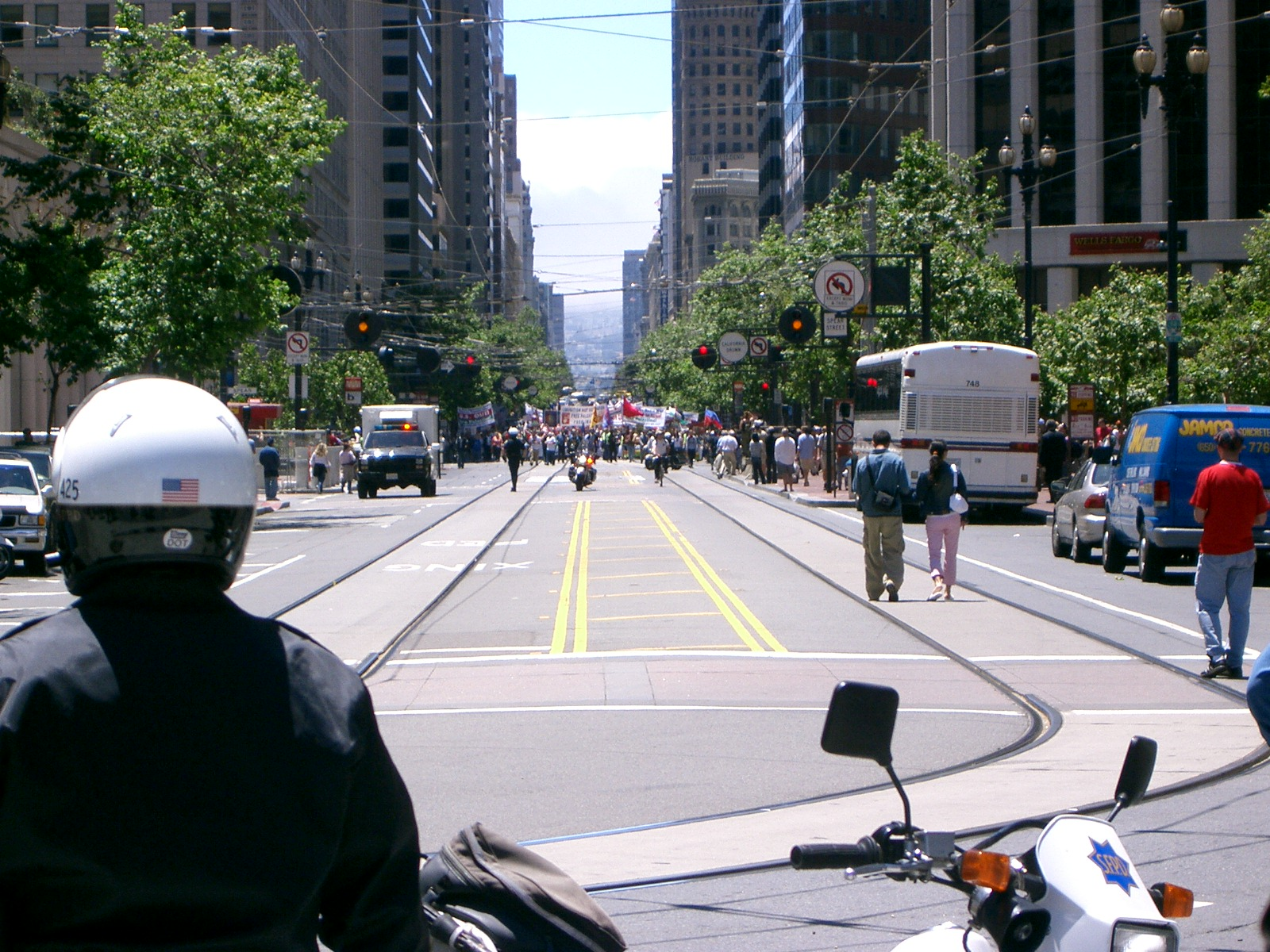
A group of anti-war protesters approaches a police barricade. The procession reached back nearly three miles as marchers walked from San Francisco Civic Center to the Financial District.

ANSWER Coalition sponsored a demonstration in Washington, D.C., marching from the White House through working-class neighborhoods to the house of Donald Rumsfeld on Kalorama Road NW near Embassy Row. In addition, more than 10,000 citizens marched in San Francisco, as well as a counter-protest with hundreds of pro-war supporters.

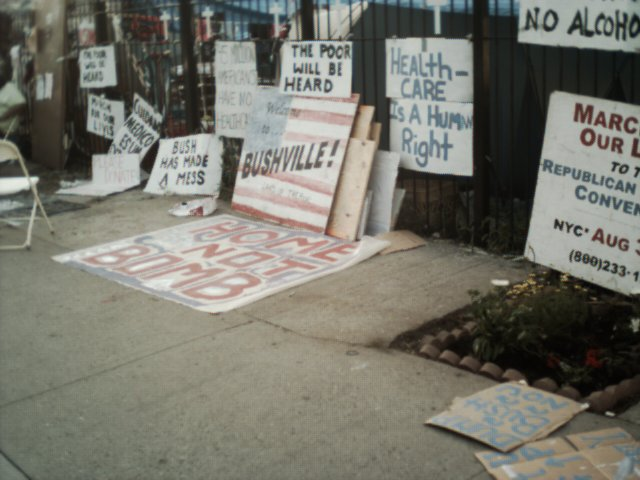
Signs outside the mobile Bushville in Brooklyn

=== August 29, 2004 ===
As part of the 2004 Republican National Convention protests, United for Peace and Justice organized a mass march, one of the largest in U.S. history, in which protesters marched past Madison Square Garden, the site of the convention. The march included hundreds of separate contingents as well as individual marchers. The group One Thousand Coffins held a procession of one thousand full-scale flag-draped cardboard coffins, commemorating each of the U.S. fallen troops as of that date, carried by a nationwide coalition of citizens, veterans, clergy and families of the fallen. Several hundred members of Billionaires for Bush held a mock countermarch. Estimates of crowd size ranged from 120,000 (unnamed police spokesman) to over 500,000 (organizers, second unnamed police source). In March, 2007 NYPD Deputy Commissioner Paul Browne stated about the RNC protests: "You certainly had 800,000 on August 29th."

Organizers held a pre-march press conference in front of thousands on 7th Avenue. Several people spoke in opposition to the war in Iraq and Bush administration policies including Michael Moore, Jesse Jackson, Congressman Charles Rangel, and a father who had lost his son in Iraq. The whole event lasted six hours, with the lead contingent finishing the march long before thousands of people could even move from the starting point. The City government, under Republican Mayor Michael Bloomberg, had earlier denied the protesters a permit to hold a rally in Central Park following the march, citing concern for the park's grass. The West Side Highway was offered instead, but organizers refused, citing exorbitant costs for the extra sound equipment and problems for the location. Organizers encouraged people to go to Central Park following the march's conclusion in Union Square. Disturbances were minor. New York Commissioner Raymond W. Kelly reported about 200 arrests with 9 felonies—most of them occurring after the march had concluded.

=== October 2, 2004 ===
A large group of people assembled at the Women's Memorial at Arlington National Cemetery for the National Memorial Procession, described as "A Trail of Mourning and Truth from Iraq to the White House". The theme of the event was "Mourn the dead. Heal the wounded. End the war." Participants were encouraged to dress in black to symbolize mourning. Cindy Sheehan was among the participants at this demonstration. Speeches were made by veterans, members of military families, family members of fallen soldiers, and others. Following the speeches, participants marched from Arlington National Cemetery to the Ellipse in Washington, D.C., carrying cardboard coffins to symbolize the war dead. Following the march, another rally was held, where the coffins carried on the march were placed with more coffins placed at the Ellipse earlier. Following the second rally, 28 people, including Michael Berg (father of the American civilian contractor Nicholas Berg who was killed by insurgents in Iraq), were arrested while attempting to deliver the names of fallen heroes to the White House.

=== October 17, 2004 ===
Approximately 10,000 people attending the Million Worker March in Washington, D.C., conducted a pro-labor demonstration, with a very heavy additional focus against the war in Iraq as well.

=== November 30, 2004 ===
Two protests were held in Ottawa against George W. Bush's first official visit to Canada. A rally and march in the early afternoon was upwards of fifteen thousand (or 5,000 according to police). An evening rally on Parliament Hill drew another 15,000 and featured a speech by Brandon Hughey, an American soldier seeking refuge in Canada after refusing to fight in Iraq. Bush's stop on 1 December in Halifax, Nova Scotia, drew between 4,000 and 5,000 protesters.

=== January 20, 2005 ===
Thousands of people attended multiple protest rallies and marches held throughout Washington, D.C., on the day of George W. Bush's second inaugural to protest the war in Iraq and other policies of the Bush administration.

=== March 19, 2005 ===
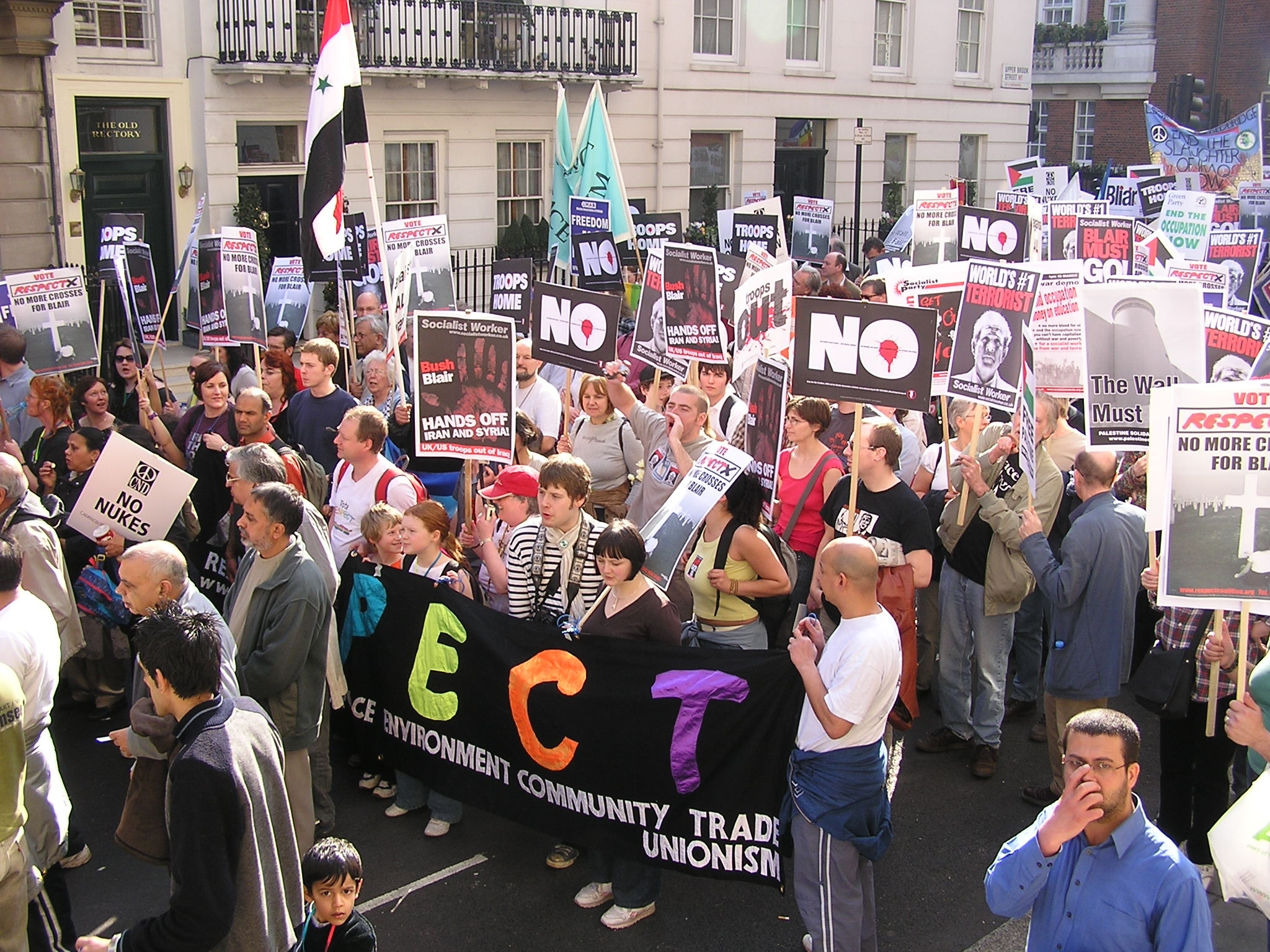
Protesters on 19 March 2005, in London, where organizers claim over 150,000 marched

Protests to mark the second anniversary of start of the Iraq War were held across the world, in the U.S., United Kingdom, Canada, Central America, South America, Europe, Australia, New Zealand, Africa, Asia and the Middle East. (Some protests were also held on March 20). In Glasgow, Scotland about 1,000 people (BBC estimate) attended a rally where some of the names of people who had so-far died in the conflict were read out, along with a "name and shame" list of Scottish MPs who backed the war. Speakers included Maxine Gentle, whose soldier brother Gordon was killed in Iraq. According to a survey (mainly of the reports of organizers), it has been claimed that, across the world, over one million people marched. The protests had been called by the Anti-War Assembly of the 2005 World Social Forum an annual conference of the alternative globalization movement which took place in Porto Alegre, Brazil on 26 January – 31, and were supported by coalitions from all over the world.

=== June 21, 2005 ===
An officer of the German army, Major Florian Pfaff, was exonerated by the Bundesverwaltungsgericht (German administrative court) after refusing to take part in the development of software likely to be used in the Iraq War.

=== August 6, 2005 to August 31, 2005 ===
Cindy Sheehan, mother of slain U.S. soldier Casey Sheehan, set up a protest camp outside the ranch of vacationing president George W. Bush in Crawford, Texas. Sheehan, who previously met with Bush in a short encounter before the media that she described as dismissive and disrespectful, demanded that Bush meet with her and stop using the deaths of soldiers, including her son, as a justification for remaining in Iraq.

=== September 24, 2005 ===
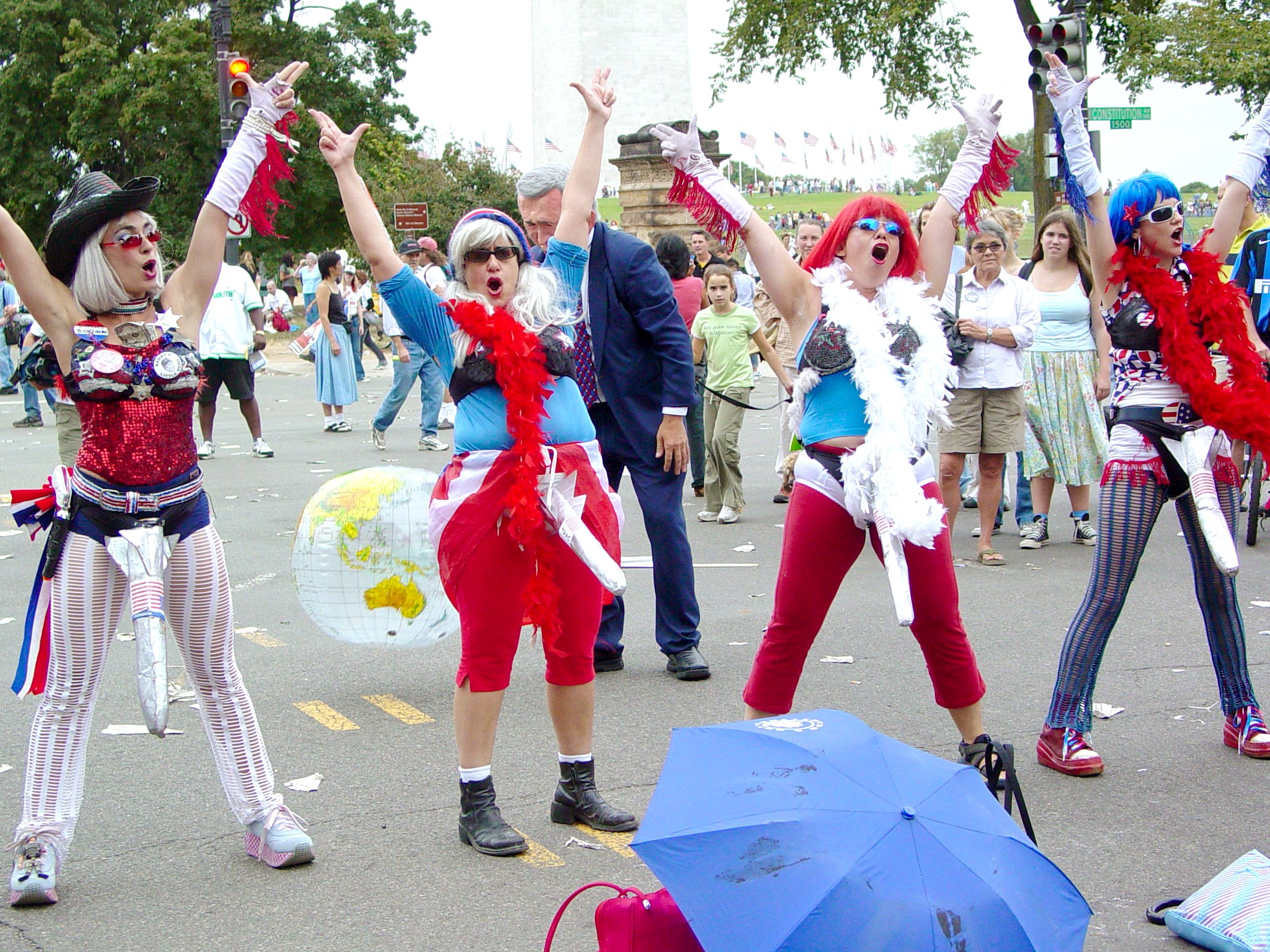
Women dressed in red, white, and blue outfits with missiles strapped around their hips do cheers in the street during the September 24 protest in Washington DC.

Protests were held in the US and Europe. Police estimated that about 150,000 people took part in Washington, D.C., 15,000 in Los Angeles, California, 10,000 in London, 20,000 in San Francisco, and more than 2,000 in San Diego, California. Additionally, in London, organizers claim 100,000 attended similar protests, but police place the figure at 10,000.

=== November 4–5, 2005 ===
Massive popular demonstrations against the U.S.-led war in Iraq, in addition to U.S.-backed economic policies in Latin America, were held in Argentina surrounding the November 4–5 Fourth Summit of the Americas.

=== March 18–20, 2006 ===
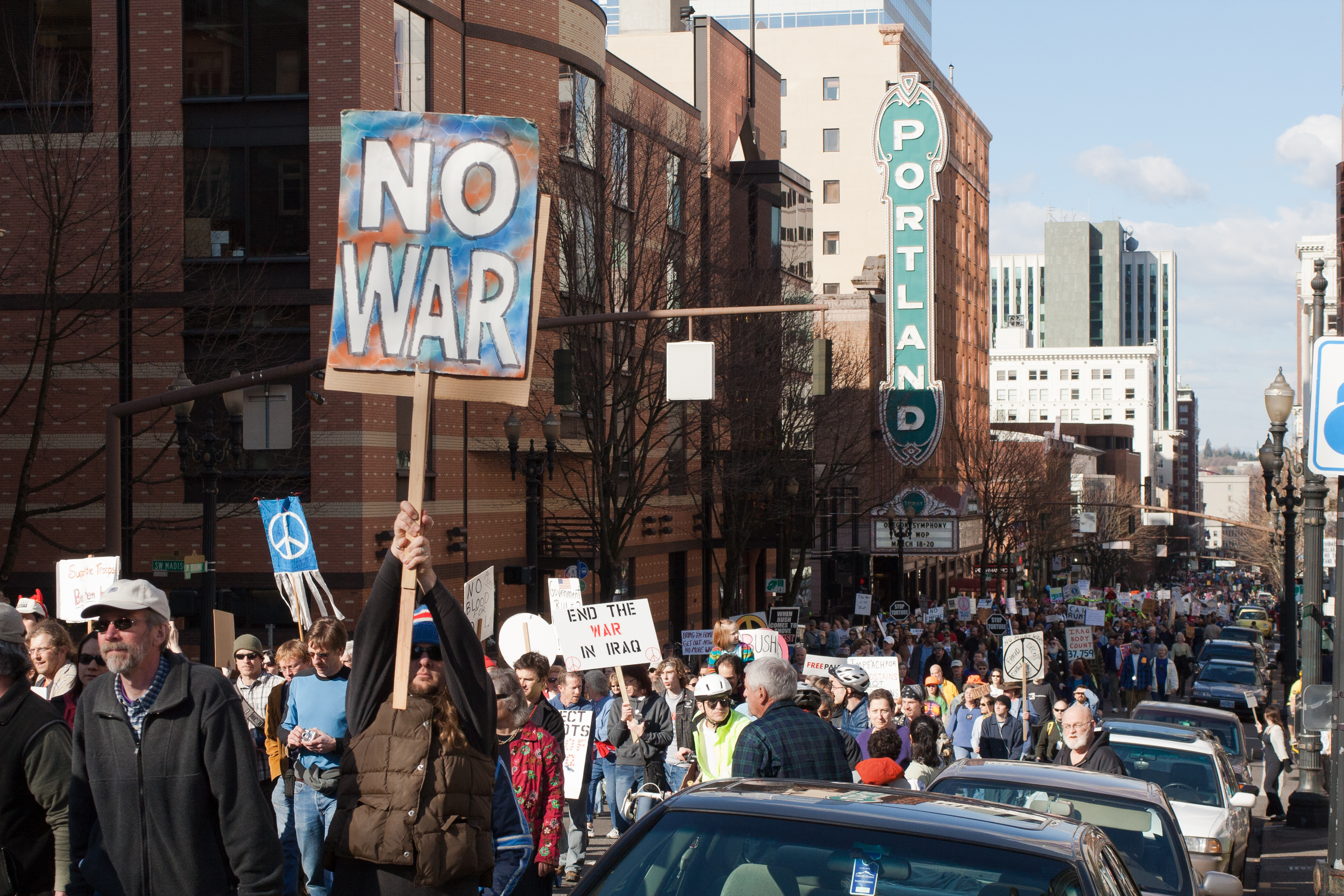
Protestors in Portland, Oregon, on March 19, 2006

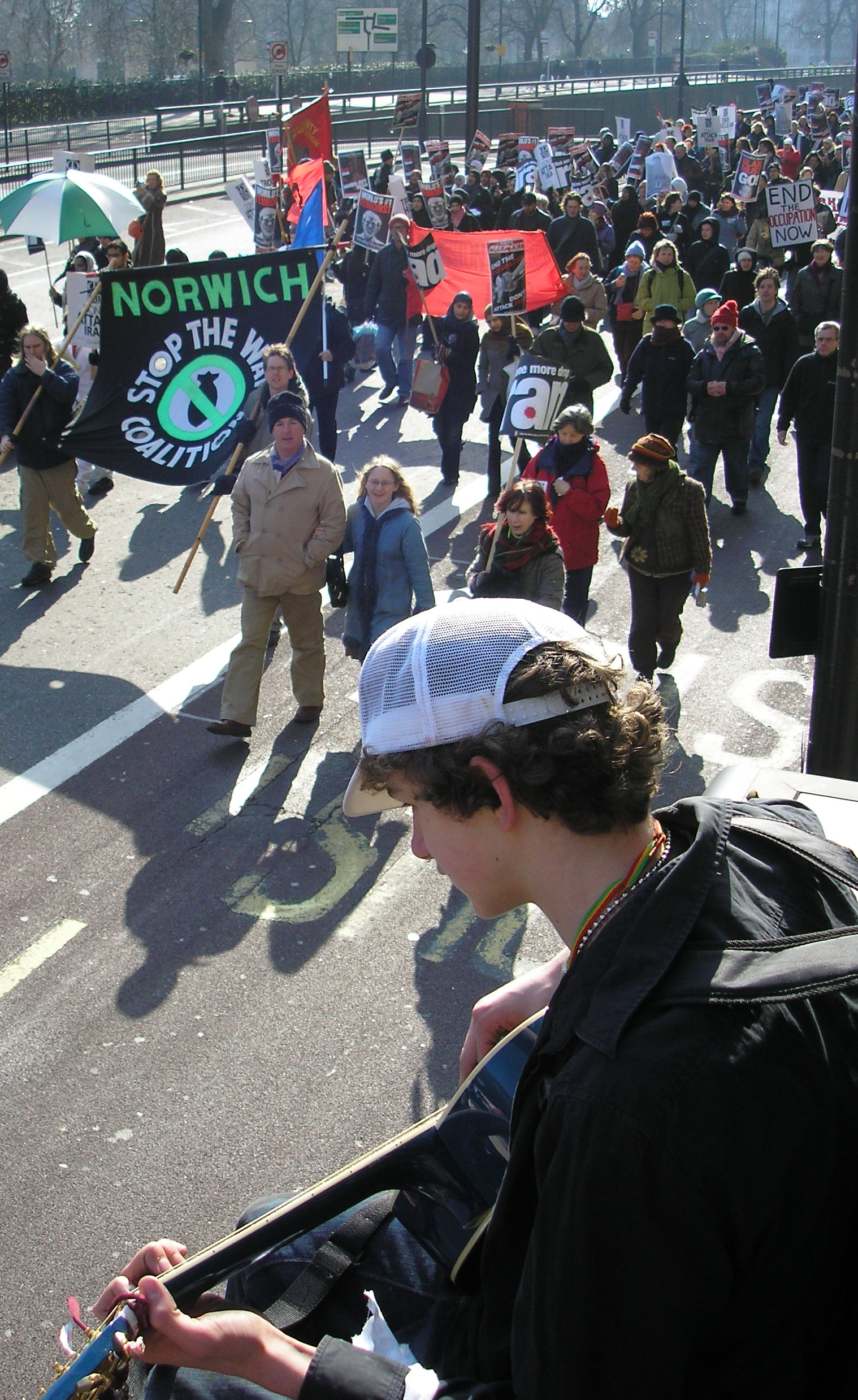
Demonstrators in London

Coordinated protests were held to mark the third anniversary of the invasion of Iraq. Major protests occurred in Baghdad, Basra, London, New York City, Washington, D.C., Portland, Oregon, Madrid, Rome, Sydney, Tokyo, Seoul, Istanbul, Toronto and Dublin. Demonstration organizers in London said this marks the first coordinated protest in Iraq, Britain and the United States. More than 500 antiwar events were planned for the week of March 15–21 in the United States; thousands or tens of thousands demonstrated in San Francisco, New York City, Los Angeles, and Chicago.

In Washington, D.C., 200 people marched to The Pentagon to deliver a faux coffin and bag of ashes to United States Secretary of Defense Donald Rumsfeld. Two dozen people were arrested for crossing over a barrier around the Pentagon in an act of civil disobedience. They were cited for "failure to obey lawful orders," according to Cheryl Irwin, a Pentagon spokeswoman. Footage from the protest was incorporated into this scene from the movie The Identified.

Turn-out for the United States events was damaged by splits between organizing groups such as UFPJ and ANSWER.

=== April 1, 2006 ===
Thousands from around the south marched in Atlanta, Georgia, from the King Center to a rally at Piedmont Park to mark the 3rd anniversary of the Iraq war and the 38th anniversary of the assassination of Rev. Martin Luther King Jr. The Southern Regional March for Peace in Iraq/Justice at Home was organized by the April 1st Coalition and speakers included Dr. Joseph Lowery, Rev. Tim McDonald, and Damu Smith. (Jose Reynoso)

=== April 29, 2006 ===
A coalition of United States-based groups, initiated by United for Peace and Justice, Rainbow/PUSH Coalition, National Organization for Women, Friends of the Earth, U.S. Labor Against the War, Climate Crisis Coalition, People's Hurricane Relief Fund, National Youth and Student Peace Coalition, and Veterans for Peace held a national mobilization against the war in New York City on April 29.

=== May 22–31, 2006 ===
Members of the Port Militarization Resistance in Olympia, WA protested the shipment of 300 Army Stryker vehicles to Iraq through the Port of Olympia. Dozens of arrests resulted from the direct actions of protesters such as locking arms to block roads which the Army used to reach the port.

=== August 9, 2006 ===
Nine members of the Derry Anti-War Coalition, based in Northern Ireland, entered the Derry premises of Raytheon. The occupation of the plant lasted for eight hours, after which point riot police entered the building and removed the occupants. Charges of aggravated burglary and unlawful entry were brought against all nine.

=== September 23, 2006 ===
A national anti-war demonstration took place in Manchester, England coinciding with the Labour Party Annual Conference which also took place in the city on this date. The organisers, the Stop the War Coalition, estimated 50,000 people on the march. Police estimates were initially 8,000 revised upwards to 20,000. The local Stop the War organisers considered that it was the largest demonstration in the history of the city since Chartist times in the mid-19th century. The event was followed by a Stop the War Alternative conference (alternative, that is, to the stage-managed Labour Conference).

=== October 5, 2006 ===
Actions across the United States took place in nearly every state. An organization called World Can't Wait organized the nationwide event. Demonstrations took place in vicinities such as New York City, Los Angeles, San Francisco, Chicago, Houston, and other places. Over 200 protests were organized.

=== November 3, 2006 ===
Malachi Ritscher committed suicide by self-immolation on the side of the Kennedy Expressway near downtown Chicago during the morning rush hour of Friday, November 3, 2006, apparently as a protest against the Iraq war and more generally "for the mayhem and turmoil caused by my country".

=== January 4, 2007 ===
The court martial of military resister Lt. Ehren Watada has been marked by protests. On January 4, 2007, Iraq Veterans Against the War Deployed established a protest camp called "Camp Resistance" at Fort Lewis in support of Watada. The same day, some 200 people protested his prosecution in San Francisco, with twenty-eight arrested after engaging in civil disobedience.

=== January 10–11, 2007 ===
Numerous groups organized demonstrations in response to a January 10 speech by George W. Bush, announcing an increase of U.S. troop levels in Iraq by 21,500. A small number of protests occurred in the wake of the Wednesday night speech, including one in Boston which resulted in 6 arrests for blocking traffic. Organizers from MoveOn.org and TrueMajority.org each received reports of some 500–600 protests that were held nationwide on January 11.

=== January 27, 2007 ===
The January 27, 2007, Iraq War protest drew anywhere from "tens of thousands" to "hundreds of thousands" Washington, D.C., to protest.

=== March 11, 2007 ===
In Tacoma, Washington, peace activists campaigned to prevent the military from shipping 300 Stryker armored vehicles to Iraq. 23 protesters were arrested including T.J. Johnson who serves in the City Council of Olympia. The arrests came shortly after a small convoy of 12 to 15 Army vehicles arrived at a storage yard at the port. More vehicles, including Stryker armored fighting vehicles, arrived late Monday and early Tuesday, as protesters shouted the chants "You don't have to go" and "We are the majority."

=== March 16, 2007 ===
Roughly 100 protesters were arrested in front of the White House following a service at Washington National Cathedral in commemoration of the fourth anniversary of the Iraq War and a march to the White House.

=== March 17, 2007 ===
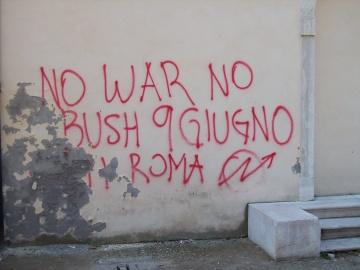
August 2007 anti-war graffiti in Venice, Italy

Approximately 10,000 to 20,000 anti-war protesters marched to The Pentagon in Arlington, Virginia, with several thousand pro-war protesters lining the route. Other protests and counter-demonstrations in the USA were held in Austin, Texas, Seattle, Washington, Chicago, Illinois, Los Angeles, California (5,000 to 6,000), San Francisco, California, San Diego, California, and Hartford, Connecticut. Tens of thousands marched in Madrid, Spain, with smaller protests in Turkey, Greece, Australia, Belgium, Britain, and Canada.

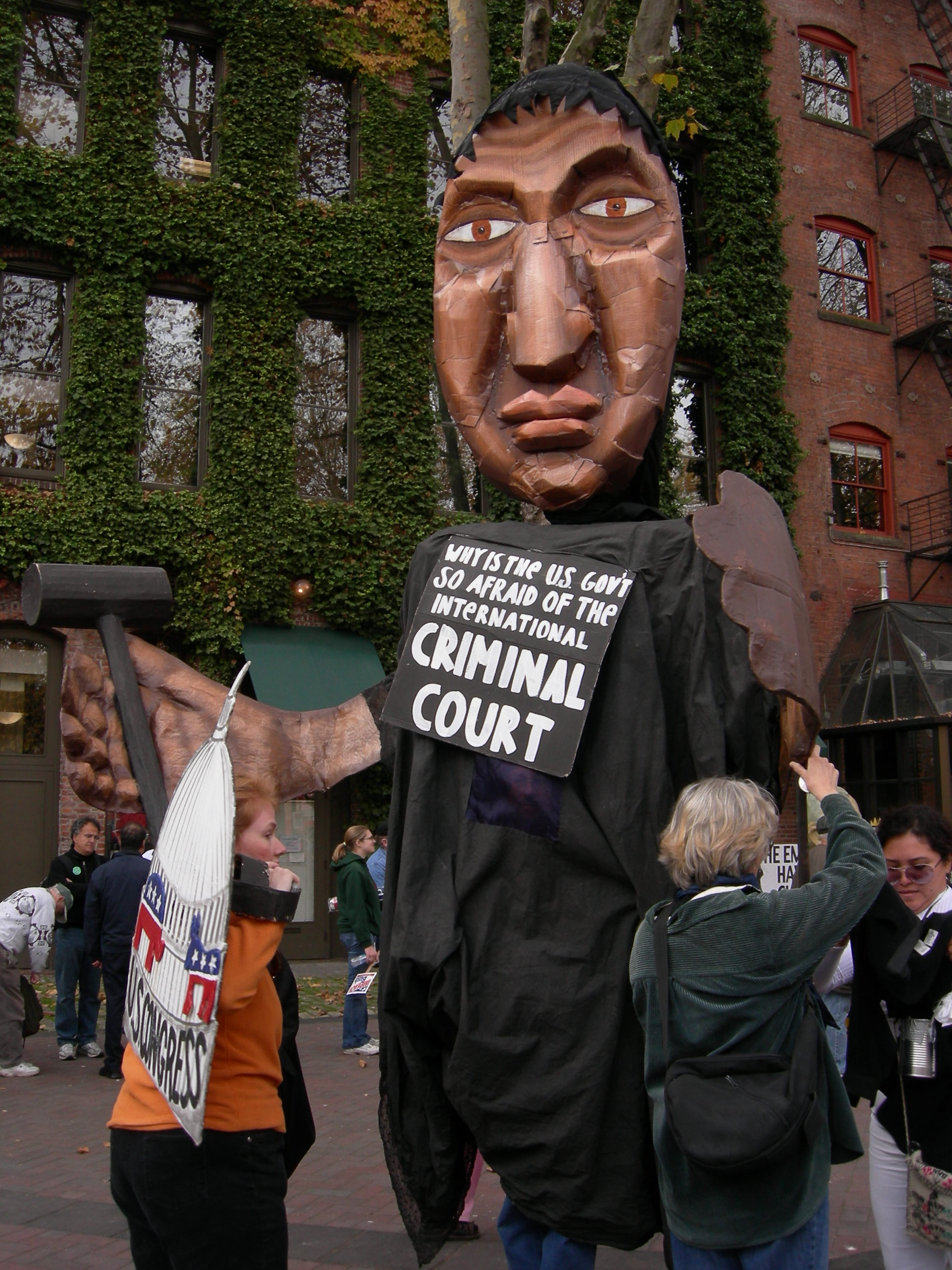
October 2007, protest against the Iraq War in Seattle, Occidental Park sign on a giant puppet says "Why is the U.S. gov't so afraid of the International Criminal Court"

=== September 15, 2007 ===
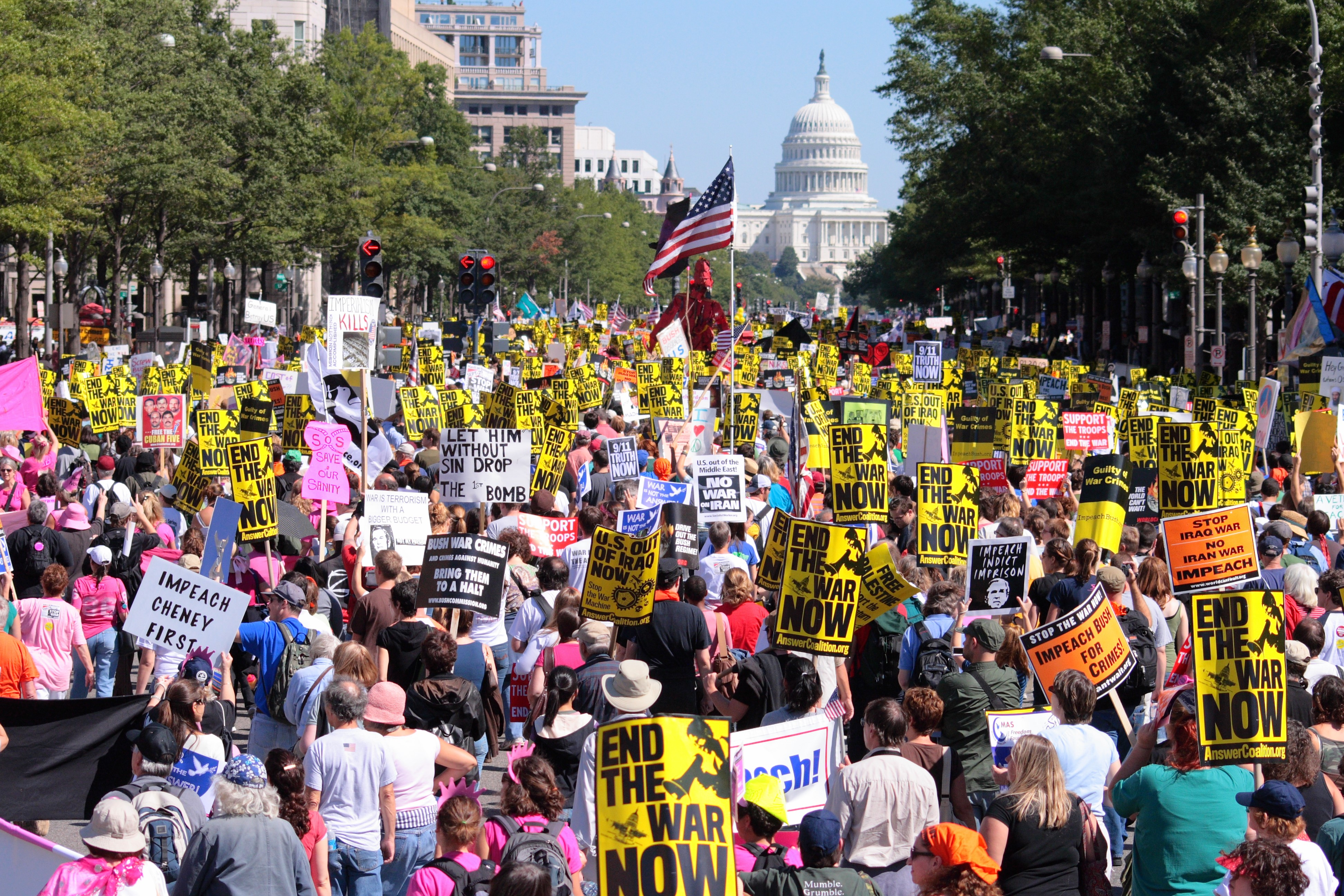
Protesters march down Pennsylvania Avenue toward the Capitol.

A march took place from the White House to the Capitol on September 15, 2007. It was organized by Veterans for Peace and the Answer Coalition. Volunteers were recruited for a civil disobedience action, which included a die-in. Volunteers signed up to take on the name of a soldier or civilian who died because of the war, and lay down around the Peace Monument. In attendance were politicians such as Ralph Nader. Police arrested more than 190 demonstrators who crossed police lines in front of the Capitol. Chemical spray was used by Capitol Police.

Organizers estimated that nearly 100,000 people attended the rally and march. That number could not be confirmed; police did not give their own estimate. Associated press reported "several thousand." A permit for the march obtained in advance by the ANSWER Coalition had projected 10,000.

=== September 29, 2007 ===
Troops Out Now Coalition organized a rally and march starting from the encampment in front of the Capitol Building. TroopsOutNow.org estimated 5,000 marched. A group of protesters, mainly youth, blocked sections of Constitution and Pennsylvania Avenue, including portions not on the march route. As of 8:40 PM, September 29, the demonstrators had set up tents and had not moved, after occupying the street for over four hours.

=== March 19, 2008 ===
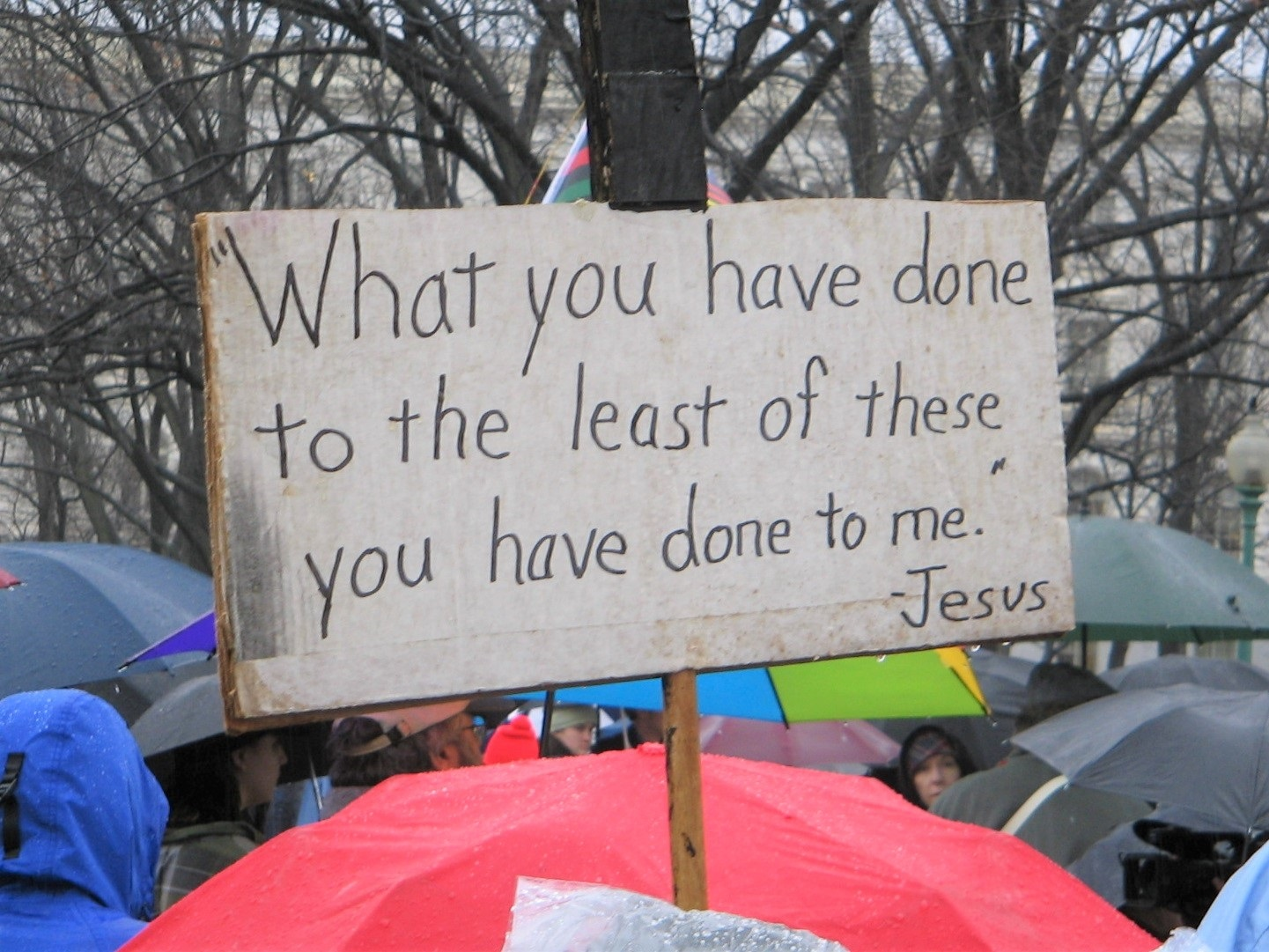
Protests were also held on several days leading to the five-year anniversary of the war, including Christian groups marching in Washington, D.C.

Thousands of anti-war protesters marched through Washington, D.C., on the fifth anniversary of the U.S.-led 2003 invasion of Iraq, some splattering red paint on government offices and scuffling with police. Protesters, including many veterans, demanded the arrests of President George W. Bush, Vice President Dick Cheney and Secretary of State Condoleezza Rice as war criminals. Others hurled balloons full of paint at a military recruiting station and smeared it on buildings housing defense contractors Bechtel and Lockheed Martin.

Several other protests took place during the days leading up to the five-year anniversary of the Iraq War. On March 7, in Washington, D.C., for example, several churches held services to pray for the safety of U.S. troops and an end to the war. In the afternoon the churchgoers marched to the Hart Senate Office Building with the intention of asking U.S. senators to discontinue U.S.-funded terrorism. At least forty of the protesters were arrested as they entered the building and began praying for peace.

=== March 21, 2009 ===
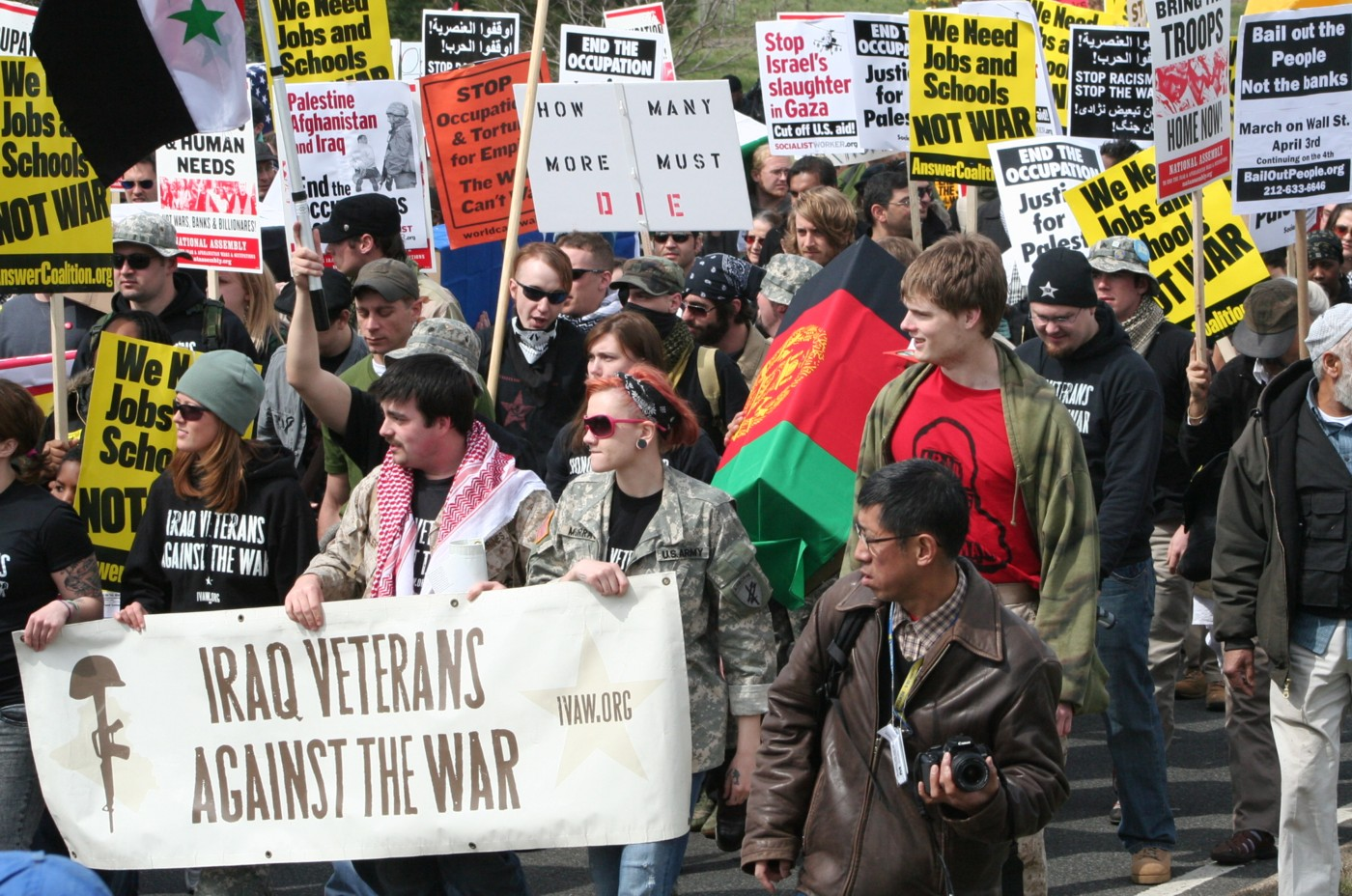
Protesters en route to the Pentagon.

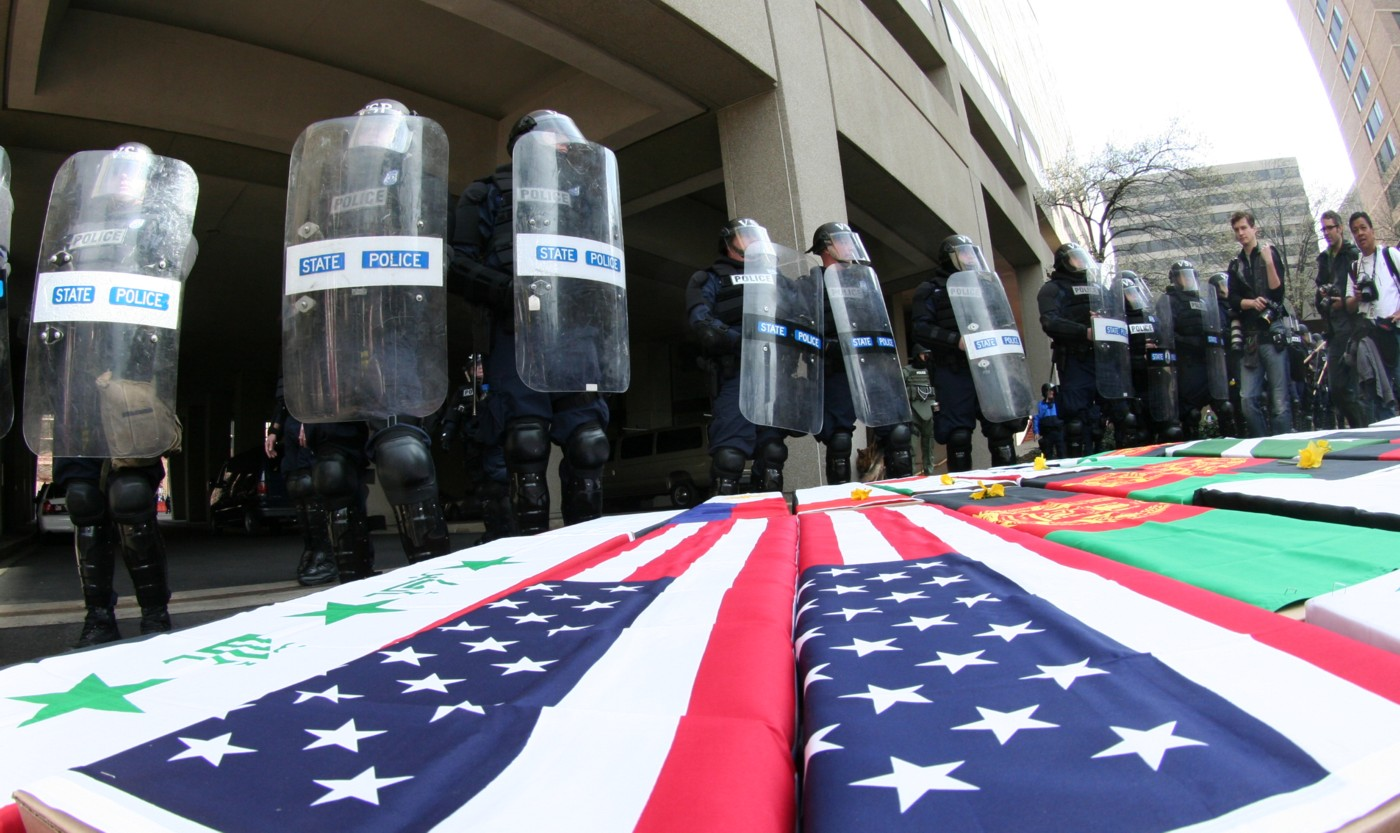
Mock coffins placed near the offices of defense contractors.

Thousands of protesters marched from the Mall in Washington, D.C., to the grounds of the Pentagon, and then to the Crystal City district of Arlington, Virginia. This area of Arlington is the home to offices of several defense contractors, such as KBR and General Dynamics. Protesters carried mock coffins representing the victims of U.S. conflicts and placed them in front of the office buildings. Virginia State police and Arlington County police greeted the protesters and reported no arrests. Among the protesters was a group of black bloc members.

=== April 4, 2009 ===
United for Peace and Justice held a march on Wall Street on April 4, 2009, against military spending in Iraq.

=== March 20, 2010 ===
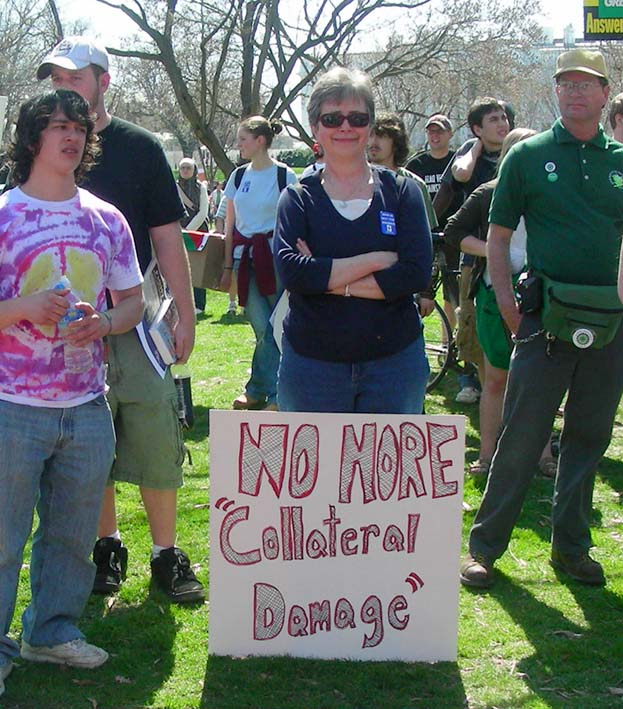
Protester holds sign at March 20, 2010 anti-war protest

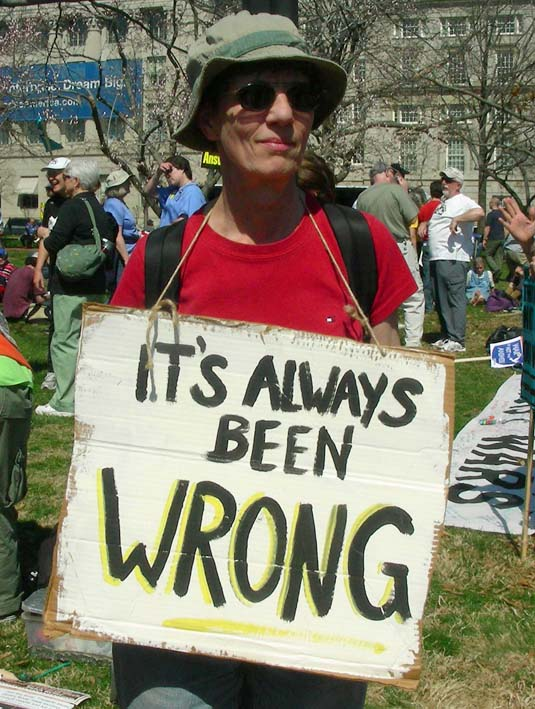
Protester holds sign at March 20, 2010 anti-war protest

On March 20, 2010, a multi-city anti-war event was held in the United States to protest the U.S. wars in Afghanistan and Iraq. The event was organized by A.N.S.W.E.R. with support from other civil society actors such as the Topanga Peace Alliance and the Teamsters. The scheduling of the event ties it to the seventh anniversary of the start of the U.S. invasion of Iraq in 2003. In Washington, D.C., thousands marched past the White House, some bearing coffins draped with various flags to symbolize fatalities of the wars. Others enacted mock attacks on the White House using cardboard combat drones. A parallel demonstration took place in Hollywood, California called "U.S. Out of Afghanistan and Iraq Now!". In addition to the big NGOs, this was supported by local grassroots organisations such as LA Workers' Voice and Long Beach Area Peace Network. Thousands of people slowly made their way down Hollywood Boulevard at 2 p.m. dressed as zombies and other undead.

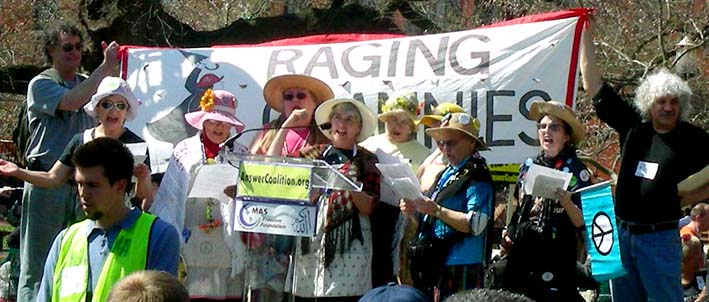
Raging Grannies sing at the March 20, 2010 anti-war protest in Washington, DC

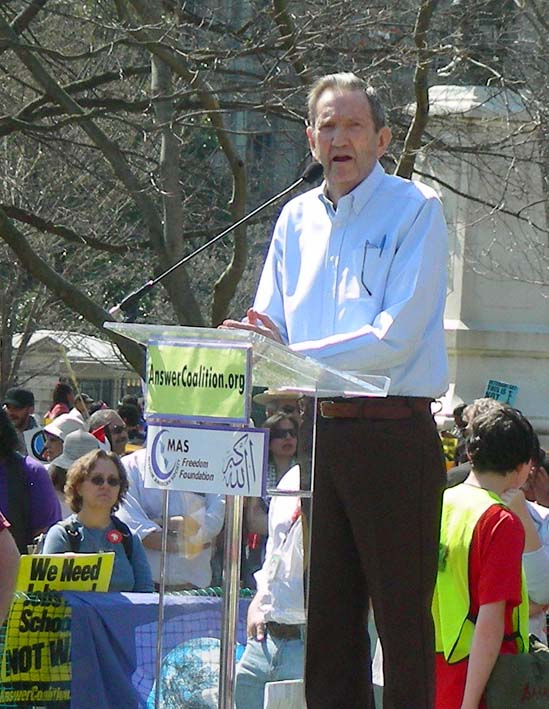
Ramsey Clark speaks at the March 20, 2010, anti-war protest

=== March 19, 2011 ===
Over 100 protesters were arrested outside the White House. More protesters gathered in Hollywood.

=== April 9 – May 26, 2011 ===
Beginning on April 9, 2011, the 8th anniversary of the fall of Saddam Hussein, Arab Spring protests in Iraq escalated, with thousands protesting in Baghdad's Liberation Square and all over the country. The protests extended to anger at the US occupation, and culminated on May 26, 2011, with a demonstration organized by Muqtada al-Sadr. Reports of participants vary from 100,000 (Iraq's official Al Sabaah) to 500,000 people (Baghdad's independent New Sabah ^{[ar]}).

== Post-war protests ==
=== May 20, 2012 ===
Veterans for Peace, Occupy Chicago and a slew of coalition partners convened the No-NATO protests in Chicago. About 8,000 marchers took Michigan Avenue the full length to Cermak, within several blocks of the NATO Summit at the Hyatt Regency.

At the intersection of Cermak and Michigan, Iraq Veterans Against the War convened a rally. For the second time in United States history, soldiers and marines relinquished their military medals. The first time this occurred was in 1971.

=== March 18, 2023 ===
In Washington, D.C., peace rallies from around 200 organizations are held to mark the twentieth anniversary of the start of the Iraq War. Protesters called for an end to US involvement in the Russian invasion of Ukraine as well as US militarism in general. Protesters also call for the disbandment of NATO.

== Criticism ==
Anarchist author and activist Peter Gelderloos has criticized the protests against the Iraq War for their complete ineffectiveness at stopping the war.

Americans on the political right were highly critical of the protesters, accusing them of giving aid and comfort to the enemy, if not outright treason. One notable group, Protest Warrior, actively counter-protested during anti-war demonstrations. Founded in 2003, Protest Warrior infiltrated liberal protests with signs that satirized leftist positions and expressed support for U.S. military action. The group saw the anti-war protests as damaging to troop morale and argued that they bolstered regimes like Saddam Hussein's. During the 2004 Republican National Convention, Protest Warriors staged multiple counter-protests, though their confrontational approach sometimes led to friction with liberal demonstrators and even law enforcement.

=== Protest Warrior ===
Protest Warrior was a conservative political activist group founded in 2003 by Alan Lipton and Kfir Alfia in Austin, Texas. Best known for counter-protesting anti-war rallies, the group used the slogan "Fighting the left...doing it right." It has been inactive since the mid-2010s.

Lipton and Alfia first drew national notice on 16 February 2003 when they appeared at an anti-war march in San Francisco with satirical placards, an episode later profiled in The New York Times. Conservative broadcaster Rush Limbaugh promoted the stunt, boosting the group’s visibility. Protest Warrior argued that liberal activism demoralized U.S. troops and sought to inject a pro-war voice into what it viewed as left-leaning media coverage.

The group’s signature tactic was to infiltrate demonstrations with professionally printed signs that appeared supportive from afar but revealed pro-war messages up close. Operations were coordinated through its website, which also hosted forums, a sign-generator and an online store. In January 2005 hacker Jeremy Hammond stole credit-card data from the site and disabled the server; he later received a two-year prison sentence.

Protest Warrior mounted counter-protests at events such as the 2004 Republican National Convention and the second inauguration of President George W. Bush. Its confrontational style sometimes backfired; at a 2005 rally in Crawford, Texas, fellow conservatives mistakenly ejected the group, thinking the activists were anti-war protesters.

By late 2006 the forums had closed, a planned “Protest Warrior 2.0” relaunch stalled after a handful of blog posts, and the LLC is listed by the Texas Comptroller as “Not In Good Standing.” The website remains largely defunct.

== See also ==
- Iraq War resisters in Canada
- International reactions to the prelude to the Iraq War
- International public opinion on the war in Afghanistan
- List of anti-war organizations
- List of Iraq War resisters
- List of rallies and protest marches in Washington, D.C.
- Opposition to the Iraq War
- Public opinion in the United States on the invasion of Iraq
- Post–September 11 anti-war movement
- Protests against the 2011 military intervention in Libya
- Protests against the war in Afghanistan
- United Nations Security Council and the Iraq War
- Views on the 2003 invasion of Iraq
- Withdrawal of United States troops from Iraq (2007–2011)
- The Ground Truth, a 2006 documentary film about veterans of the Iraq War.
- We Are Many, a 2014 documentary film by Amir Amirani.
- Protests against the Russian invasion of Ukraine
- Gaza war protests

=== General anti-war ===
- Anti-war
- Civil disobedience
- Nonviolence
- Pacifism
- Why We Fight, a 2005 documentary film about the military–industrial complex, and its rise particularly prior to the 2003 Invasion of Iraq.
