= Leslie Cagan =

American activist, writer, and socialist organizer

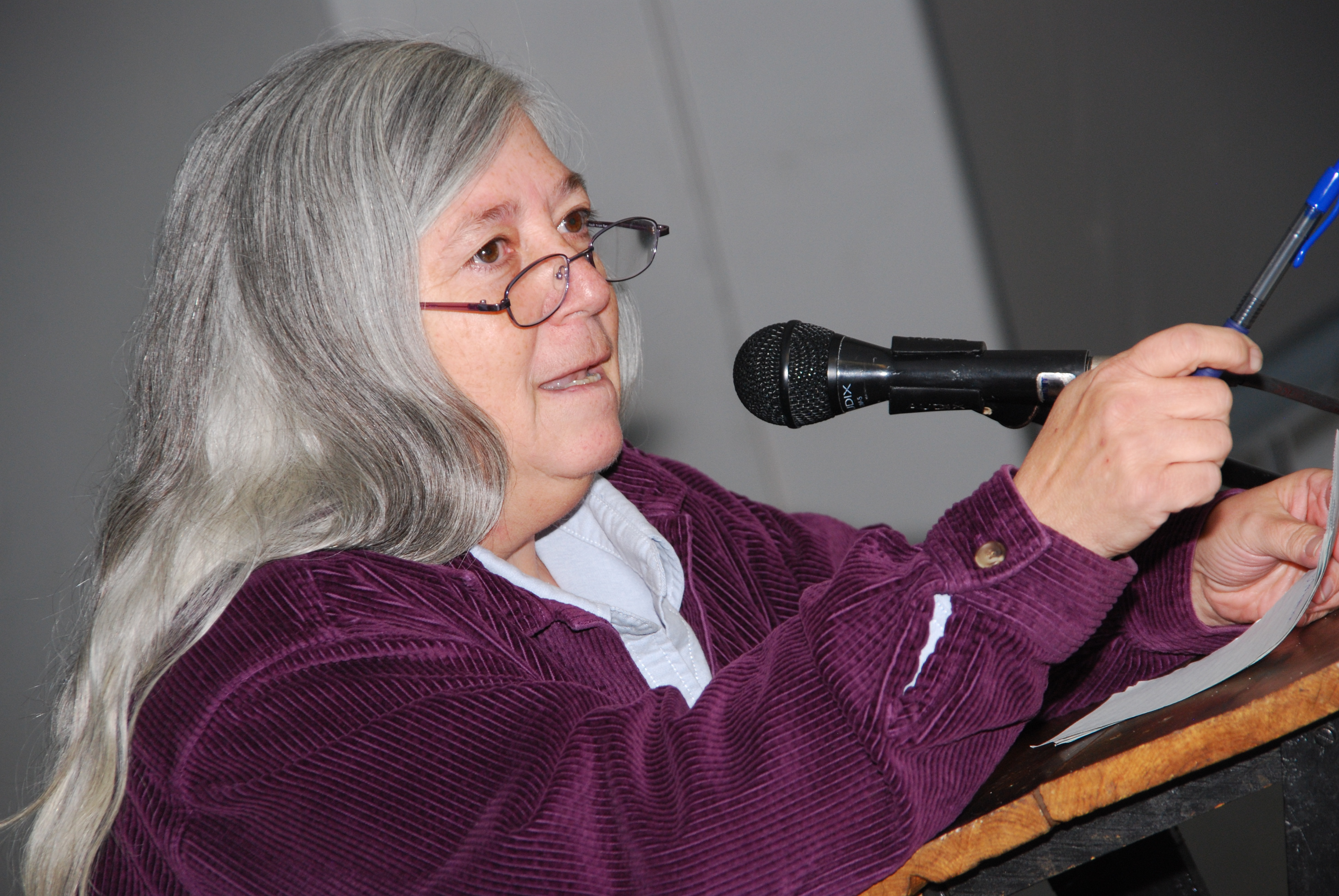
- Leslie Cagan, 2009
- Born: 1947 (age 78–79); The Bronx, New York, U.S.
- Occupations: Social justice advocate LGBT advocate
- Years active: 1969 - Present
- Known for: Pacifism; Gender Equality Advocacy

Leslie Cagan is an American activist, writer, and socialist organizer involved with the peace and social justice movements. She is the former national coordinator of United for Peace and Justice, the former co-chair of Committees of Correspondence for Democracy and Socialism.

== Early life ==
Cagan was born in 1947 to a Jewish couple in The Bronx, New York City, in what she described as a "red diaper" family. She attended her first political rally as a young child in the 1950s, accompanied by her parents, who were former members of the Communist Party. Her grandmother, a seamstress, was a founding member of the Amalgamated Clothing Workers Union. She graduated from New York University in 1968 with a degree in art history.

== Career ==
In 1969, Cagan was among the first participants in the Venceremos Brigade, groups of young adults who visited Cuba and joined Cuban farmworkers to harvest sugar cane. During her journey to Havana, Cagan told an Associated Press reporter: "All of us support the Cuban Revolution and feel that by going and working with the Cubans we can show that support."

After choosing to skip graduate school, Cagan began her lifetime career of promoting various causes, predominantly in the anti-war movement, the anti-nuclear movement, the LGBT rights movement, the feminist movement, and normalization of relations with Cuba. Cagan has been described by The New York Times as one of the "grandes dames of the country's progressive movement" and a "national figure in the antiwar movement."

During the late 1960s–early 1970s, Cagan was actively involved with the Black Panther Party. She has protested the conviction and incarceration of Mumia Abu-Jamal, a Black Panther Party member who was sentenced to death for the 1981 murder of police officer Daniel Faulkner.

Cagan was a lead organizer of the massive anti-nuclear rally held in New York City's Central Park on June 12, 1982, in which one million people turned out to protest the revival of the nuclear arms race under President Ronald Reagan. In 1987, she was co-chair of the Second National March on Washington for Lesbian and Gay Rights.

In 1991–92, Cagan co-founded the Committees of Correspondence for Democracy and Socialism, a socialist group that left the Communist Party following the dissolution of the Soviet Union. In 1997, she was an organizer for the 14th annual World Festival of Youth and Students.

In the mid-1990s and early 2000s, Cagan served on the national board of directors of Pacifica Radio (representing Pacifica's New York station, WBAI), including a brief term in the late 1990s as the interim board chair.

In 2002, Cagan was among the founders of United for Peace and Justice, a left-wing coalition of more than 1,300 international and U.S.-based organizations opposed to what they described as "our government's policy of permanent warfare and empire-building." The organization was founded in the months preceding the 2003 invasion of Iraq. An opponent of military intervention, Cagan was strongly opposed to U.S. military forces staying in Iraq. Her view of Iraqi insurgents fighting U.S.-led coalition forces: "What I do think is legitimate is that people who are being occupied would find a way to work against that occupation. If you call that an insurgency, then so be it." In regards to U.S. relations with Israel, Cagan had described U.S. funds as going "to help maintain the deadly Israeli occupation of Palestinian territories."

Cagan was a member of the New York Committee to Free the Cuban Five, an advocacy group seeking the release of five Cubans convicted in 2001 of spying on Cuban American exiles and U.S. military bases for Fidel Castro. In reference to peace activism, Cagan has said, "We have so much to learn from the history of the Communist Party about how this work has been done."

In 2004, Cagan was included in Out magazine's annual list of the 100 most influential LGBT people.

== Personal life ==
Cagan lives in Brooklyn, New York, with her partner, author and activist Melanie Kaye/Kantrowitz (d. 2018), founding director of Jews for Racial & Economic Justice.

== Works ==
- Phillips, Lynn; Falk, Gay; Fruchter, Rachel; Cagan, Leslie (1970). Birth Control and Abortion: Some Things to Worry About. St. Louis: Lynn Phillips. OCLC 77562805.
- Albert, Michael; Dellinger, David; Chomsky, Noam; Rayman, Paula; Cockburn, Alex; Ridgeway, James; Cagan, Leslie; O'Dell, Jack; Sklar, Holly (1983). Beyond Survival: New Directions for the Disarmament Movement. Boston: South End Press. ISBN 978-0-89608-175-8.
- Albert, Michael; Cagan, Leslie; Chomsky, Noam; Hahnel, Robin; King, Mel; Sargent, Lydia; Sklar, Holly (1986). Liberating Theory. Cambridge, Massachusetts: South End Press. ISBN 978-0-89608-306-6.
- Peters, Cynthia; Abraham, Nabeel; Albert, Michael; Cagan, Leslie; Carter, Sandy; Chomsky, Noam; Churchill, Ward; Enloe, Cynthia; Ensign, Tod; Farmanfarmaian; Abouali; Gordon, Rebecca; Hooglund, Eric; Hoynes, William; Jones, Rachel L.; Klare, Michael T.; Lesch, Ann M.; MacEwan, Arthur; Seagar, Joni; Sklar, Holly; Stone, Randolph N.; Stork, Joe; Warrior, Robert Allen (1992). Collateral Damage: The New World Order at Home and Abroad. Boston: South End Press. ISBN 978-0-89608-422-3.
- Cagan, Leslie (1994). Report From Cuba: Hijacked Boats, Action on the Streets, Heightening Tensions with the U.S. New York City: Cuba Information Project. OCLC 41340613.
