= Greater Iran =

Sociocultural region in West and Central Asia

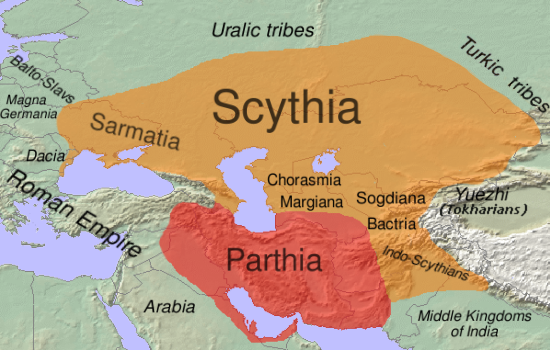
A map showing the geographic extent of ancient Iranian peoples—the Parthians and the Scythians—around 170 BC.

Greater Iran or Greater Persia (Persian: ایران بزرگ, romanized: Ērān-i Buzurg), the Iranosphere, the Persosphere or Iranzamin (Persian: ایران‌زمین, romanized: Ērān-zamīn), is a term used to refer to a broader cultural sphere that has been influenced by Iranian peoples and Iranian languages, and primarily includes the Iranian plateau, the South Caucasus, Central Asia, the Indian subcontinent (aka, South Asia), and as far east as the Tarim Basin.

The regions which make up Greater Iran are defined by having long been under the rule of various Iranian empires and dynasties, (Note: These include the Medes, Achaemenids, Parthians, Sasanians, Samanids, Saffarids, Safavids, Afsharids and Qajars.) during which the local populace gradually absorbed Iranian influence and assimilated it into their cultural and linguistic traditions; (Note: For example, those regions and peoples in the North Caucasus that were not under direct Iranian rule.) or those where a considerable Iranian population settled and retained their culture, (Note: Such as in the western parts of South Asia, Bahrain and Tajikistan.) such as in the areas surrounding the Iranian plateau. It is referred to as the "Iranian Cultural Continent" by Encyclopædia Iranica.

Throughout the 16th to 19th centuries, Iran lost many of its historical territories that had been reconquered under the Iranian dynasties of the Safavids and Qajars. The Ottoman–Persian Wars resulted in the loss of present-day Iraq to the Ottoman Empire, as outlined in the Treaty of Amasya in 1555 and the Treaty of Zuhab in 1639. Later, the Russo-Persian Wars resulted in the loss of the Caucasus to the Russian Empire: the Treaty of Gulistan in 1813 saw Iran cede present-day Dagestan, Georgia, and most of Azerbaijan; the Treaty of Turkmenchay in 1828 saw Iran cede present-day Armenia, the remainder of Azerbaijan, and Iğdır, setting the northern boundary of Iran along the Aras River. Parts of Iran, notably Herat, were lost to Afghanistan through the Treaty of Paris in 1857 and the McMahon Arbitration in 1905.

== Etymology ==
The name "Iran" is the New Persian continuation of the old genitive plural aryānām (Proto-Iranian, meaning "of the Aryans"), first attested in the Avesta as airyānąm (the text of which is composed in Avestan, an old Iranian language spoken in northeastern Greater Iran, or in what are now Afghanistan, Uzbekistan, Turkmenistan and Tajikistan).

The proto-Iranian term aryānām is present in the term Airyana Vaēǰah, the homeland of Zoroaster and Zoroastrianism, near the provinces of Sogdiana, Margiana, Bactria, etc., listed in the first chapter of the Vidēvdād. The Avestan evidence is confirmed by Greek sources: Arianē is spoken of as being between Persia and the Indian subcontinent.

However, this is a Greek pronunciation of the name Haroyum/Haraiva (Herat), which the Greeks called 'Aria' (a land listed separately from the homeland of the Aryans).

While up until the end of the Parthian period in the 3rd century CE, the idea of "Ērān" had an ethnic, linguistic, and religious value, it did not yet have a political import. The idea of an "Iranian" empire or kingdom in a political sense is a purely Sasanian one. It was the result of a convergence of interests between the new dynasty and the Zoroastrian clergy, as we can deduce from the available evidence.

This convergence gave rise to the idea of an Ērānšahr "Kingdom of the Iranians", which was "ēr" (Middle Persian, and even New Persian equivalent of Old Persian "ariya" and Avestan "airya").

== Definition ==
Richard Nelson Frye defines Greater Iran as including "much of the Caucasus, Iraq, Afghanistan, Pakistan and Central Asia, with cultural influences extending to western China and northern, northwestern, and western India." According to him, "Iran means all lands and peoples where Iranian languages were and are spoken, and where in the past, multi-faceted Iranian cultures existed."

Richard Foltz describes the Greater Iran as a cultural area stretching from Mesopotamia and the Caucasus into Khwarizm, Transoxiana, Bactria, and the Pamirs, including in pre-Islamic times peoples such as the Persians, Medes, Parthians, and Sogdians, among others.

Medieval and early modern Persian authors, such as Qadi Baydawi, 'Abd al-Razzāq Samarqandī, Mir Khwand, and Mustawfī-e Bāfqī, typically defined Iran as extending from the Euphrates to the Oxus. The Shahnameh of Abu Mansur describes Iran as a land stretching from the Oxus to the Nile (or the Euphrates in some readings), situated at the center of the world, surrounded by China, India, the Turks, the Khazars, the 'Barbarians,' Rome, and Egypt. In the Letter of Tansar, as quoted by Ibn Isfandiyar, Iran is described as stretching from the Oxus to the furthermost borders of Azerbaijan and Persarmenia, and from the Euphrates and "the lands of the Arabs" up to Oman and Makran, and from thence to Kabul and Tokharistan. Hamdallah Mustawfi defines Iran's geography in his Nuzhat al-Qulūb as extending from Konya in the west to the Oxus in the east, and from Basra in the south to Derbent in the north. He proceeds to elaborate on Iran's exact geographic boundaries as follows:

Sind, Kabul, Saghaniyan, Transoxiana, and Khwarizm up to Saqsin and Bulghār, make up Iran's eastern frontiers. Niksar and Sis make up the western frontiers. Ossetia, Circassia, Alania, Rus, and the lands of the Magyars and the Burtas along the Khazar steppe, make up the northern frontiers. ... The Najd desert—connected to Syria in the west and the sea of Persia in the east—marks the southern frontier. Although some of these borderlands have been under the rule of the kings of Iran in the past—some of the cities therein having even been founded by Iranian kings—we shall not mention any more of them, for our intent here is only to describe the land of Iran.

== Background ==
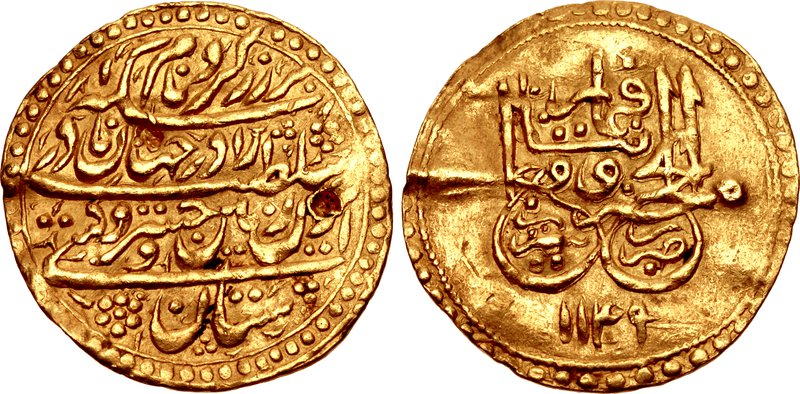
An Ashrafi Coin of Nader Shah (r. 1736–1747), reverse: "Coined on gold the word of kingdom in the world, Nader of Greater Iran and the world-conqueror king."

Greater Iran is called Eranzamin (ایران‌زمین) which means "Iranland" or "The Land of Iran". Eranzamin was in the mythical times as opposed to the Turanzamin, "Turanland" or "The Land of Turan", which was located in the upper part of Central Asia.

With Imperial Russia continuously advancing south in the course of two wars against Persia, and the treaties of Turkmenchay and Gulistan in the western frontiers, plus the unexpected death of Abbas Mirza in 1833, and the murdering of Persia's Grand Vizier (Mirza AbolQasem Qa'im Maqām), many Central Asian khanates began losing hope for any support from Persia against the Tsarist armies. The Russian armies occupied the Aral coast in 1849, Tashkent in 1864, Bukhara in 1867, Samarkand in 1868, and Khiva and Amudarya in 1873.

Many Iranians consider their natural sphere of influence to extend beyond Iran's present borders. After all, Iran was once much larger. Portuguese forces seized islands and ports in the 16th and 17th centuries. In the 19th century, the Russian Empire wrested from Tehran's control what is today Armenia, Republic of Azerbaijan, and part of Georgia. Iranian elementary school texts teach about the Iranian roots not only of cities like Baku, but also cities further north like Derbent in southern Russia. The Shah lost much of his claim to western Afghanistan following the Anglo-Iranian war of 1856–1857. Only in 1970 did a UN sponsored consultation end Iranian claims to suzerainty over the Persian Gulf island nation of Bahrain. In centuries past, Iranian rule once stretched westward into modern Iraq and beyond. When the western world complains of Iranian interference beyond its borders, the Iranian government often convinced itself that it is merely exerting its influence in lands that were once its own. Simultaneously, Iran's losses at the hands of outside powers have contributed to a sense of grievance that continues to the present day.

—Patrick Clawson of the Washington Institute for Near East Policy

Iran today is just a rump of what it once was. At its height, Iranian rulers controlled Iraq, Afghanistan, Western Pakistan, much of Central Asia, and the Caucasus. Many Iranians today consider these areas part of a greater Iranian sphere of influence.

—Patrick Clawson

Since the days of the Achaemenids, the Iranians had the protection of geography. But high mountains and the vast emptiness of the Iranian plateau were no longer enough to shield Iran from the Russian army or British navy. Both literally, and figuratively, Iran shrank. At the beginning of the nineteenth century, Azerbaijan, Armenia, and Afghanistan were Iranian, but by the end of the century, all this territory had been lost as a result of European military action.

== Regions ==
In the 8th century, Iran was conquered by the Arab Abbasids who ruled from Baghdad. The territory of Iran at that time was composed of two portions: Persian Iraq (western portion) and Khorasan (eastern portion). The dividing region was mostly the cities of Gurgan and Damaghan. The Ghaznavids, Seljuqs and Timurids divided their empires into Iraqi and Khorasani regions. This point can be observed in many books such as Abul Fazl Bayhqi's "Tārīkh-i Bayhaqī", Al-Ghazali's Faza'il al-anam min rasa'ili hujjat al-Islam and other books. Transoxiana and Chorasmia were mostly included in the Khorasanian region.

=== Caucasus ===
==== North Caucasus ====
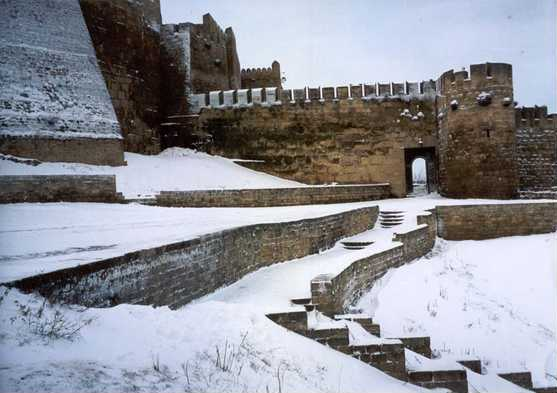
Sassanian fortress in Derbent, Dagestan, which has been inscribed on Russia's UNESCO world heritage list since 2003.

Dagestan remains the bastion of Persian culture in the North Caucasus with fine examples of Iranian architecture like the Sassanid citadel in Derbent, the strong influence of Persian cuisine, and common Persian names amongst the ethnic peoples of Dagestan. The ethnic Persian population of the North Caucasus, the Tats, remain, despite strong assimilation over the years, still visible in several North Caucasian cities. Even today, after decades of partition, some of these regions retain Iranian influences, as seen in their old beliefs, traditions and customs (e.g. Norouz).

==== South Caucasus ====
According to Tadeusz Swietochowski, the territories of Iran and the republic of Azerbaijan usually shared the same history from the time of ancient Media (ninth to seventh centuries b.c.) and the Persian Empire (sixth to fourth centuries b.c.).

Intimately and inseparably intertwined histories for millennia, Iran irrevocably lost the territory that is nowadays Azerbaijan in the course of the 19th century. With the Treaty of Gulistan of 1813 following the Russo-Persian War (1804–1813) Iran had to cede eastern Georgia, its possessions in the North Caucasus and many of those in what is today the Azerbaijan Republic, which included the khanates of Baku, Shirvan, Karabakh, Ganja, Shaki, Quba, Derbent, and parts of Talysh. These Khanates comprise most of what is today the Republic of Azerbaijan and Dagestan in Southern Russia. In the Treaty of Turkmenchay of 1828 following the Russo-Persian War (1826–1828), the result was even more disastrous, and resulted in Iran being forced to cede the remainder of the Talysh Khanate, the khanates of Nakhichevan and Erivan, and the Mughan region to Russia. All these territories together, lost in 1813 and 1828 combined, constitute all of the modern-day Republic of Azerbaijan, Armenia, and southern Dagestan. The area to the north of the river Aras, which includes the territory of the contemporary republic of Azerbaijan, was Iranian territory until it was occupied by Russia in the course of the 19th century.

Many localities in this region bear Persian names or names derived from Iranian languages and Azerbaijan remains by far Iran's closest cultural, religious, ethnic, and historical neighbor. Azerbaijanis are by far the second-largest ethnicity in Iran, and comprise the largest community of ethnic Azerbaijanis in the world, vastly outnumbering the number in the Republic of Azerbaijan. Both nations are the only officially Shia majority in the world, with adherents of the religion comprising an absolute majority in both nations. The people of nowadays Iran and Azerbaijan were converted to Shiism during exactly the same time in history. Furthermore, the name of "Azerbaijan" is derived through the name of the Persian satrap which ruled the contemporary region of Iranian Azerbaijan and minor parts of the Republic of Azerbaijan in ancient times.

=== Central Asia ===
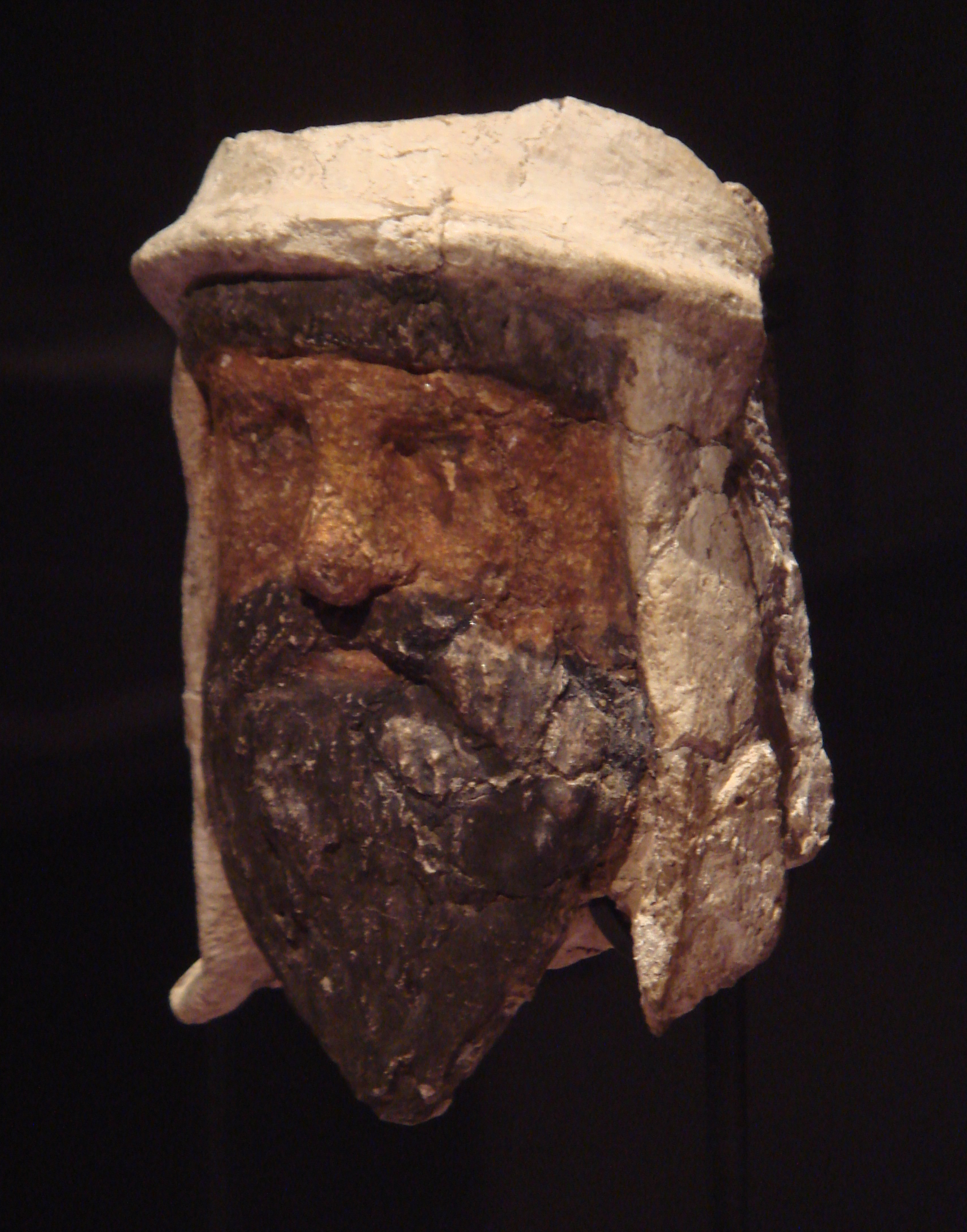
Painted clay and alabaster head of a Zoroastrian priest wearing a distinctive Bactrian-style headdress, Takhti-Sangin, Tajikistan, Greco-Bactrian kingdom, 3rd-2nd century BCE.

Khwarazm is one of the regions of Iran-zameen, and is the home of the ancient Iranians, Airyanem Vaejah, according to the ancient book of the Avesta. Modern scholars believe Khwarazm to be what ancient Avestic texts refer to as "Ariyaneh Waeje" or Īrānvīj. These sources claim that Urgandj, which was the capital of ancient Khwarazm for many years, was actually "Ourva": the eighth land of Ahura Mazda mentioned in the Pahlavi text of Vendidad. Others such as University of Hawaii historian Elton L. Daniel believe Khwarazm to be the "most likely locale" corresponding to the original home of the Avestan people, while Dehkhoda calls Khwarazm "the cradle of the Aryan people" (مهد قوم آریا). Today Khwarazm is split between several central Asian republics.

Superimposed on and overlapping with Chorasmia was Khorasan which roughly covered nearly the same geographical areas in Central Asia (starting from Semnan eastward through northern Afghanistan roughly until the foothills of Pamir, ancient Mount Imeon). Current day provinces such as Sanjan in Turkmenia, Razavi Khorasan Province, North Khorasan Province, and Southern Khorasan Province in Iran are all remnants of the old Khorasan. Until the 13th century and the devastating Mongol invasion of the region, Khorasan was considered the cultural capital of Greater Iran.

=== China ===
==== Xinjiang ====
The Tashkurgan Tajik Autonomous County regions of China harbored a Tajik population and culture. Chinese Tashkurgan Tajik Autonomous County was always counted as a part of the Iranian cultural and linguistic continent with Kashgar, Yarkand, and Hotan bound to the Iranian history.

=== West Asia ===
==== Bahrain ====
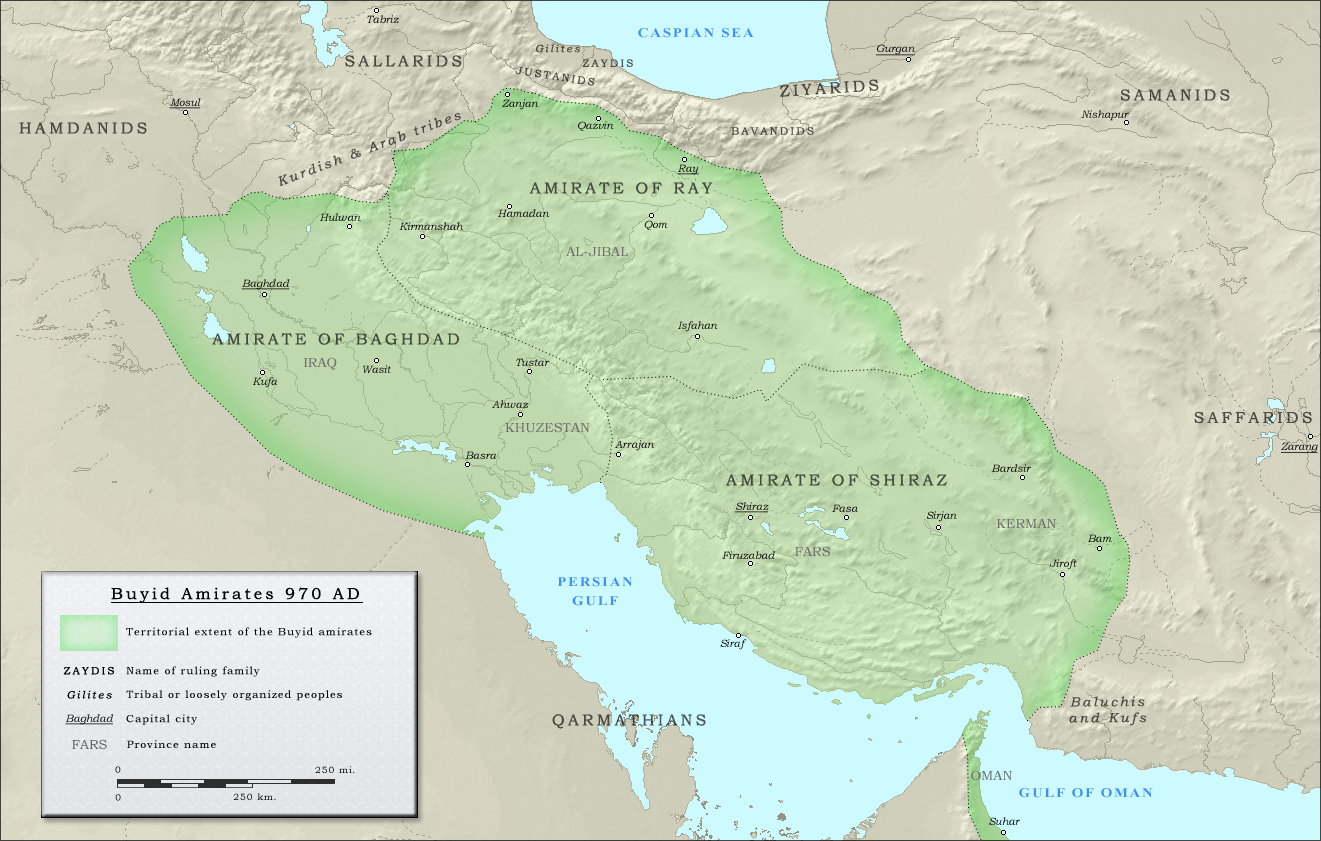
Buyid dynasty

From the 6th century BC to the 3rd century BC, Bahrain was a prominent part of the Persian Empire under the Achaemenid dynasty. It was referred to by the Greeks as "Tylos", the centre of pearl trading, when Nearchus discovered it while serving under Alexander the Great. From the 3rd century BC to the arrival of Islam in the 7th century AD, the island was controlled by two other Iranian dynasties, the Parthians and the Sassanids.

In the 3rd century AD, the Sassanids succeeded the Parthians and controlled the area for four centuries until the Arab conquest. Ardashir, the first ruler of the Iranian Sassanid dynasty marched to Oman and Bahrain and defeated Sanatruq (or Satiran), probably the Parthian governor of Bahrain. He appointed his son Shapur I as governor. Shapur constructed a new city there and named it Batan Ardashir after his father. At this time, it incorporated the southern Sassanid province covering the Persian Gulf's southern shore plus the archipelago of Bahrain. The southern province of the Sassanids was subdivided into three districts; Haggar (now al-Hafuf province, Saudi Arabia), Batan Ardashir (now al-Qatif province, Saudi Arabia), and Mishmahig (now Bahrain Island) (In Middle-Persian/Pahlavi it means "ewe-fish").

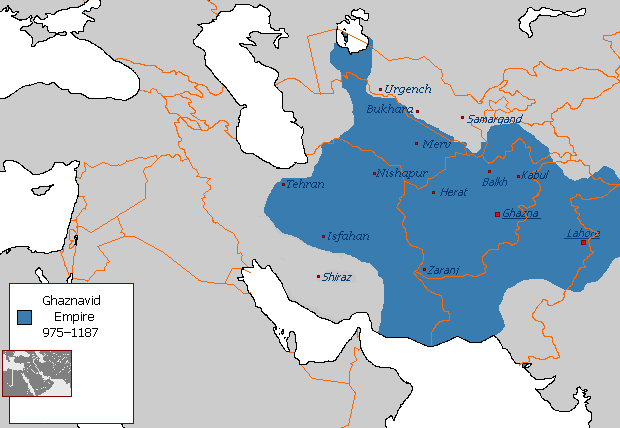
Ghaznavids at their greatest extent

By about 130 BC, the Parthian dynasty brought the Persian Gulf under their control and extended their influence as far as Oman. Because they needed to control the Persian Gulf trade route, the Parthians established garrisons along the southern coast of the Persian Gulf. through warfare and economic distress, been reduced to only 60. The influence of Iran was further undermined at the end of the 18th century when the ideological power struggle between the Akhbari-Usuli strands culminated in victory for the Usulis in Bahrain.

An Afghan uprising led by Hotakis of Kandahar at the beginning of the 18th century resulted in the near-collapse of the Safavid state. In the resultant power vacuum, Oman invaded Bahrain in 1717, ending over one hundred years of Persian hegemony in Bahrain. The Omani invasion began a period of political instability and a quick succession of outside rulers took power with consequent destruction. According to a contemporary account by theologian, Sheikh Yusuf Al Bahrani, in an unsuccessful attempt by the Persians and their Bedouin allies to take back Bahrain from the Kharijite Omanis, much of the country was burnt to the ground. Bahrain was eventually sold back to the Persians by the Omanis, but the weakness of the Safavid empire saw Huwala tribes seize control.

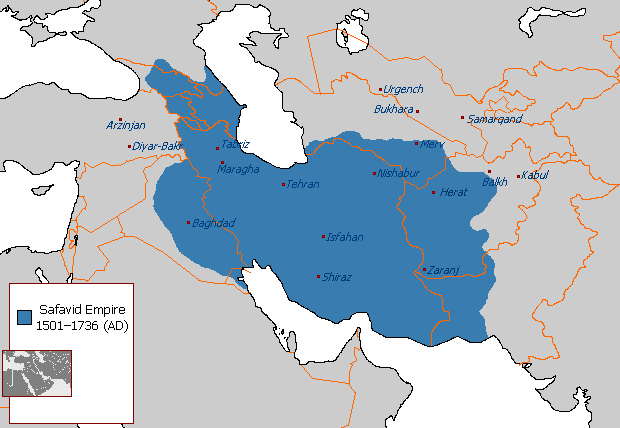
The Safavid Empire under Shah Abbas the Great

In 1730, the new Shah of Persia, Nadir Shah, sought to re-assert Persian sovereignty in Bahrain. He ordered Latif Khan, the admiral of the Persian navy in the Persian Gulf, to prepare an invasion fleet in Bushehr. The Persians invaded in March or early April 1736 when the ruler of Bahrain, Shaikh Jubayr, was away on hajj. The invasion brought the island back under central rule and to challenge Oman in the Persian Gulf. He sought help from the British and Dutch, and he eventually recaptured Bahrain in 1736. During the Qajar era, Persian control over Bahrain waned and in 1753, Bahrain was occupied by the Sunni Persians of the Bushire-based Al Madhkur family, who ruled Bahrain in the name of Persia and paid allegiance to Karim Khan Zand.

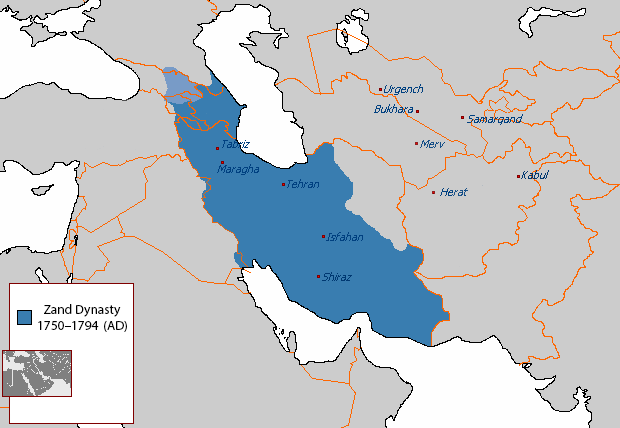
Zand dynasty at its greatest extent

During most of the second half of the eighteenth century, Bahrain was ruled by Nasr Al-Madhkur, the ruler of Bushehr. The Bani Utibah tribe from Zubarah exceeded in taking over Bahrain after war broke out in 1782. Persian attempts to reconquer the island in 1783 and in 1785 failed; the 1783 expedition was a joint Persian-Qawasim invasion force that never left Bushehr. The 1785 invasion fleet, composed of forces from Bushehr, Rig, and Shiraz was called off after the death of the ruler of Shiraz, Ali Murad Khan. Due to internal difficulties, the Persians could not attempt another invasion. In 1799, Bahrain came under threat from the expansionist policies of Sayyid Sultan, the Sultan of Oman, when he invaded the island under the pretext that Bahrain did not pay taxes owed. The Bani Utbah solicited the aid of Bushire to expel the Omanis on the condition that Bahrain would become a tributary state of Persia. In 1800, Sayyid Sultan invaded Bahrain again in retaliation and deployed a garrison at Arad Fort, in Muharraq island and had appointed his twelve-year-old son Salim, as Governor of the island.

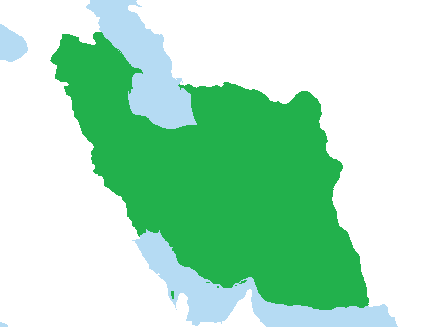
Qajar dynasty at its greatest extent

Many names of villages in Bahrain are derived from the Persian language. These names were thought to have been as a result influences during the Safavid rule of Bahrain (1501–1722) and previous Persian rule. Village names such as Karbabad, Salmabad, Karzakan, Duraz, Barbar were originally derived from the Persian language, suggesting that Persians had a substantial effect on the island's history. The local Bahrani Arabic dialect has also borrowed many words from the Persian language. Bahrain's capital city, Manama is derived from two Persian words meaning 'I' and 'speech'.

In 1910, the Persian community funded and opened a private school, Al-Ittihad school, that taught Farsi amongst other subjects. According to the 1905 census, there were 1650 Bahraini citizens of Persian origin.

Historian Nasser Hussain says that many Iranians fled their native country in the early 20th century due to a law king Reza Shah issued which banned women from wearing the hijab, or because they feared for their lives after fighting the English or to find jobs. They were coming to Bahrain from Bushehr and the Fars province between 1920 and 1940. In the 1920s, local Persian merchants were prominently involved in the consolidation of Bahrain's first powerful lobby with connections to the municipality in an effort to contest the municipal legislation of British control.

The Shah of Iran at the time, more or less dismissed Bahrain due to what he perceived to be its "Arab Identity", At 12:50 p.m. on March 26, 1970, the London Radio announced that both Britain and Imperialist Iran had submitted a request to the Secretary-General of the United Nations to send a representative from the international organization to survey the opinion of the people of Bahrain as to whether they wish to "remain under British Protectorate or to have Independence or be part of Iran." This concluded with the independence of Bahrain and the officialization of the monarchist rule of the Al-Khalifa family, ruling Bahrain til present day.

Bahrain's local Persian community has heavily influenced the country's local food dishes. One of the most notable local delicacies of the people in Bahrain is mahyawa, which is consumed in Southern Iran as well. It is a watery, earth-brick-coloured sauce made from sardines, and consumed with bread or other food. Bahrain's Persians are also famous in Bahrain for bread-making. Another local delicacy is pishoo made from rose water (golab) and agar agar. Other food items consumed are similar to Persian cuisine.

==== Iraq ====
Throughout history, Iran always had strong cultural ties with the region of present-day Iraq. Mesopotamia is considered the cradle of civilization and the place where the first empires in history were established. These empires, namely the Sumerian, Akkadian, Babylonian, and Assyrian, dominated the ancient Middle East for millennia, which explains the great influence of Mesopotamia on the Iranian culture and history, and it is also the reason why the later Iranian and Greek dynasties chose Mesopotamia to be the political center of their rule. For a period of around 500 years, what is now Iraq formed the core of Iran, with the Iranian Parthian and Sasanian empires having their capital in what is modern-day Iraq for the same centuries-long time span. (Ctesiphon)

Of the four residences of the Achaemenids named by Herodotus—Ecbatana, Pasargadae or Persepolis, Susa and Babylon—the last [situated in Iraq] was maintained as their most important capital, the fixed winter quarters, the central office of bureaucracy, exchanged only in the heat of summer for some cool spot in the highlands. Under the Seleucids and the Parthians the site of the Mesopotamian capital moved a little to the north on the Tigris—to Seleucia and Ctesiphon. It is indeed symbolic that these new foundations were built from the bricks of ancient Babylon, just as later Baghdad, a little further upstream, was built out of the ruins of the Sassanian double city of Seleucia-Ctesiphon.

— Iranologist Ehsan Yarshater, The Cambridge History of Iran,

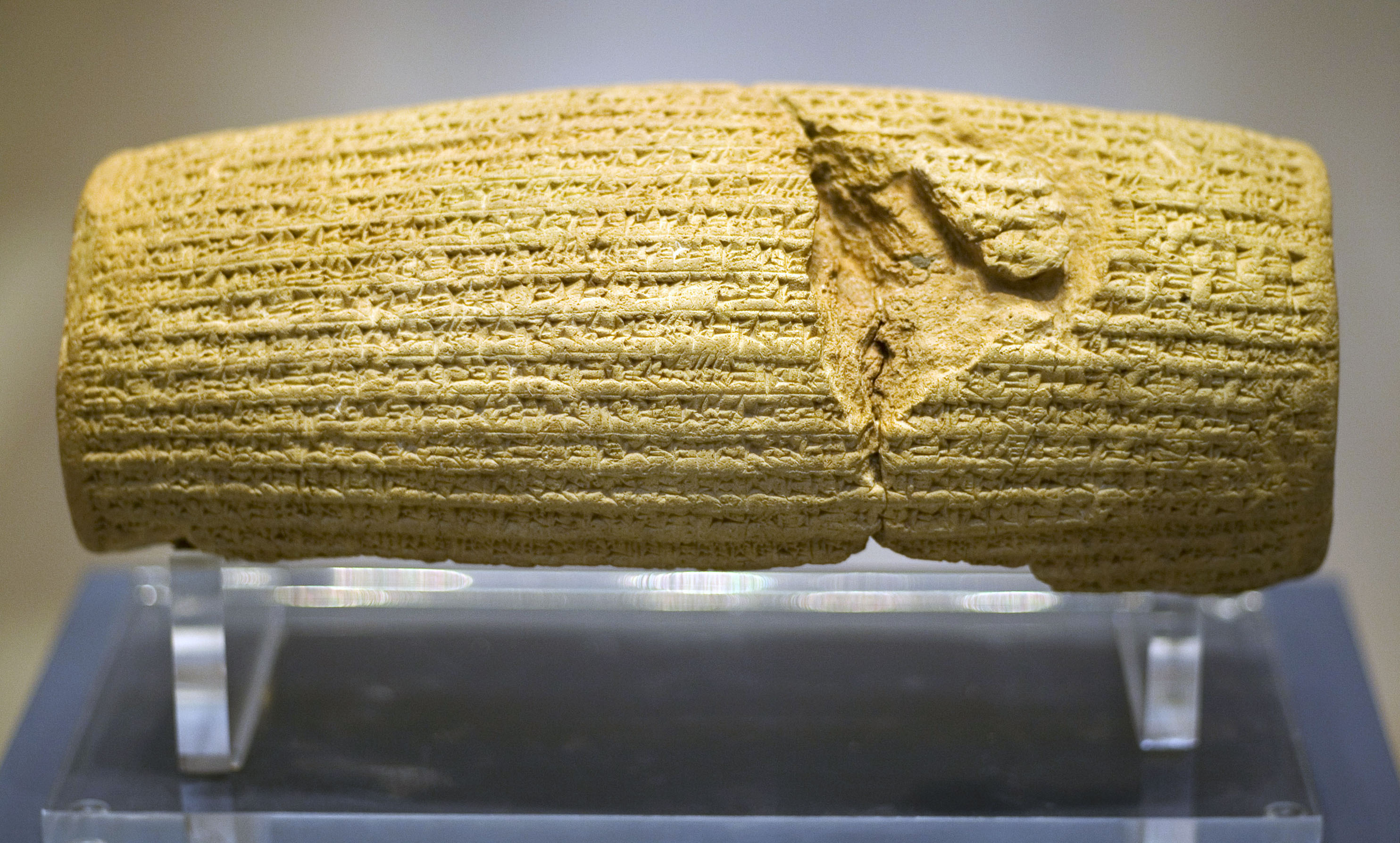
The Cyrus Cylinder, written in Babylonian cuneiform in the name of the Achaemenid king, Cyrus the Great, describes the Persian takeover of Babylon (An ancient city in modern-day Iraq).

According to Iranologist Richard N. Frye:

Throughout Iran's history the western part of the land has been frequently more closely connected with the lowlands of Mesopotamia (Iraq) than with the rest of the plateau to the east of the central deserts [the Dasht-e Kavir and Dasht-e Lut].

— Richard N. Frye, The Golden Age of Persia: The Arabs in the East

Between the coming of the Abbasids [in 750] and the Mongol onslaught [in 1258], Iraq and western Iran shared a closer history than did eastern Iran and its western counterpart.

— Neguin Yavari, Iranian Perspectives on the Iran–Iraq War

Testimony to the close relationship shared by Iraq and western Iran during the Abbasid era and later centuries, is the fact that the two regions came to share the same name. The western region of Iran (ancient Media) was called 'Irāq-e 'Ajamī ("Persian Iraq"), while central-southern Iraq (Babylonia) was called 'Irāq al-'Arabī ("Arabic Iraq") or Bābil ("Babylon").

For centuries the two neighbouring regions were known as "The Two Iraqs" ("al-'Iraqain"). The 12th century Persian poet Khāqāni wrote a famous poem Tohfat-ul Iraqein ("The Gift of the Two Iraqs"). The city of Arāk in western Iran still bears the region's old name, and Iranians still traditionally call the region between Tehran, Isfahan and Īlām "ʿErāq".

During the medieval ages, Mesopotamian and Iranian peoples knew each other's languages because of trade, and because Arabic was the language of religion and science at that time. The Timurid historian Ḥāfeẓ-e Abru (d. 1430) wrote of Iraq:

The majority of inhabitants of Iraq know Persian and Arabic, and from the time of the domination of Turkic people the Turkish language has also found currency.

— Ḥāfeẓ-e Abru

Iraqis share religious and certain cultural ties with Iranians. The majority of Iranians are Twelver Shia (an Islamic sect).

Iraqi culture has commonalities with the culture of Iran. The Mesopotamian cuisine also has similarities to the Persian cuisine, including common dishes and cooking techniques. The Iraqi dialect has absorbed many words from the Persian language.

== See also ==
- -stan
- Azerbaijani language
- Culture of Azerbaijan
- Culture of Iran
- Greater Armenia
- Greater Central Asia
- Greater Khorasan
- History of the Kurdish people
- Indo-Persian culture
- Iranian peoples
- Iranian studies
- Kurdish culture
- Kurdish language
- List of Persia-related topics
- Old Azeri language
- Pan-Iranism
- Persianate society
- Persianization
- Turco-Persian tradition

== Notes and references ==
=== General references ===
- Fisher, William Bayne; Avery, P.; Hambly, G. R. G; Melville, C. (1991). The Cambridge History of Iran. Vol. 7. Cambridge: Cambridge University Press. ISBN 978-0-521-20095-0.
- Foltz, Richard (2015). Iran in World History. New York: Oxford University Press. ISBN 978-0-19-933549-7.
- Marcinkowski, Christoph (2010). Shi'ite Identities: Community and Culture in Changing Social Contexts. Berlin: Lit Verlag. ISBN 978-3-643-80049-7.
