= Service worker =

Service worker may refer to:

- Social service worker, a person engaged in social work
- Pink-collar worker, a person in the service industry whose labour is related to customer interaction, entertainment, sales or other service-oriented work
- Service worker, a scriptable network proxy in a web browser that manages network requests for a webpage
