= Patrick Clawson =

American economist (born 1951)

Patrick Lyell Clawson
- Born: March 30, 1951 (age 75)
- Education: Oberlin College (B.A.); The New School for Social Research (Ph.D.)
- Occupations: Economist, Middle East scholar

Patrick Lyell Clawson (born March 30, 1951) is an American economist and Middle East scholar. He is currently the Director for Research at The Washington Institute for Near East Policy and senior editor of Middle East Quarterly.

== Biography ==
Born in Alexandria, Virginia, Clawson graduated with a B.A. from Oberlin College in 1973 and earned a Ph.D. from The New School for Social Research in 1978. He taught at Seton Hall University from 1979 to 1981 and served as a senior economist for the International Monetary Fund from 1981 until 1985, when he took a position as a senior economist with the World Bank.

Clawson has published many articles on the Middle East in Foreign Affairs, International Economy, Orbis, Oxford Bulletin of Economics and Statistics and Middle East Journal. He has additionally published opinion pieces in The New York Times, Wall Street Journal, and Washington Post. Clawson was co-convenor of the Presidential Study Group organized by The Washington Institute. The group published its recommendations to the new Bush administration in the form of a monograph, Navigating Through Turbulence: America and the Middle East in a New Century, published by The Washington Institute in 2001.

Clawson drew criticism for a presentation on September 21, 2012, in which he suggested the United States could consider the use of "crisis initiation" as a method of provoking Iran into war. This was part of a presentation given with Dennis Ross and David Makovsky at The Washington Institute for Near East Policy entitled How to Build U.S.-Israeli Coordination on Preventing an Iranian Nuclear Breakout.

== Media ==
Clawson first appeared on C-SPAN in a 1990 Forum as a Research Scholar for the Foreign Policy Research Institute, and has since appeared upwards of two dozen times.

== Selected works ==
Books

- The Andean Cocaine Industry, with Rensselaer W. Lee III. St. Martin's Press, August 1996. ISBN 978-0312124007.
- Checking Iran's Nuclear Ambitions, with Henry D. Sokolski. Strategic Studies Institute, 2004. ISBN 1584871490.
- Eternal Iran: Continuity and Chaos, with Michael Rubin. Palgrave Macmillan, 2005. ISBN 1403962766.
- The Monetary History of Iran: From the Safavids to the Qajars, with Rudi Matthee & Willem Floor. London: I.B. Tauris, 2013. ISBN 978-1780760797.

Books edited

- Getting Ready for a Nuclear-Ready Iran, with Henry D. Sokolski. Carlisle, Pennsylvania: Strategic Studies Institute, U.S. Army War College, October 2005. ISBN 158487211X. JSTOR resrep12040.

Contributed works

- "'Guided Markets': Carter's Energy Plan and the Restructuring of U.S. Capital," with Allen Kaufman. Trilateralism: The Trilateral Commission and Elite Planning for World Management, edited by Holly Sklar. Boston: South End Press, 1980, pp. 324–338.
- "U.S. Sanctions." The Iran Primer. Woodrow Wilson International Center for Scholars, 2010.

Reports

- Iran's Strategic Intentions and Capabilities. Washington, D.C.: Institute for National Strategic Studies, April 1994.

Articles and essays

- "Ambitious Iran, Troubled Neighbors," with Daniel Pipes. Foreign Affairs, Vol. 72, No. 1, January 1, 1992.
- "How to Eliminate Iran's Nuclear Weapons." Claremont Review of Books, Vol. 6, No. 2, Spring 2006.
- "Saving the Neocons," with Stephen Wrage, Peter Abbott, Flynt Leverett and Joshua Muravchik. Foreign Policy, No. 158, January–February 2007, pp. 6, 8, 10, 12.
- "The 8 Books Ahmadinejad Doesn't Want You to Read." Foreign Policy, June 24, 2009.
- "No Nixon-to-China Moment Here." Foreign Policy, October 1, 2009.
- "How Much Brinksmanship Will Israel Tolerate?" The Atlantic, August 16, 2010.
- "The U.S. and Israel: Same View of Threat, Different View on Force." The Atlantic, August 20, 2010.
- "Sanctions Are Only a Stop-Gap." Foreign Affairs, May 8, 2012.
- "Don't Throw Iran's Democrat's Under the Bus." Foreign Policy, April 13, 2012.
- "Will Iran Weather the Economic Storm?" Foreign Policy, October 11, 2012.
- "Obama, Offer Iran a Generous Deal." The Atlantic, January 16, 2013.
- "Iran Can't Agree to a Damn Thing." Foreign Policy, February 20, 2013.
- "Stalemate's End?" Foreign Policy, September 19, 2013.
- "Talk is Cheap." Foreign Affairs, September 24, 2013.

== See also ==
- Iranistics
- Middle East Quarterly
- US-Iran relations
- Washington Institute for Near East Policy
