= A. B. Magil =

American Marxist journalist (1905–2003)

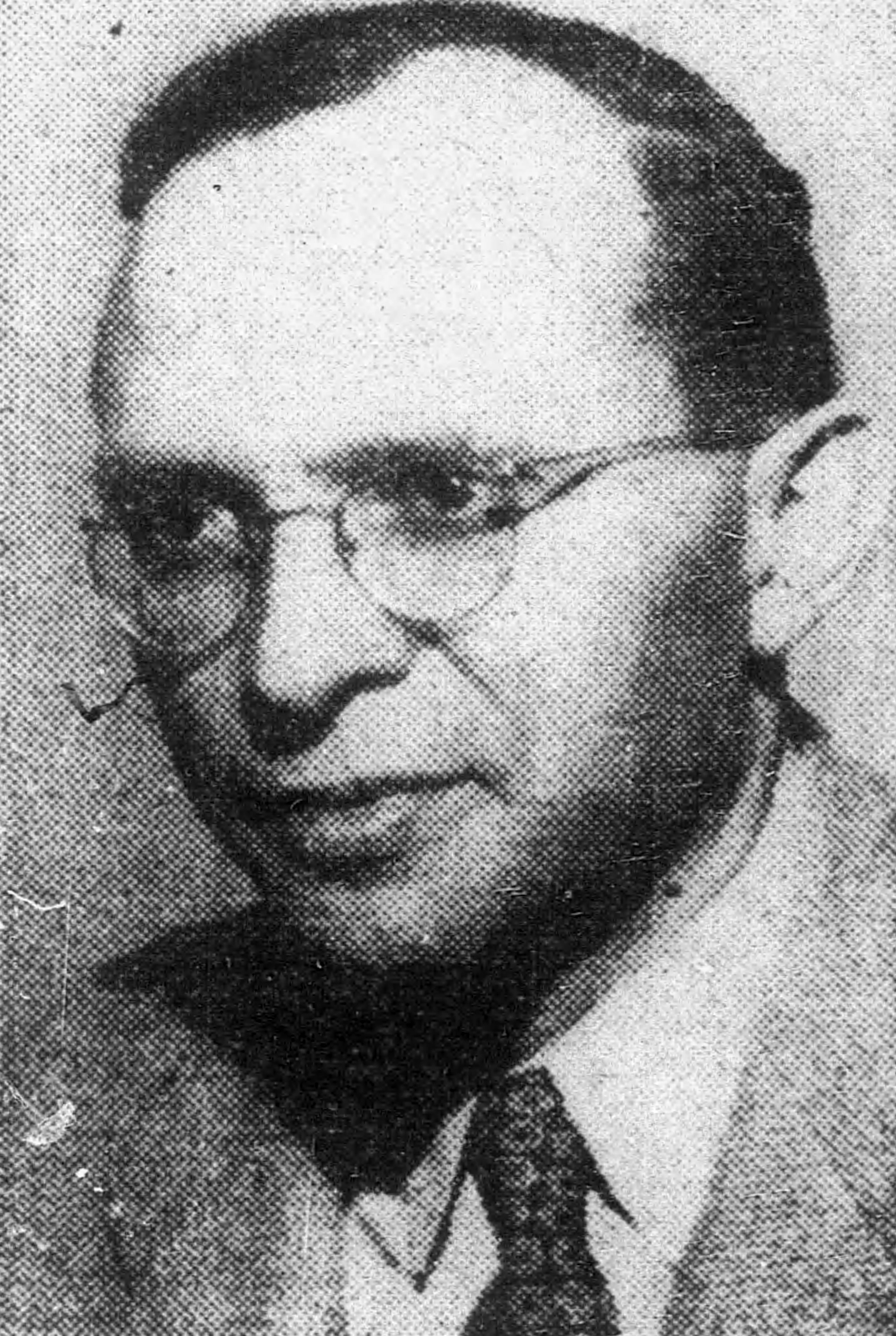
- Magil c. 1957
- Born: 1905; Philadelphia, Pennsylvania, U.S.
- Died: January 2003 (aged 97–98)
- Employer: Daily Worker
- Political party: Communist Party USA
- Writing career
- Spouse: Harriet Black
- Children: 1 daughter
- Relatives: Willi Wolff (by marriage)
- Years active: 1926–2003
- Genre: Marxist pamphlets
- Notable work: "Socialism – What’s In It for You?” (1946)

Abraham Bernard "Abe" Magil (1905 – January 2003), better known as A. B. Magil, was a "Marxist journalist and pamphleteer."

== Background ==
Abraham Bernard Magil was born in 1905 in South Philadelphia, Pennsylvania, to a poor, Jewish, immigrant family. He had three older sisters. He won a scholarship to attend the University of Pennsylvania, where he obtained a degree in journalism and was a Phi Beta Kappa Key.

== Career ==
=== Daily Worker (1926–1958) ===
In 1926, after graduating, Magil moved to New York City, where he joined the Communist Party (CPUSA) and went on staff at the Daily Worker, the Party's newspaper. In 1927, Whittaker Chambers came to know Magil at the Daily Worker through their common friends, Harry Freeman and Sender Garlin.

In 1930, he traveled to Russia for the World Congress of Revolutionary Artists and Writers and returned through Berlin.

During the Great Depression, the Party sent Magil to Detroit (1933–35) to found a state-wide edition of the Daily Worker. The local edition soon ran out of money, so Magil started to edit the Auto News for the Auto Workers Union, a left-led predecessor of the United Auto Workers. What that newspaper also ran out of money, Magil became local correspondent for the Daily Worker.

During the 1930s and into the 1940s, he worked alongside Joe North at the head of the New Masses. He wrote a poem on the death of Soviet poet Mayakovsky, which appeared along with other poetry in the 1938 Anthology of Proletarian Literature in the United States, edited by Granville Hicks. By 1948, when the magazine closed, he became the magazine's executive editor.

Magil decided to take his family to live in Palestine. After initial refusal by the State Department ("not to be in the interests of the United States") Magil obtained a passport. They lived there six months, during which time Israel declared it independence (May 5, 1948). He served as foreign correspondent for the Daily Worker and Yiddish-language Morning Frieheit. Magil's cousin there, Matja Lessem, had married Dr. Willi Wolff, Israel's first minister of health. He covered the military action of the Palmach, a left-wing, special military unit of the Haganah and interviewed its commander, Yigdal Alon (later Israeli military chief of staff) and second in command Yitzhak Rabin (later Israeli prime minister. Upon their return to New York, he wrote the book Israel in Crisis (New York: International Publishers, 1949).

During much of the 1950s (during McCarthyism), the Party asked Magil to move to Mexico with his family. Again, he worked there as foreign correspondent for the Daily Worker – and also "supplied Party leaders with information on the political situation both in the United States and in Mexico." Mexican Communists he knew included: David Siqueiros, Diego Rivera, and Frida Kahlo, as well as visitors like Pablo Neruda, Juan Marinello, Carlos Raphael Rodriguez, and Hollywood Ten refugees Albert Maltz, Ring Lardner Jr., and Dalton Trumbo.

He returned to the States at McCarthyism's peak, joined the Party's Administrative Committee, establish a National Peace Commission, and continued to write for the Daily Worker.

He interviewed Guatemala's leader Jacobo Arbenz six month's before the latter's overthrow. Returning to the States via Mexico, the FBI arrested him in Mexico illegally. Back in the States, he co-wrote the pamphlet "What Happened in Guatemala” with Helen Simon Travis.

During 1955–1956, he was an editor of the quarterly Mainstream and its monthly successor Masses & Mainstream. In 1958, he became editor of the Sunday Worker and foreign editor of the Daily Worker.

=== Later life ===
In 1958, Magil took full-time work in medical journalism. He continued Party activity as a member of the editorial board of the progressive monthly Jewish Currents and was member in a Party club of writers led by Si Gerson.

Magil left the Party with many others in 1992 in the wake of the fall of the Soviet Union and joined the Committees of Correspondence for Democracy and Socialism. In his last decade, he continued to champion the need to build democratic unity to defeat the far-right Republican Party. He also partook in a Marxist discussion group.

== Personal and death ==
Magil was known as "Abe" and Abraham.

Around 1940, Magil married Harriet Black, a psychiatric social worker who had been National Treasurer of the American Women's Congress; they were married for 62 years until Harriett’s death in 2002. They had one child, Maggie, and one granddaughter.

A.B. Magil died age 97 in January 2003.

== Works ==
Pamphlets

- "The Truth About Father Coughlin" (Workers Library, 1935)
- "The Real Father Coughlin" (1938)
- "The Battle for America: 1776–1861–1941" (New York: International Publishers, 1943)
- "Socialism – What’s In It for You?” (1946)

• "What Happened in Guatemala” with Helen Simon Travis (1954)

Books

- The Peril of Fascism: The Crisis of American Democracy with Henry Stevens (New York: International Publishers, 1938)
- Israel in Crisis (New York: International Publishers, 1949)

Articles

- Daily Worker (1926–1958)
- Auto News (1930s)
- New Masses (1930s–1948)
- Morning Frieheit (1948)

Poetry

- Poem on Mayakovsky's death
- Poetry in the 1938 Anthology of Proletarian Literature in the United States, edited by Granville Hicks

== See also ==
- Daily Worker
- Hollywood Ten
- Whittaker Chambers
