= Carl Davidson =

American philosopher

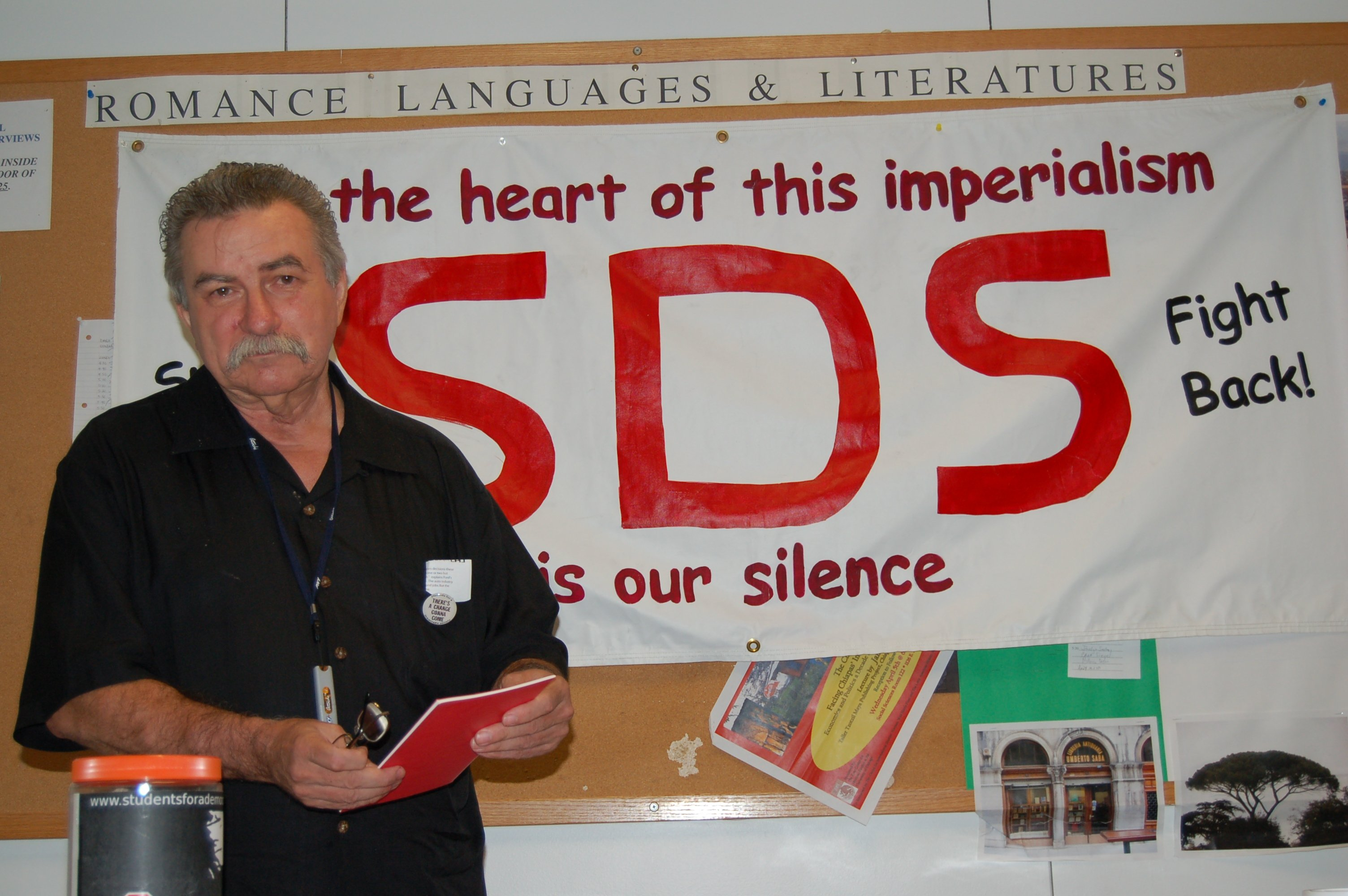
Carl Davidson at a new SDS convention, Chicago, 2006.

Carl Davidson is a former American student leader of the New Left of the 1960s, serving as a Vice President and National Secretary of Students for a Democratic Society. From 1968 to 1976, he worked on the Guardian newsweekly as a writer and news editor.

== Career ==
Born in 1943, he graduated with a B.A. in philosophy from Penn State, and later taught and did graduate work at the University of Nebraska, between 1965 and 1966.

Today he is a national co-chair of the Committees of Correspondence for Democracy and Socialism and a national board member of Solidarity Economy Network, advocating a mixture of market socialism and worker ownership. Recently Davidson led Progressives for Obama, now called Progressive America Rising, as an independent left-progressive initiative, in part to convince those on the radical left to pursue what he considers more pragmatic alternatives. He has also worked on a leadership level with United for Peace and Justice and its local affiliates. After organizing for many years in New York City and Chicago, he now resides in Beaver County, PA, near Pittsburgh, where he was born and raised.

== Published works ==
- Davidson, Carl; Harris, Jerry (2005). CyberRadicalism: A New Left for a Global Age. Lulu.com. p. 310. ISBN 1411640071.
- Davidson, Carl; Katz, Marilyn (2010). Stopping War, Seeking Justice. Lulu.com. p. 114. ISBN 978-1411638006.
- Davidson, Carl (2011). Revolutionary Youth And The New Working Class. Lulu.com. p. 282. ISBN 978-1257999477.
- Davidson, Carl (2011). New Paths to Socialism. Lulu.com. p. 134. ISBN 978-1257820351.

== Bibliography ==
- «Left in Form, Right in Essence A Critique of Contemporary Trotskyism» by Carl Davidson. Second printing Spring 1974. This pamphlet was originally published as a series of 12 articles in early 1973 in the Guardian (NY) newsweekly.
- «Solidarity Economy»by Carl Davidson et al. Essays and discussions at 2007 World Social Forum in Atlanta.
- «CyberRadicalism: A New Left for a Global Age» by Carl Davidson and Jerry Harris. Essays on the social impact of technology on Marxism and 21st century socialism, written between 1995 and 2005.
