= Pink-collar worker =

Someone working in the care-oriented career field

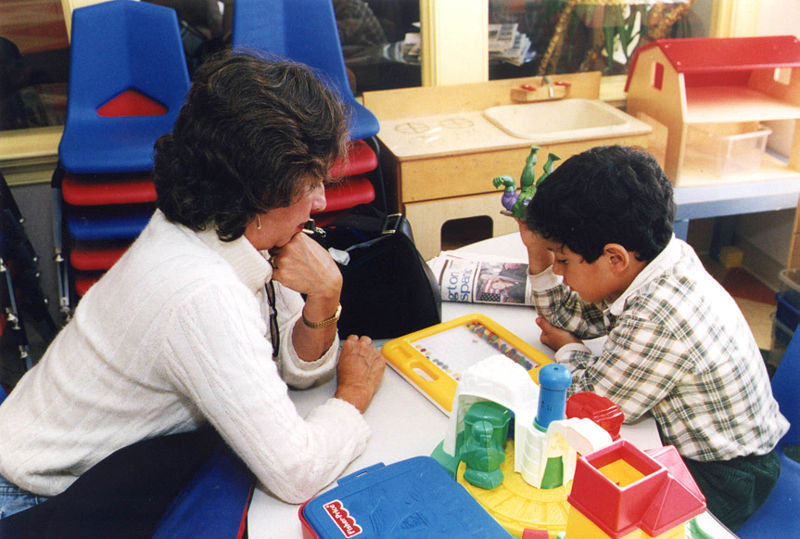
A special education teacher assists one of her students

A pink-collar worker is someone working in career fields historically considered to be women's work. This includes many clerical, administrative, and service jobs as well as care-oriented jobs in therapy, nursing, social work, teaching or child care. While these jobs may also be filled by men, they have historically been female-dominated (a tendency that continues today, though to a somewhat lesser extent) and may pay significantly less than white-collar or blue-collar jobs.

Women's work – notably with the delegation of women to particular fields within the workplace – began to rise in the 1940s, in concurrence with World War II.

== History ==
William Jack Baumol first used the term pink collar in his 1967 article "Macroeconomics of Unbalanced Growth: The Anatomy of Urban Crisis." He introduced the term to describe a category of jobs predominantly held by women, often in clerical, administrative, or service-oriented roles. Baumol's focus was not only on the gendered nature of these jobs but also on their economic characteristics, particularly their relatively lower wages and limited opportunities for advancement compared to male-dominated professions. His analysis tied these roles to broader economic discussions about productivity and wage stagnation in labour markets. Baumol's use of the term provided an early economic framing of gendered divisions in the workforce, highlighting structural inequalities that persist in discussions of labour economics.

Louise Kapp Howe popularized the term in her 1977 book Pink Collar Workers: Inside the World of Women’s Work. She used the term to describe jobs predominantly occupied by women, such as secretarial, clerical, teaching, nursing, and other caregiving or service roles. These positions were seen as extensions of traditional domestic responsibilities and were characterized by lower pay, limited career advancement opportunities, and a lack of prestige compared to "blue-collar" or "white-collar" jobs. Howe’s analysis went beyond simply identifying these roles; she explored how social expectations, gender norms, and structural inequalities confined women to these positions. She critiqued how these jobs were undervalued despite their essential contributions to the economy and society. Her work aimed to raise awareness about the economic and social disparities faced by women in the workforce and to advocate for the recognition and improvement of conditions in these roles. While Baumol's earlier usage of pink collar focused on economic categorizations, Howe expanded the term into a cultural and feminist critique, framing it as part of the broader struggle for gender equality in labour.

== Occupations ==
Pink-collar occupations tend to be personal-service-oriented workers working in retail, nursing, and teaching (depending on the level), are part of the service sector, and are among the most common occupations in the United States. The Bureau of Labor Statistics estimates that, as of May 2008, there were over 2.2 million persons employed as servers in the United States. Furthermore, the World Health Organization's 2011 World Health Statistics Report states that there were 19.3 million nurses in the world. In the United States, women constituted 92.1% of the registered nurses that were then employed.

According to the 2016 United States Census analyzed by Tiffany D. Barnes and colleagues, more than 95% of the construction workforce is male. Due to the low population of women outside of the childcare or social workforce, state governments are miscalculating economic budgets by not accounting for most female pink-collar workers. Generally, less government funding is allocated to professions and work environments that traditionally employ and retain a greater percentage of women, for example, education and social work. From the research conducted by Tiffany Barnes, Victoria Beall, and Mirya Holman, discrepancies in government representation of pink-collar jobs could primarily be due to legislatures and government employees having the perspective for only white-collar jobs, and most people making budgetary decisions are men. A white-collar job is typically administrative.

As explained in Buzzanell et al.'s research article, maternity leave is the time off from work a mother takes after having a child, either through childbirth or adoption. In 2010, the International Labour Organization explained that maternity leave is usually compensated by the employer's company, but several countries do not follow that mandate, including the United States. Results from "Standpoints of Maternity Leave: Discourses of Temporality and Ability" state that many new mothers employed in pink-collar work have keyed disability or sick leave instead of time off for maternity leave.

Pink-collar occupations may include:

=== Architecture ===
- Interior designer
- Landscape designer

=== Education ===
- Primary teacher
- Preschool teacher/early childhood educator/kindergarten teacher/nursery nurse
- Special education teacher
- Teaching assistant
- Librarian/teacher-librarian
- Library assistant/library technician

=== Healthcare ===
- Midwife
- Psychiatric rehabilitation specialist
- Occupational therapist
- Physical therapist
- Speech-language pathologist/speech and language therapist
- Nutritionist/dietitian
- Dental assistant
- Social worker
- Psychologist
- Medical and health service managers
- Mental health counselor
- Pharmacy technician
- Dental hygienist
- Lactation consultant
- Nurse
- Wet nurse
- medical assistant/healthcare assistant/nurse's aide
- Hospital attendant/hospital service worker/hospital orderly

=== Administration ===
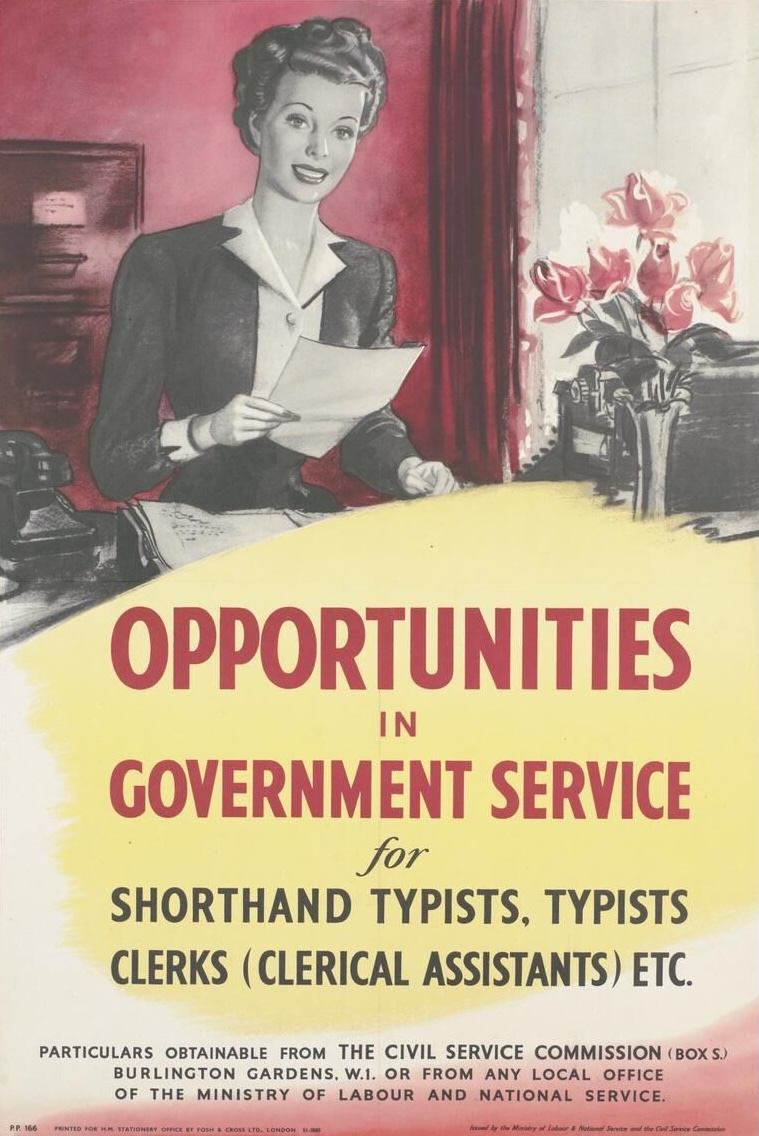
A World War II-era recruiting poster seeking women for clerical work

- Advertising and promotions managers
- Bank teller
- Bookkeeper
- Marketing coordinator/marketing assistant
- Human resources manager
- Legal secretary
- Paralegal
- Public relations manager
- Receptionist
- Secretary/administrative assistant/information clerk
- Data entry clerk/Shorthand
- Meeting and convention planner
- Tax examiner/revenue agent

=== Entertainment ===
- Dancer

=== Fashion ===
- Hairstylist/barber/hair colorist
- Dressmaker/costume designer/tailor/Sewing/image consultant
- Cosmetologist/make-up artist/nail technician/perfumer/aesthetician
- Model
- Personal stylist/fashion stylist
- Henna/Mehndi artist
- Buyer

=== Media ===
- Magazine editor

=== Personal care and service ===
- Valet
- Waitress/barista/bartender/busser
- Flight attendant/stewardess
- Museum docent/tour guide
- Casino host
- Doula/caregiver
- Babysitter/daycare worker/nanny/child-care provider
- Domestic worker/maid services attendant
- Cleaner
- Massage therapist
- Florist
- Camp counselor/non-profit volunteer coordinator/recreation director
- Relationship counselor/family therapist/social worker
- Travel agent
- Wedding planner/event planner
- Hotel housekeeper/chambermaid
- Cashier/waiting staff
- Retail clerks/retail salesperson/retail manager
- Food preparation worker/counter attendant/cafeteria attendant
- Personal care attendant/personal or home care aide
- Car attendant
- Washroom attendant
- Parking enforcement officer/parking lot attendant

=== Sport ===
- Cheerleader
- Dancer/choreographer/dance instructor
- Fitness instructor

== Background (United States) ==
Historically, women were responsible for the running of a household. Their financial security was often dependent upon a male patriarch. Widowed or divorced women struggled to support themselves and their children.

Western women began to develop more opportunities when they moved into the paid workplace, formerly of the male domain. In the mid 19th and early 20th century women aimed to be treated as equals to their male counterparts, notably in the Seneca Falls Convention. In 1920 American women legally gained the right to vote, marking a turning point for the American women's suffrage movement; yet race and class remained as impediments to voting for some women.

At the turn of the 19th century into the 20th, large numbers of single women in the United States traveled to large cities such as New York where they found work in factories and sweatshops, working for low pay operating sewing machines, sorting feathers, rolling tobacco, and other similar menial tasks.

In these factories, workers frequently breathed dangerous fumes and worked with flammable materials. In order for factories to save money, women were required to clean and adjust the machines while they were running, which resulted in accidents where women lost their fingers or hands. Many women who worked in the factories earned meager wages for working long hours in unsafe conditions and as a result lived in poverty.

Throughout the 20th century, women such as Emily Balch, Jane Addams, and Lillian Wald were advocates for evolving the roles of women in America. These women created settlement houses and launched missions in overcrowded squalid immigrant neighborhoods to offer social services to women and children.

In addition, women gradually became more involved with church activities and came to take on more leadership roles in various religious societies. The women who joined these societies worked with their members, some of whom were full-time teachers, nurses, missionaries, and social workers to accomplish their leadership tasks. The Association for the Sociology of Religion was the first to elect a woman president in 1938.

=== Invention of the typewriter ===
Typically, clerk positions were filled by young men who used the position as an apprenticeship and opportunity to learn basic office functions before moving on to management positions. In the 1860s and 1870s, widespread use of the typewriter made women appear better suited for clerk positions. With their smaller fingers, women were perceived to be better able to operate the new machines. By 1885, new methods of note-taking and the expanding scope of businesses led office-clerk positions to be in high demand. Having a secretary became a status symbol, and these new types of positions were relatively well paid.

=== World War I and II ===
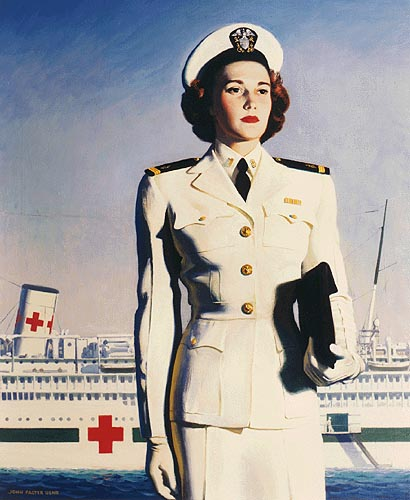
A United States Navy recruiting poster from World War II, showing an officer of the Navy WAVES before a hospital ship

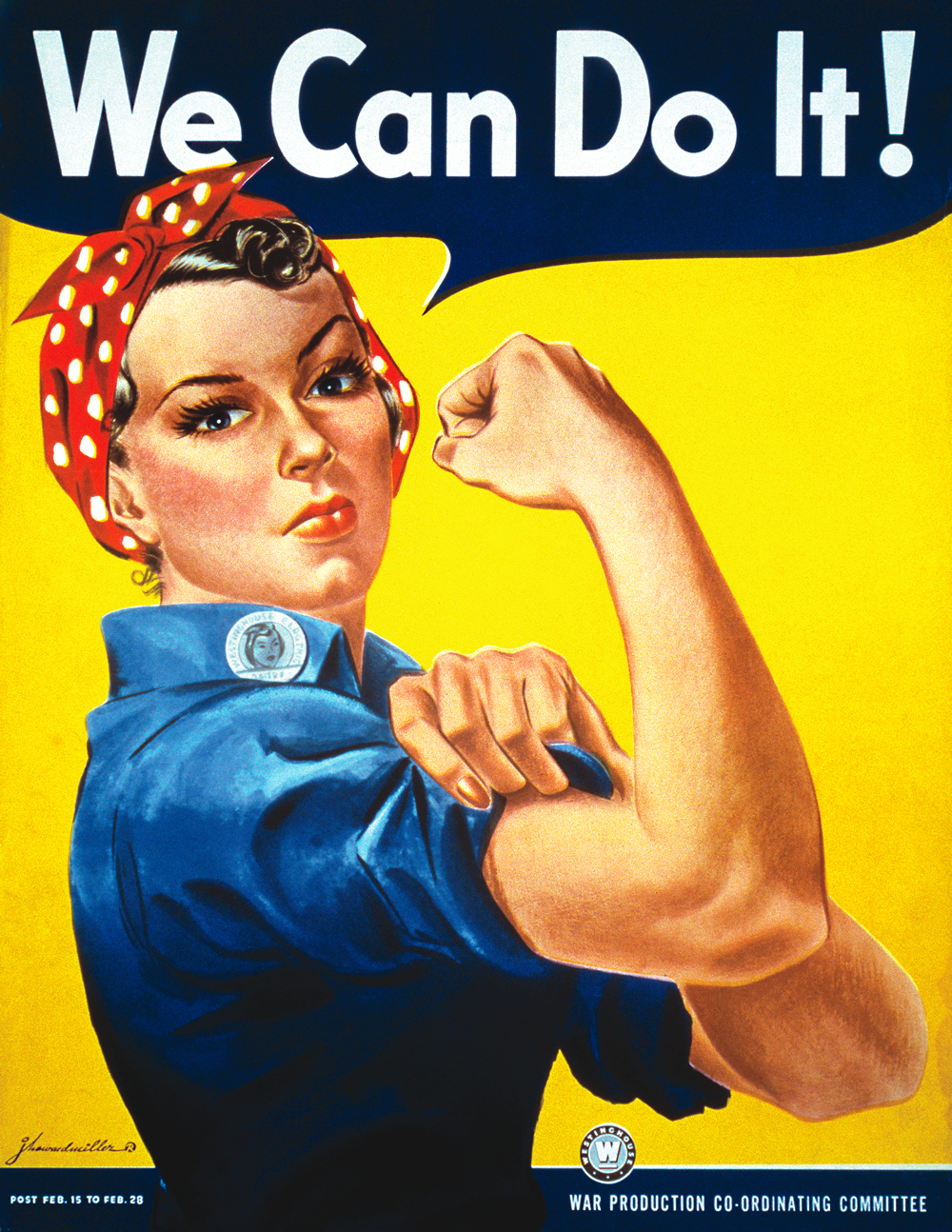
This poster made in 1942 titled "We Can Do It!" captures the WWII era cultural icon Rosie the Riveter depicted by J. Howard Miller who created this poster as an inspirational image to boost female worker morale.

World War I sparked a demand for "pink-collar jobs" as the military needed personnel to type letters, answer phones, and perform other secretarial tasks. One thousand women worked for the U.S. Navy as stenographers, clerks, and telephone operators.

In addition, Military nurses, an already "feminized" and accepted profession for women, expanded during wartime. In 1917, Louisa Lee Schuyler opened the Bellevue Hospital School of Nursing, which was the first to train women as professional nurses. After completing training, female nurses worked in hospitals or more predominantly in field tents.

World War II marked the emergence of large numbers of women working domestically in industrial jobs to assist in the war effort as directed under the War Manpower Commission which recruited women to fill war manufacturing jobs.

Notably, American women in World War II joined the armed services and were stationed domestically and abroad through participation in non-combat military roles and as medical personnel. One thousand female pilots joined the Women Airforce Service Pilots, one hundred and forty thousand women joined the Women's Army Corps and one hundred thousand women joined the United States Navy as nurses through WAVES in addition to administrative staff.

== 20th-century female working world (United States) ==
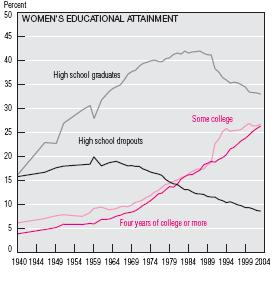
This graph shows the increase in women graduating high school and attending college, while there is a decrease in high school dropouts.

A typical job sought by working women in the early 20th century was a telephone operator or Hello Girl. The Hello Girls began as women who operated on telephone switchboards during WWI by answering telephones and talking to impatient callers in a calming tone. The workers would sit on stools facing a wall with hundreds of outlets and tiny blinking lights. They had to work quickly when a light flashed by plugging the cord into the proper outlet. Despite the difficult work, many women wanted this job because it paid five dollars a week and provided a rest lounge for the employees to take a break.

Female secretaries were also popular. They were instructed to be efficient, tough, and hardworking while also appearing soft, accommodating, and subservient. Women were expected to be the protector and partner to their boss behind closed doors and a helpmate in public. These women were encouraged to go to charm schools and express their personality through fashion instead of furthering their education.

Social work became a female-dominated profession in the 1930s, emphasizing a group professional identity and the casework method. Social workers gave crucial expertise for the expansion of federal, state and local government, as well as services to meet the needs of the Depression.

Teachers in primary and secondary schools remained female, although as the war progressed, women began to move on to better employment and higher salaries. In 1940, teaching positions paid less than $1,500 a year and fell to $800 in rural areas.

Women scientists found it hard to gain appointments at universities. Women scientists were forced to take positions in high schools, state or women's colleges, governmental agencies and alternative institutions such as libraries or museums. Women who took jobs at such places often did clerical duties and though some held professional positions, these boundaries were blurred. Some found work as human computers.

Mostly women were hired as librarians, who had been professionalized and feminized from the late 19th century. In 1920, women accounted for 88% of librarians in the United States.

Two-thirds of the American Geographical Society (AGS)'s employees were women, who served as librarians, editorial personnel in the publishing programs, secretaries, research editors, copy editors, proofreaders, research assistants and sales staff. These women came with credentials from well-known colleges and universities and many were overqualified for their positions, but later were promoted to more prestigious positions.

Although female employees did not receive equal pay, they did get sabbaticals to attend university and to travel for their professions at the cost of the AGS. Those women working managerial and library or museums positions made an impact on women in the work force, but still encountered discrimination when they tried to advance.

In the 1940s, clerical work expanded to occupy the largest number of women employees, this field diversified as it moved into commercial service. The average worker in the 1940s was over 35 years old, married, and needed to work to keep their families afloat.

During the 1950s, women were taught that marriage and domesticity were more important than a career. Most women followed this path because of the uncertainty of the post-war years. Suburban housewives were encouraged to have hobbies like bread making and sewing. The 1950s housewife was in conflict between being "just a housewife" because their upbringing taught them competition and achievement. Many women had furthered their education deriving a sense of self-worth.

As mentioned in the research article by Patrice Buzzanell, Robyn Remke, Rebecca Meisenbach, Meina Liu, Venessa Bowers, and Cindy Conn, as of 2016, pink-collar jobs are quickly growing in demand by both men and women. Professions within pink-collar jobs are more likely to be consistent with job security and the need for employment, but salary and advancements seem to be much more slow-growing factors.

=== Pay ===
A single woman working in a factory in the early 20th century earned less than $8 a week, which is equivalent to roughly less than $98 a week today. If the woman was absent or was late, employers penalized them by docking their pay. These women would live in boarding houses costing $1.50 a week, waking at 5:30 a.m. to start their ten-hour work day. When women entered the paid workforce in the 1920s they were paid less than men because employers thought the women's jobs were temporary. Employers also paid women less than men because they believed in the "Pin Money Theory", which said that women's earnings were secondary to that of their male counterparts. Married working women experienced lopsided stress and overload because they were still responsible for the majority of the housework and taking care of the children. This left women isolated and subjected them to their husband's control.

In the early 1900s women's pay was one to three dollars a week and much of that went to living expenses. In the 1900s female tobacco strippers earned five dollars a week, half of what their male coworkers made and seamstresses made six to seven dollars a week compared to a cutter's salary of $16. This differed from women working in factories in the 1900s as they were paid by the piece, not receiving a fixed weekly wage. Those that were pinching pennies pushed themselves to produce more product so that they earned more money. Women who earned enough to live on found it impossible to keep their salary rate from being reduced because bosses often made "mistakes" in computing a worker's piece rate. As well as this, women who received this kind of treatment did not disagree for fear of losing their jobs. Employers would frequently deduct pay for work they deemed imperfect and for simply trying to lighten the mood by laughing or talking while they worked. In the 1937 a woman's average yearly salary was $525 compared to a man's salary of $1,027. In the 1940s two-thirds of the women who were in the labor force suffered a decrease in earnings; the average weekly paychecks fell from $50 to $37. This gap in wage stayed consistent, as women in 1991 only earned seventy percent of what men earned regardless of their education.

Later on in the 1970s and 1980s as women began to fight for equality, they fought against discrimination in jobs where women worked and the educational institutions that would lead to those jobs. In 1973 the average salaries for women were 57% compared to those of men, but this gender earnings gap was especially noticeable in pink-collar jobs where the largest number of women were employed. Women were given routine, less responsible jobs available and often with a lower pay than men. These jobs were monotonous and mechanical often with assembly-line procedures.

=== Education ===
Women entering the workforce had difficulty finding a satisfactory job without references or an education. However, opportunities for higher education expanded as women were admitted to all-male schools like the United States service academies and Ivy League strongholds. Education became a way for society to shape women into its ideal housewife. In the 1950s, authorities and educators encouraged college because they found new value in vocational training for domesticity. College prepared women for future roles because while men and women were taught together, they were groomed for different paths after they graduated. Education started out as a way to teach women how to be a good wife, but education also allowed women to broaden their minds.

Being educated was an expectation for women entering the paying workforce, despite the fact that their male equivalents did not need a high school diploma. While in college, a woman would experience extracurricular activities, such as a sorority, that offered a separate space for the woman to practice types of social service work that was expected from her.

However, not all of a woman's education was done in the classroom. Women were also educated through their peers through "dating". Men and women no longer had to be supervised when alone together. Dating allowed men and women to practice the paired activities that would later become a way of life.

New women's organizations sprouted up working to reform and protect women in the workplace. The largest and most prestigious of these organizations was the General Federation of Women's Clubs (GFWC), whose members were conservative middle-class housewives. The International Ladies Garment Workers Union (ILGWU) was formed after women shirtwaist makers went on strike in New York City in 1909. It started as a small walkout, with a handful of members from one shop and grew to a force of ten of thousands, changing the course of the labor movement forever. In 1910 women allied themselves with the Progressive Party who sought to reform social issues.

Another organization that grew out of women in the workforce, was the Women's Bureau of the Department of Labor. The Women's Bureau regulated conditions for women employees. As female labor became a crucial part of the economy, efforts by the Women's Bureau increased. The Bureau pushed for employers to take advantage of "women-power" and persuaded women to enter the employment market.

In 1913 the ILGWU signed the well-known "protocol in the Dress and Waist Industry" which was the first contract between labor and management settled by outside negotiators. The contract formalized the trade's division of labor by gender.

Another win for women came in 1921 when Congress passed the Sheppard–Towner Act, a welfare measure intended to reduce infant and maternal mortality; it was the first federally funded healthcare act. The act provided federal funds to establish health centers for prenatal and child care. Expectant mothers and children could receive health checkups and health advice.

In 1963 the Equal Pay Act was passed making it the first federal law against sex discrimination, equal pay for equal work (at least removed explicit base pay discrepancies based on sex), and had employers allow both men and women applicants to open positions if they qualified from the start.

Unions also became a major outlet for women to fight against the unfair treatment they experienced. Women who joined these types of unions stayed before and after work to talk about the benefits of the union, collect dues, obtain charters, and form bargaining committees.

The National Recovery Administration (NRA) was approved in May 1933. The NRA negotiated codes designed to rekindle production. It raised wages, shortened workers' hours, and increased employment for the first time maximizing hour and minimizing wage provisions benefiting female workers. The NRA had its flaws however, it only covered half of the women in the workforce particularly manufacturing and trade. The NRA regulated working conditions only for women with a job and did not offer any relief for the two million unemployed women who desperately needed it.

The 1930s proved successful for women in the workplace thanks to federal relief programs and the growth of unions. For the first time women were not completely dependent on themselves, in 1933 the federal government expanded in its responsibility to female workers. In 1938 the Fair Labor Standards Act grew out of several successful strikes. Two million women joined the workforce during the Great Depression despite negative public opinion.

== 21st-century female working world (United Kingdom) ==
Today, the economy in the United Kingdom still shows a prominent divide in a workforce with many occupations still labeled as "pink-collar". 28% of women worked jobs labeled under "pink-collar" in Rotherham, a town in northern England. This study was conducted in 2010. In the United Kingdom, careers within nursing and teaching are not considered pink-collar jobs anymore, but instead are labeled as white-collar. This shift is also occurring in many other countries. Studies show that white-collar workers are less likely to face health disparities.

== Pink ghetto ==
"Pink ghetto" and "velvet ghetto" are terms used to describe low-paying occupations in which women historically constituted a majority of the workforce. In their 1983 book Poverty in the American Dream: Women and Children First, authors Karin Stallard, Barbara Ehrenreich, and Holly Sklar used the term "pink collar ghetto" to discuss the increasing participation of women in the paid labour force and the persistent economic disadvantages they faced in jobs that were often dead-end, stressful and underpaid.

"Pink ghetto" can also describe the placement of female managers into positions that will not lead them to the board room, thus perpetuating the "glass ceiling". This includes managerial roles in human resources, customer service, and other areas that do not contribute to the corporate "bottom line". While such roles allow women to rise in rank as managers, their careers may eventually stall, and they may be excluded from the upper echelons.

=== Pink ghetto in the field of public relations ===
The terms "pink collar ghetto" and "velvet ghetto" can also describe a twentieth-century phenomenon wherein the status and pay grade of a profession dropped after an influx of women workers into that field. A 1986 study by the International Association of Business Communicators explored the gendered dynamics and implications of the increasing presence of women in public relations and business communication roles. The study found that the influx of women coincided with a devaluation of the professions in terms of social prestige and financial compensation. Some scholars, such as Elizabeth Toth, claimed this was partially the result of women taking technician roles instead of managerial roles, being less likely to negotiate higher pay, and being assumed to be putting family life before work, even when that was not the case. Other scholars, such as Kim Golombisky, cited biases against women (especially minority and working-class women) as another cause of this phenomenon. Recent studies by data scientist Felix Busch and others have shown that the devaluation of occupations due to feminization has been declining since the mid-twentieth century, becoming statistically insignificant in 2015.

Traditionally, feminism in public relations focused on gender equality, but new scholarship makes claims that focusing on social justice would better aid the feminist cause in the field. This brings the idea of intersectionality into the pink-collar ghetto. The issue is not caused by what women lack as professionals, but caused by larger societal injustices and interlocking systems of oppression that systematically burden women.

== The mythology of "pink collaring" in museums and the arts ==
The authors who first described "pink collar" work, including William Jack Baumol, Louise Kapp Howe, Karin Stallard, Barbara Ehrenreich, and Holly Sklar, used the term to criticize the unfair systems trapping women in low-paying jobs. They sought to end the sexist practices and assumptions causing gender inequality in the workplace. By contrast, between 2016 and 2020, influential museum leaders in the United States reinterpreted the term "pink collar" to argue that women’s growing presence in museum professions and on art faculties would inevitably drive down pay in those fields. Proponents of this notion include Joan Baldwin and Anne Ackerson, founders of the Gender Equity in Museums Movement (GEMM), and art museum director Kaywin Feldman. Feldman argued in 2020 that hiring more men in these fields was necessary to preserve their status.

Proponents of this "pink collaring" theory have cited a 2016 New York Times article by columnist Claire Cain Miller. In "As Women Take Over a Male-Dominated Field, the Pay Drops," Miller summarized a 2009 longitudinal study by sociologists Asaf Levanon, Paula England, and Paul Allison demonstrating a consistent twentieth-century trend wherein US occupations with a higher percentage of women offered lower median hourly wages than comparable fields that retained male majorities. Miller overlooked both the historical nature of Levanon, England, and Allison’s findings and a problem that the authors themselves acknowledged, namely, that they did not investigate the mechanisms driving gender-based workplace devaluation or how resistant it might be to change. Examining more current census data and using different analytical tools, the data scientist Felix Busch demonstrated in 2018 that occupational devaluation due to feminization has been steadily declining since the mid-twentieth century, that it does not affect all fields equally, and that some workers experience a wage benefit from the feminization of their field. He also showed that a field’s historical gender associations have more impact on wages than the field’s current gender composition. This and other research disproves the notion that an occupation’s gender composition inevitably affects compensation. Favoring men in hiring decisions because of their gender is illegal in the United States under Title VII of the 1964 Civil Rights Act.

== Male integration ==
Judy Wajcman argues that technology has historically been monopolized by men, serving as a significant source of their power. However, the advent of new technology has disrupted traditional blue-collar work, pushing more millennial men into pink-collar roles. Machines now perform many factory tasks once associated with masculinity, displacing unskilled or semi-skilled male workers. A 1990 study by Allan H. Hunt and Timothy L. Hunt concluded that uneducated, unskilled blue-collar workers are most vulnerable to job displacement caused by robotics. Robotics and automation have not only eliminated many traditionally male-dominated roles but have also forced men into pink-collar jobs, which are often perceived as less prestigious due to associations with "women's work." Wajcman further notes that skills involving machines and physical strength are culturally tied to masculinity, while pink-collar jobs, which typically require less technical skill, are associated with women. Ironically, the very technologies designed and monopolized by men are now displacing them, resulting in a shift to roles like teaching, nursing, and childcare—fields that come with significant stigma for men. Men in these professions often face discrimination and negative stereotypes, as traditional views associate men with professionalism, strength, and dominance.

An analysis of 2016 United States Census data shows that approximately 78% of men were employed in cleaning and maintenance, engineering and science, production and transportation, protective services, and construction, while only 25% worked in healthcare support, personal care, education, office administration support, and social services.

=== Men in pink-collar jobs ===
Despite challenges, some men in pink-collar professions achieve advantages such as higher salaries, more opportunities, and faster promotions compared to their female counterparts. However, stereotyping and hostility remain barriers, often reducing workplace performance and retention rates for men in these roles. Men who remain in these professions longer tend to adapt and experience less discrimination, while newly hired men report higher turnover rates. For example, the Australian Bureau of Statistics found that less than 20% of elementary school teachers were men, highlighting the persistent gender imbalance in such fields.

== See also ==
- Blue-collar worker
- Designation of workers by collar color
- Office lady
- White-collar worker
- Women's work
- Glass escalator

== Bibliography ==
- Baumol, William J. (1967). "Macroeconomics of Unbalanced Growth: The Anatomy of Urban Crisis." The American Economic Review, 57(3), 415-426.
- Howe, Louise Kapp (1977). Pink Collar Workers: Inside the World of Women's Work. New York: Putnam.
- Gourley, Catherine (2008). Gibson Girls and Suffragists: Perceptions of Women from 1900 to 1918 (Minneapolis, MN: Twenty-First Century Books) ISBN 978-0-8225-7150-6
- Humowitz, Carol; Weissman, Michelle (1978). A History of Women in America (New York: Anti-Defamation League of B'nai B'rith) ISBN 0-553-20762-8
- Stallard, Karin; Ehrenreich, Barbara; and Sklar, Holly (1983). Poverty in the American Dream: Women and Children First. Boston: Sounth End Press.
- Ware, Susan (1982). Holding Their Own. Boston: G.K. Hall & Co. ISBN 978-0-8057-9900-2.
- Woloch, Nancy (1984). Women and the American Experience. New York: Alfred A. Knopf. ISBN 978-0-394-53515-9.
