= José La Luz =

Labor activist

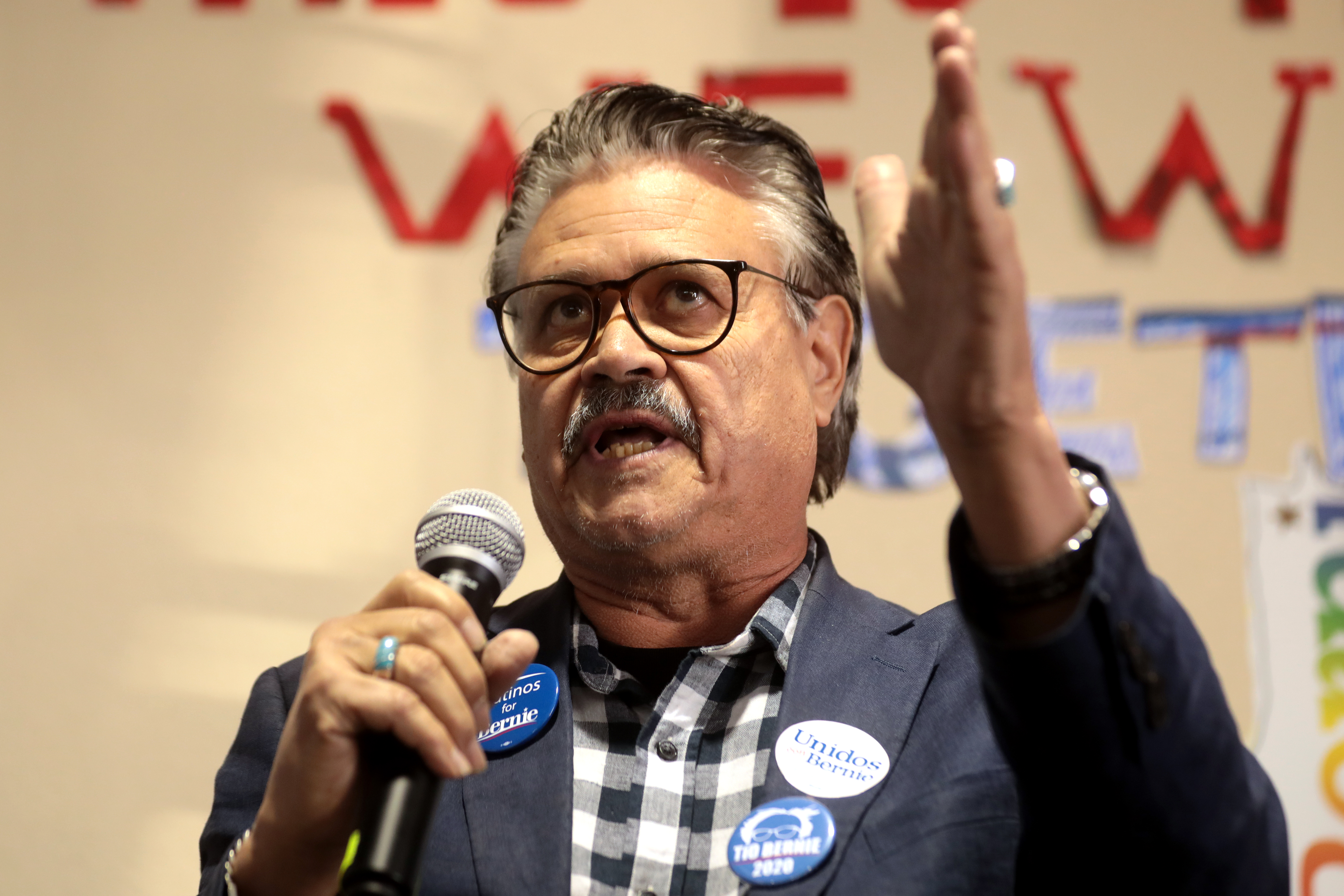
La Luz in February 2020.

José La Luz (Spanish pronunciation [xo'se la luz]; born October 12, 1950) is a labor activist who organizes, promotes and advocates for worker rights in Puerto Rico and the United States. He was the architect of the grassroots campaign that resulted in the 1998 passage of Puerto Rico's Law 45, which granted bargaining rights and allowed for the unionization of over 120,000 public employees. La Luz was the Associate Director of the Leadership Academy for the American Federation of State, County and Municipal Employees until his retirement in 2014. La Luz also served on the National Political Committee of the Democratic Socialists of America.

== Early life and education ==
A native of Santurce, Puerto Rico, La Luz comes from a working-class family and spent his primary years living on the island. La Luz credits his grandfather – a self-made small merchant in the mountain town of Ciales – and his mother, a rural school teacher who nurtured and educated poor children in nearby barrios, with being his key role models by mentoring him and instilling a sense of compassion and justice. They were the ones who planted the earliest seeds of consciousness that lead La Luz into advocating for workers rights as an adult, which included bargaining for better wages, work hours, working conditions and overall more humane treatment.

While growing up in Puerto Rico in the 1950s and 1960s, La Luz's grandfather used to take him to the tobacco, coffee and sugarcane fields in Puerto Rico where he witnessed first hand the plight of poor Puerto Ricans who were toiling these fields to earn their meager livelihoods. Having seen the swollen bellies of their children who were malnourished and whose fathers pushed relentlessly to work the fields while living in the poorest of conditions – many in shacks without running water, electricity and with poor hygienic conditions – La Luz began to understand the importance of working for the sensible human rights of those who had no voice. The fight for basic rights and justice for all people, no matter who they were or where they were from became his life's passion.

La Luz attended the University of Puerto Rico where he embarked on the study of social sciences, before transferring with a sports scholarship from the YMCA to Springfield College in Springfield, Massachusetts. He is a graduate of SUNY’s Empire State College with a Bachelor’s degree in Labor Studies. Later he obtained a master’s degree in labor studies at Rutgers University.

During his college years, La Luz became involved in the Students for a Democratic Society, speaking out on issues such as the war in Vietnam. He also became involved with local Puerto Rican farm workers organizations in the Tobacco Valley in Connecticut and Massachusetts. La Luz was one of the key community organizers to secure new rights for migrant workers in the area by putting public pressure on the Labor Department of Puerto Rico and denouncing the deplorable conditions that the migrant workers were working under. He also helped merge the local farm workers with Cesar Chavez’s United Farm Workers of America.

== Alliances and political influence ==
While leading the fight for passage of collective bargaining rights in Puerto Rico in the early 1990s, La Luz developed a multipartisan strategy in organizing and advocating for public worker rights, and thus he worked with elected officials from all major political parties in the island including former Governors Pedro Rosselló and Sila María Calderón.

Pedro Rosselló will sign into law today the unionization project for public workers, of which indicates the process for dozens of labor organizations seeking representation for nearly 200,000 employee in the central government… various union leaders who supported the project will attend the ceremony to sign the legislative piece…among the leaders invited by Rosselló is Jose La Luz, the managing director of the United Public Service Workers, affiliated with the American Federation of State, County and Municipal Employees (AFSCME).

After achieving passage of landmark legislation granting collective bargaining rights for public service workers sponsored by the pro-statehood Governor Pedro Rosselló; La Luz would eventually lead the negotiations of the first contracts under a different administration led by the first woman elected Governor of Puerto Rico, Sila María Calderón, of the pro Commonwealth PDP.

Through AFSCME, La Luz was assigned to assist in Hillary Clinton’s 2008 primary election campaign. He subsequently worked on Barack Obama's presidential election and reelection campaigns. In 2020, he was a national surrogate for the Bernie Sanders campaign.

La Luz is a longtime member of the Democratic Socialists of America. He previously served on the National Political Committee, the leadership body of the organization.

== Recent achievements ==
Widely recognized as a labor strategist and intellectual, La Luz has served as a Visiting Labor Leader in residence at Cornell University, having written white papers on organizing strategies in labor unions, as well as serving as an instructor in the Labor Studies Programs at Michigan State and Rutgers universities. He became a Wurf Fellow in the Kennedy School State and Local Government Program at Harvard University in 2007. In 2011, La Luz received a lifetime achievement award for his distinguished career as one of America’s outstanding labor educators from the United Association for Labor Education.

=== NAFTA and the ACTWU ===
La Luz has a long history in Organized Labor, and not just in one union. One of the most important examples of his work is with the Amalgamated Clothing and Textile Workers Union (ACTWU), a union that played a pivotal role in the North American Free Trade Agreement (NAFTA) debates during the Clinton administration in the early 1990s. During that time, La Luz was the international director of the ACTWU when the NAFTA debate to eliminate barriers to investment and trade between the United States, Mexico and Canada raged in the US.

The ACTWU represented workers in the most vulnerable industries, clothing and textile and instead of opposing trade and economic integration in general, it advocated for the inclusion of strong labor and environmental protections in the main frame of the proposed treaty in order to protect and raise the standard of living of workers affected by the agreement in all three countries, the US, Mexico and Canada. In the early 1990s La Luz became one of the leading voices in debating these topics in many forums sponsored by one of the major Latino organizations in the country, the Southwest Voter Registration Education Project before NAFTA was ratified. La Luz engaged in a cross-country discussion with important political figures such as Felipe Calderón long before he became President of Mexico.

=== Restoration of bargaining rights for public workers ===
Among La Luz's most recent achievements is the restoration on May 17, 2011 of public worker rights in Puerto Rico after Puerto Rico Law 45 was nullified by the passage of a new fiscal austerity Law 7 by the current Governor of Puerto Rico Luis Fortuño- a Republican- amidst one of the worst fiscal and economic recessions that Puerto Rico has endured. Law 7 effectively suspended collective agreement clauses in an effort to repress public employees and strip them of collective bargaining rights. Law 7 also caused massive layoffs in Puerto Rico of over 19,000 public sector employees and aggravated an already dismal economic unemployment rate that affected thousands of working families struggling to make ends meet. La Luz was fundamental in speaking out against the injustices by insisting on the need to restore bargaining rights for public workers. In his impassioned speech at the Labor Day celebration sponsored by the President of the PR Senate, La Luz made the case for restoration as he once again led a grassroots lobbying campaign along with other union leaders and the Senate President which resulted in the passage of Law 73 that restored the contracts that had been originally suspended by Law 7.

== Publications ==
- LaLuz, Jose (1991) “Creating a Culture of Organizing: ACTWU’s Education for Empowerment,” Labor Research Review Vol. I. No. 17, Article 7. Available at: https://ecommons.cornell.edu/entities/publication/1f04a596-7979-4354-93b6-a657fd1f43c3
