= Greater Armenia =

Greater Armenia may refer to:

- Ancient Armenia, independent from 331 BC to 428 АD, known as Greater Armenia (or "Armenia Major") to distinguish it from Roman-controlled Lesser Armenia (or "Armenia Minor")
- United Armenia, a political goal of Armenian irredentists, sometimes known as "Greater Armenia"

== See also ==
- Armenia (disambiguation)
