= South End Press =

American non-profit publisher

- Status: Defunct (July 2014)
- Founded: 1977
- Defunct: 2014
- Country of origin: United States
- Headquarters location: Boston (1977–2009); Brooklyn (2009–2014)
- Publication types: Books
- Owners: Worker-owned and -operated collective
- Official website: southendpress.org

South End Press was a non-profit book publisher run on a model of participatory economics. It was founded in 1977 in Boston's South End. It published books written by political activists, notably Arundhati Roy, Noam Chomsky, bell hooks, Winona LaDuke, Manning Marable, Ward Churchill, Cherríe Moraga, Andrea Smith, Howard Zinn, Jeremy Brecher, Lawrence Soley and Scott Tucker. South End Press closed in 2014.

== History ==
South End Press was founded in 1977 by Michael Albert, Lydia Sargent, John Schall, Pat Walker, Juliet Schor, Mary Lea, Joe Bowring, and Dave Millikin, among others. It was based in Boston's South End and run as an egalitarian collective with decision-making equally shared.

The publisher experienced financial difficulties in the 2008 financial crisis, with sales dropping by 12.8% in 2008. In 2009, South End Press moved to a new office in Brooklyn, New York, partnering with Medgar Evers College of the City University of New York. A fundraising campaign was run in 2012 to help ease its financial situation.

South End Press closed in July 2014. Howard Zinn and an anonymous author had reportedly not received royalties for several years.

== Legacy ==
Some of South End Press's catalog has been republished including work by Howard Zinn, Noam Chomsky, Dana Frank and Vanessa Tait (by Haymarket Books), Jeremy Brecher (by PM Press), and Eli Clare, Andrea Smith, Frank B. Wilderson III and Dean Spade (by Duke University Press), and Vandana Shiva (by North Atlantic Books).

In 2014, commenting on the demise of the publisher, Monthly Review said it was "an important and vital part of the overall left movement".

== Related projects ==
The founders of South End Press have also been involved with two ongoing political media projects, 'Speak Out' and 'Z Magazine'. They have worked with a number of media and research institutions including Alternative Radio, Political Research Associates, the Committee on Women, Population and the Environment, and INCITE! Women of Color Against Violence.

== Publications ==
- Brecher, Jeremy. Strike!
- Chomsky, Noam. Fateful Triangle: The United States, Israel, and the Palestinians. Foreword by Edward W. Said.
- Churchill, Ward; Wall, Jim Vander. Agents of Repression: The FBI’s Secret Wars Against the American Indian Movement and the Black Panther Party.
- Churchill, Ward; Wall, Jim Vander. The COINTELPRO Papers: Documents From the FBI’s Secret Wars Against Dissent in the United States.
- Clare, Eli. Exile & Pride: Disability, Queerness, and Liberation. Afterword by Dean Spade.
- Frank, Dana. Bananeras: Women Transforming the Banana Unions of Latin America.
- Georgakas, Dan; Surkin, Marvin. Detroit: I Do Mind Dying: A Study in Urban Revolution. Foreword by Manning Marable.
- Hooks, Bell. Sisters of the Yam: Black Women and Self-Recovery.
- Hooks, Bell. Feminist Theory: From Margin to Center.
- Marable, Manning. How Capitalism Underdeveloped Black America: Problems in Race, Political Economy, and Society.
- Moraga, Cherríe. Loving in the War Years: Lo que nunca pasó por sus labios.
- Sklar, Holly. Trilateralism: The Trilateral Commission and Elite Planning for World Management. (1980) ISBN 0-89608-103-6, ISBN 0-89608-104-4, OCLC 6958001. 604 pages. Excerpts available online.
- Sklar, Holly. Washington's War on Nicaragua. (1988) ISBN 978-0896082953, ISBN 978-0896082960. 472 pages.
- Sklar, Holly. Streets of Hope: The Fall and Rise of an Urban Neighborhood. Co-authored with Peter Medoff. (1994) ISBN 978-0896085114. 221 pages.
- Sklar, Holly. Chaos Or Community?: Seeking Solutions, Not Scapegoats for Bad Economics. (1995) ISBN 978-0896085114. 221 pages.
- Sklar, Holly. Raise the Floor: Wages and Policies that Work for All of Us. Co-authored with Laryssa Mykyta and Susan Wefald. (2001) ISBN 978-0896086838. 262 pages.
- Tait, Vanessa. Poor Workers' Unions: Rebuilding Labor from Below.

== Book series ==
- INC Pamphlet (series) (jointly published with Institute for New Communications)
- PACCA Series on the Domestic Roots of U.S. Foreign Policy
- Race and Resistance
- Radical Sixties
- South End Pamphlet (series)
- South End Political Controversies Series
- South End Press Classics
