= Holly Sklar =

American journalist

- Born: 1955 (age 70–71); New York, New York
- Occupations: author, columnist, entrepreneur
- Notable work: Trilateralism: The Trilateral Commission and Elite Planning for World Management (1980)

Holly Sklar (born 1955) is an author and syndicated columnist for Z Magazine, a policy analyst, and strategist whose articles have appeared in hundreds of newspapers and online outlets including The Nation, The Philadelphia Inquirer, and USA Today.

== Biography ==
Sklar is the founder and CEO of Business For a Fair Minimum Wage, "a national network of business owners and executives who believe a fair minimum wage makes good business sense." She also serves on the board of directors of the American Sustainable Business Council.

From 1975 to 1976, Sklar lived and worked in an agricultural region of Bolivia. In 1978 she accepted an invitation to join the steering committee of the national conference taking place October that year, Women and Global Corporations: Work, Roles, and Resistance.

On October 13, 2000, Sklar spoke at the New Jersey Project's fall conference entitled Now You See It, Now You Don't: Class in America at Essex County College, Newark, New Jersey.

Sklar earned her Bachelor of Arts degree from Oberlin College and her Master of Arts degree from Columbia University.

== Writing ==
Sklar read several drafts of Right-wing Populism in America: Too Close for Comfort by Chip Berlet and Matthew N. Lyons in preparation for publishing.

== Works ==
=== Books ===
- Trilateralism: The Trilateral Commission and Elite Planning for World Management. Boston: South End Press (1980). ISBN 0896081036. OCLC 6958001. Excerpts.
- Washington's War on Nicaragua. Boston: South End Press (1988). ISBN 978-0896082953.
- Streets of Hope: The Fall and Rise of an Urban Neighborhood, with Peter Medoff. Boston: South End Press (1994). ISBN 978-0896085114.
- Chaos Or Community?: Seeking Solutions, Not Scapegoats for Bad Economics. Boston: South End Press (1995). ISBN 978-0896085114.
- Shifting Fortunes: The Perils of the Growing American Wealth Gap. Boston: United for a Fair Economy (1999). ISBN 978-0965924924.
- Raise the Floor: Wages and Policies that Work for All of Us, with Laryssa Mykyta & Susan Wefald. Boston: South End Press (2001). ISBN 978-0896086838.
- A Just Minimum Wage: Good for Workers, Business, and Our Future, with Rev. Paul H. Sherry. Philadelphia: American Friends Service Committee and the National Council of Churches USA (Oct. 2005). ISBN 0977182010.

=== Articles ===
- "Responses to Michael Massing: The U.S. Left and Nicaragua." The Nation (Apr. 20, 1985), p. 460.
- "Reading Nicaragua." The Nation (Sep. 7, 1985), pp. 185-192.
- "Out of Africa." The Nation (Jan. 25, 1986), p. 87.
- "Still Alive, Contadora Challenges Cold War." In These Times (Apr. 8, 1987), p. 17.
- "Rainbow Future." The Nation, vol. 248, no. 4 (Jan. 30, 1989), pp. 113–114.
- "The N.E.D.'s Ex-Nazi Adviser: Harbinger of Democracy?" (with Chip Berlet). The Nation (Apr. 2, 1990), pp. 450-457.
- "N.E.D., C.I.A., and the Orwellian Democracy Project" (with Chip Berlet). CovertAction Information Bulletin, no. 39 (Winter 1991), pp. 10–13. Full issue.
- "An Economic Bill of Rights." Earth Island Journal, vol. 11, no. 4 (Fall 1996), p. 39.
- "Titans of the Enron Economy: The Ten Habits Of Highly Defective Corporations." The Nation (Jul. 18, 2002).
- "Wall Street Has Already Voted." Z Magazine (Nov. 1, 2010).

=== Book contributions ===
- "Trilateralism: Managing Dependence and Democracy." In: Trilateralism: The Trilateral Commission and Elite Planning for World Management. Boston: South End Press (1980), pp. 1–58. ISBN 0896081036. OCLC 6958001.
- "Founding the Trilateral Commission: Chronology 1970-1977." In: Trilateralism: The Trilateral Commission and Elite Planning for World Management. Boston: South End Press (1980), pp. 76–82. ISBN 0896081036. OCLC 6958001.
- "The Commission's Purpose, Structure, and Programs: In Its Own Words." In: Trilateralism: The Trilateral Commission and Elite Planning for World Management. Boston: South End Press (1980), pp. 83–89. ISBN 0896081036. OCLC 6958001.
- "Who's Who on the Trilateral Commission." In: Trilateralism: The Trilateral Commission and Elite Planning for World Management. Boston: South End Press (1980), pp. 90–122. ISBN 0896081036. OCLC 6958001.
- "Trilateralism and the Management of Contradictions." In: Trilateralism: The Trilateral Commission and Elite Planning for World Management. Boston: South End Press (1980), pp. 555–586. ISBN 0896081036. OCLC 6958001.
- "Increasing the Minimum Wage Can Help the Working Poor." In: Poverty: Opposing Viewpoints, edited by Karen Balkin. San Diego, Calif.: Greenhaven Press (2004), pp. 126–129. ISBN 978-0737716986.
- "Imagine a Country." In: Race, Class, and Gender in the United States: An Integrated Study, by Paula Rothenberg. New York: Worth Publishers (2010), pp. 284–289.
- "Raising Minimum Wage Does Not Increase Unemployment." In: Unemployment, edited by David M. Haugen and Megan Susser. Detroit, Mich.: Greenhaven Press (2011), pp. 60–66. ISBN 978-0737752472.

=== Pamphlets ===
- Poverty in the American Dream: Women & Children First. INC Pamphlet, no. 1. New York: Institute for New Communications (1983). ISBN 978-0896081970. OCLC 10250764.
- Plant Closures: Myths, Realities, and Responses, no. 3. Boston: South End Press (1985). ISBN 978-0896082120. OCLC 12972734.
- Reagan, Trilateralism, and the Neoliberals: Containment and Intervention in the 1980s, no. 4. Boston: South End Press (1986). ISBN 978-0896082137. OCLC 13456393.
- Titans of the Enron Economy: The Ten Habits of Highly Defective Corporations, with Scott Klinger. Boston: United for a Fair Economy (Apr. 10, 2002).

=== Posters ===
- Who's Who in the Reagan Administration. Boston: South End Press (1981). OCLC 13688462.

=== Reports ===
- Jobs, Income, and Work: Ruinous Trends, Urgent Alternatives. Community Relations Division (Mar. 1995). ISBN 978-0910082297.

== Filmography ==
- Cold Warriors: The Trilateral Commission [Documentary] (1984).
- Holly Sklar on Wages and Work [Interview]. Bill Moyers Journal, PBS (Jun. 13, 2008).
  - Watch online. View transcript.
