= H. Bruce Franklin =

American cultural historian and scholar (1934–2024)

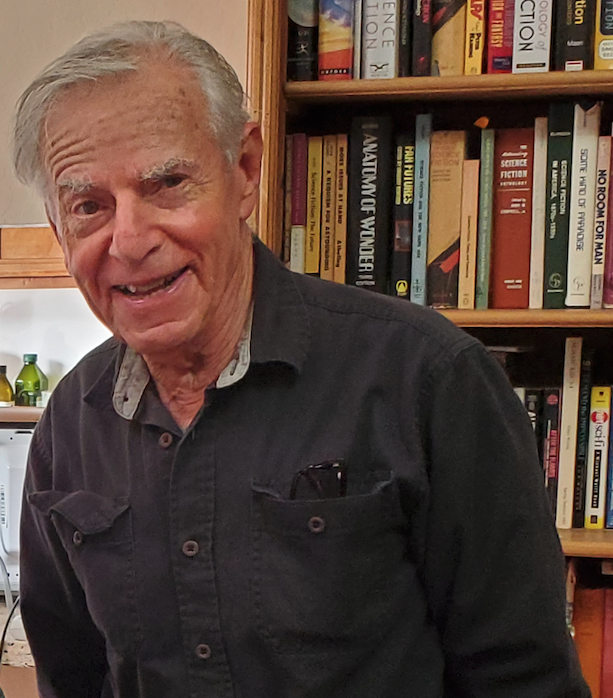
- Franklin in 2022
- Born: Howard Bruce Franklin; February 28, 1934; New York City, U.S.
- Died: May 19, 2024 (aged 90); El Cerrito, California, U.S.
- Occupation: Scholar
- Spouse: Jane Franklin (m. 1956; died 2023)
- Awards: Eaton Award, 1981; SFRA Pilgrim Award, 1983; SFRA Pioneer Award, 1991; Pearson-Bode Prize, 2008

Academic background
- Education: Amherst, B.A., 1955
- Alma mater: Stanford, Ph.D., 1961

Academic work
- Discipline: Cultural historian
- Institutions: Rutgers-Newark 1975–2015; Stanford 1961–1972

Howard Bruce Franklin (February 28, 1934 – May 19, 2024) was an American cultural historian, scholar, and left-wing activist. His main areas of academic focus were science fiction, prison literature, environmentalism, the Vietnam War and its aftermath, and American cultural history. He wrote or edited twenty books and three hundred professional articles and participated in making four films. He was instrumental in helping to debunk false public speculation that Vietnam was continuing to hold prisoners of war. He helped to establish science fiction writing as a genre worthy of serious academic study. In 2008, the American Studies Association awarded him the Pearson-Bode Prize for Lifetime Achievement in American Studies.

Born into a working-class family, Franklin worked his way through college and served in the US Air Force from 1956 to 1959. He was hired as a professor at Stanford University in 1961. A critic of the Vietnam War, he was one of the founding members of the Bay Area Revolutionary Union, heading its Palo Alto chapter. After a split within that group, he became a leader of the leftist organization Venceremos. Franklin was fired from Stanford University in January 1972 for allegedly inciting students to riot in connection with those activities, in a case which drew nationwide media attention. In December 1972 he and other members of Venceremos were arrested in connection with the escape from prison two months earlier of Ronald Beaty, in which one guard was killed. Charges against Franklin were ultimately dropped.

Franklin became a tenured full professor of English and American Studies at Rutgers University–Newark in 1975. He also held the John Cotton Dana endowed chair at the institution from 1987 until retiring in 2015. Thereafter, he retained the title of professor emeritus.

== Early life ==
Born to a working-class family in Brooklyn on February 28, 1934, Franklin held numerous jobs while working his way through college. From 1951 to 1952, he was a batch worker at the Mayfair Photofinishing Company. In 1953, he was an upholsterer for the Carb Manufacturing Company, and in 1954 was promoted to foreman of the shipping department. He graduated summa cum laude from Amherst College in 1955 as a member of Phi Beta Kappa.

In 1956, he married Jane Morgan, a graduate of Duke University. They had three children together and were married until her death in 2023.

From 1955 to 1956, he was a tugboat deckhand and mate for the Pennsylvania RR Marine department, based in Jersey City, New Jersey. He served in the United States Air Force from 1956 to 1959 as a navigator and intelligence officer. In 1966, he resigned his commission in the Air Force Reserve as a protest against the Vietnam War.

== Stanford years ==
Franklin earned his doctorate from Stanford University in 1961. He was hired that year at the university as an assistant professor of English; he was promoted to associate professor in 1965. He was also a lecturer in San Jose, California's municipal adult education department from 1963 to 1964.

He became an expert on American writers, particularly Herman Melville and Nathaniel Hawthorne. At one point, he served as president of the Melville Society. His first book, The Wake of the Gods: Melville's Mythology, examined Melville's use of mythologies and intellectual milieu from Meso-American to Sanskrit. Franklin wrote a scholarly edition of Melville's The Confidence Man: His Masquerade, which traced obscure classical and "alien" references embedded in Melville's prose.

Franklin and his family spent a year in France from 1966 to 1967. He taught for six months at Stanford's campus in Tours, France, and then moved in Paris. There he and his wife Jane studied Marxist theory, helped organize the Free University of Paris, and participated in setting up the European network of GI deserters, who were primarily young men opposed to the Vietnam War. When he returned to the United States in the late 1960s, he became a prominent activist in the movement against the Vietnam War.

=== Maoism, Revolutionary Union, and Venceremos ===
In 1968, Franklin was one of twenty-four founders of the Revolutionary Union. After Franklin left the RU, the organization became the Revolutionary Communist Party.

The organization was infiltrated by the FBI, which planted informers within the leadership of the group to heighten members' "suspicions of each other". Detailed information about this period and the FBI's attempts to "neutralize" (their word) Franklin can be found in the thousands of pages which he later collected under the Freedom of Information Act (FOIA). He donated this material to the Bancroft Library. Doctrinal differences soon emerged between followers of Franklin and followers of Robert Avakian over revolutionary strategy.

In a matter of months Franklin, along with roughly half of RU's members, left to join a Chicano-based leftist group in Palo Alto called Venceremos. Some of its members were active in prisoner outreach programs.

=== Termination from Stanford ===
At Stanford, in 1971, Franklin was accused of inciting anti-war protests on campus. At a campus rally on February 10, Franklin made a speech protesting a war effort by the United States during the Vietnam War to invade the neighboring nation of Laos. According to the testimony of one witness, Franklin urged students assembled at the rally to disrupt university functions by shutting down its computer facility.

Franklin concluded his speech at that rally by saying:

See, now what we're asking is for people to make that little tiny gesture to show that we're willing to inconvenience ourselves a little bit and to begin to shut down the most obvious machinery of war, such as, and I think it is a good target, that Computation Center.

A report in The Stanford Daily student publication suggested that Franklin urged protestors to "resist police efforts" with the effect of "inciting a riot". After his speech, students occupied the Stanford computer center, and more than 100 riot police were summoned.

Stanford president Richard Lyman gave Franklin a letter, claiming that he violated an agreement entitled "Statement of Policy on Appointments and Tenure", with the specific complaint that Franklin "deliberately contributed to a disturbance which forced the cancellation of a speech by Ambassador Henry Cabot Lodge at Dinkelspiel Auditorium". A tenure-review committee was chosen, with professors from assorted academic departments. A lecture hall was converted into a makeshift courtroom. Stanford hired a major Los Angeles law firm, with lead attorney Paul Valentine, to argue the university's case, while Franklin, lacking funds as he was unemployed, had to defend himself with advice from a law student. Evidence was heard, witnesses were cross-examined, summations were given, and the panel left to consider its verdict.

Franklin was found guilty of three charges of "inciting student disruptions". Accordingly, Stanford fired Franklin in January 1972. He was the only tenured professor to be fired from Stanford. The termination generated nationwide media exposure and brought attention to the issue of academic freedom and freedom of speech.

For a period, he continued to be active with Venceremos, and in December 1972 was arrested on charges of harboring Ronald Beaty, a federal fugitive. Other Venceremos members had helped Beaty escape during a transfer to court, killing one prison guard and wounding another in the process. At the time of his arrest Franklin praised Beaty's escape as a revolutionary act but denied involvement. Beaty was recaptured a month later. Charges against Franklin were ultimately dropped, but other members of Venceremos were tried and convicted in connection with this crime, and the group dissolved soon after.

After being terminated from Stanford, Franklin was out of work for the next three years. Blacklisted, Franklin did not have regular employment during these years, although he had brief visiting faculty positions at Wesleyan and Yale universities from 1974 to 1975.

A decade later, in 1985, with the help of a lawyer from the American Civil Liberties Union, Franklin appealed the termination, and sought back pay, damages, and reinstatement, but the effort was not successful. A state court upheld Stanford's ruling, and the California Supreme Court refused to hear the case. ACLU lawyer Margaret Casey said the ruling would have a "chilling effect" on the power of academics to express their thinking freely.

== Rutgers years ==
In 1975, Franklin was hired by Rutgers University–Newark as a full professor with tenure. In 1987, he was appointed as the John Cotton Dana Professor of English and American Studies, a title he retained until his retirement in 2015. Franklin's academic career has diverse areas of scrutiny, which relate mostly to the topic of American cultural history. In 2014, he was influential in organizing Rutgers faculty to block the choice of former United States Secretary of State Condoleezza Rice as commencement speaker: Franklin's political views softened in later life.

In 2014, Temple University scholar Carolyn Karcher summed up Franklin's achievements by saying that he has an "extraordinary gift for teaching us to read our history in our literature and to glean from both insights that can help us alter our future." Franklin retired in 2016.

=== Science fiction ===
Franklin had a lifelong passion for science fiction and has been a guest curator on topics about Star Trek and Star Wars. His book War Stars was cited by leftist philosopher and linguist Noam Chomsky, who bemoaned the prevalence of a recurring theme in popular literature that "we're about to face destruction from some terrible, awesome enemy." Franklin's research explored America's fascination with superweapons. He argued in War Stars: The Superweapon and the American Imagination that popular American books and novels in preceding decades and centuries, which dealt with the themes of superweapons, may have helped to shape national thinking on this subject. When the movie Independence Day appeared in 1996, Franklin said "Fundamental to the historical experience of [American] culture are alien invaders who came armed with a superior technology and wiped out the culture that was here." His book Future Perfect: American Science Fiction of the Nineteenth Century (1966) identified American authors including Washington Irving, Edgar Allan Poe, Nathaniel Hawthorne and Herman Melville as pioneers of this genre who wrote science fiction, contrary to popular understanding. His Robert A. Heinlein: America as Science Fiction won the Eaton Award in 1981, and contributed to Franklin receiving the Pilgrim Award for lifetime scholarship in 1983. In his 1988 War Stars: The Superweapon and the American Imagination selected by Choice as the Outstanding Academic Book of 1989, Franklin turned his interest in science fiction to an examination of the American fascination with superweapons. His book presents a view that, ironically, from Robert Fulton's submarine Nautilus in the 18th century to the death-dealing weaponry of the late 20th century, superweapons ostensibly designed to end war have proved capable of exterminating the human species. The expanded 2008 edition explores how this cultural history led to the seemingly permanent state of warfare of the 21st century. War Stars is informed by Franklin's own earlier experience as a navigator and intelligence officer in the Strategic Air Command. In 1990 he was named the Distinguished Scholar for the International Association for the Fantastic in the Arts. In 1991, he was Guest Curator for the Star Trek and the Sixties exhibit at the National Air and Space Museum of the Smithsonian Institution; this show subsequently traveled to the Hayden Planetarium.

=== Vietnam and its aftermath ===
A recurring subject area for Franklin was the history of the Vietnam War and its role in American literature and culture since 1966. His books M.I.A., or Mythmaking in America and Vietnam and America: A Documented History (which he co-edited) have been used in courses on the Vietnam War. His Vietnam and Other American Fantasies (2000) synthesized his previous work and extended it into an overview of 21st-century American culture.

One of Franklin's themes in writing about Vietnam is that the supposed existence of surviving American prisoners of war in Vietnam after the war was a myth created after 1980 with the tacit approval of the Reagan administration, and that the psychological foundations of the myth arguably originated from justifications for the war offered by the Nixon administration before 1973, in that the war had to continue in order to bring the prisoners of war home. In the 1980s and 1990s, many Americans believed, incorrectly, that there were many "prisoners of war are still being held in Indochina" and that the American government was lying to the public about their existence. When Franklin was assembling an anthology in 1996 entitled The Vietnam War in American Stories, Songs and Poems, he sent a fax to musician Bruce Springsteen requesting the singer's permission to put the song Born in the U.S.A. in his anthology; he faxed the request en route to class, and Springsteen's office faxed back, agreeing, letting him use the image without charge. His book Vietnam and America: A Documented History, which he co-edited with his wife Jane Franklin and Marvin Gettleman and Marilyn Young, was described by The New York Times as a "valuable anthology of crucial texts and records" which "tersely replays the bitter conflict." A reviewer in The Nation described Franklin's writing about the M.I.A. issue as using "elegant economy". Franklin believed that his students had incorrect ideas about the American involvement in Vietnam, such as that the United States lost the war because it "didn't try hard enough"; Franklin felt that his students were unaware of the extent of bomb damage. His book chronicled how the supposed "missing" American soldiers were "known to be dead" but were "kept alive for bureaucratic reasons that backfired." He described the post-war belief in still-held prisoners of war as a "manufactured issue" and criticized presidential contender Michele Bachmann for bringing up the issue as "pure opportunism." Franklin was pivotal in helping to debunk the "Missing in Action" myths. New York Times reviewer Todd Gitlin described Franklin's M.I.A. as "meticulously researched."

In 2018, at the age of 85, Franklin published Crash Course: From the Good War to the Forever War, a history of America from the 1930s to the present, in the form of a memoir. The book takes us from the consciousness of a kid growing up during World War II, through his work as a tugboat mate on the New York waterfront during the murderous gang wars, his experience at a Strategic Air Command navigator and intelligence officer, and his subsequent decades of activism for peace and justice.

=== Environmentalism ===
Franklin's research about menhaden, a fish crucial in the food chain of the Atlantic and Gulf coasts, helped spark a mass movement to protect them. In The Most Important Fish in the Sea, Franklin examined marine food chains and argued for the importance of menhaden. He showed that many species of fish, which humans eat, depend for their well-being on eating menhaden, and therefore their role in the food chain was vital. Franklin's analysis was an interdisciplinary study in American environmental, economic, social, political, and cultural history from the 17th into the 21st centuries. It led to the introduction of two nature conservation bills in Congress. In a review in The Washington Post, his book was described as an "exhaustive examination of issues" using lucid prose "infused with an urgency that depends little on hyperbole and largely on careful documentation". The book played a leading role in restoring whales to New York and New Jersey waters, and also in persuading the Department of Commerce in 2020 to act to protect menhaden.

=== Prisoners and prisons ===
A major focus of Franklin's research has been the American penal system. Prison Literature in America: The Victim as Criminal and Artist (1989) established Franklin as an authority on American prison literature and has been cited by historians, penologists, literary critics, and sociologists. In books such as his 1998 anthology Prison Writing in 20th-Century America and Prison Literature in America, Franklin argued that convict authors and artists are "innovative creators who have had a deep influence on the mainstream of cultural production", according to the Los Angeles Times. His work was cited in the Supreme Court's decision to overturn New York State's Son of Sam law. He has been an outspoken critic of the American penal system, in terms of violations of human rights. His anthology Prison Writing in 20th-Century America about "criminals turned raconteurs" has been called the best anthology of the genre.

The typical American prison is designed and run to maximize degradation, brutalization, and punishment, overt torture is the norm. Beatings, electric shock, prolonged exposure to heat and even immersion in scalding water, shackled prisoners forced to lie in their own excrement for hours or even days, sodomy with riot batons, nightsticks, flashlights, and broom handles, months, years, even decades of solitary confinement in windowless cells, rape and murder by guards or prisoners instructed by guards—all are everyday occurrences in the American prison system .... Sexual humiliation is the norm, and rape is endemic .... the huge cost of prisons is diverting funds from education and rebuilding America's crumbling infrastructure.

— H. Bruce Franklin, 2015

== Death ==
Franklin died from corticobasal degeneration at his home in El Cerrito, California, on May 19, 2024, at the age of 90.

== Books ==
- The Wake of the Gods: Melville's Mythology (Stanford University Press, 1963)
- Future Perfect: American Science Fiction of the 19th Century (Oxford University Press, 1966; Revised and Expanded Edition, Rutgers University Press, 1995)
- From the Movement Toward Revolution (Van Nostrand Reinhold Co., 1971)
- The Essential Stalin: Major Theoretical Writings, 1905-52 (Anchor Books, 1972)
- Back Where You Came From: A Life in the Death of the Empire (Harper's Magazine Press, 1975)
- Prison Literature in America: The Victim as Criminal and Artist (Oxford University Press, 1978; Revised and expanded edition, 1989)
- Robert A. Heinlein: America as Science Fiction (Oxford University Press, 1980)
- American Prisoners and Ex-prisoners, Their Writings: An Annotated Bibliography of Published Works, 1798-1981 (L. Hill, 1982)
- Countdown to Midnight: Twelve Great Stories about Nuclear War (DAW Books, 1984)
- Vietnam and America: A Documented History (co-author)(Grove/Atlantic, 1985)
- War Stars: The Superweapon in the American Imagination (Oxford University Press, 1988). Revised and Expanded Edition, University of Massachusetts Press, 2008.
- M.I.A., or, Mythmaking in America, New York: Lawrence Hill and Co., 1992. Revised and expanded paperback edition, New Brunswick, New Jersey: Rutgers University Press, 1993. ISBN 0-8135-2001-0
- The Vietnam War in American Stories, Songs, and Poems (Bedford/St. Martins, 1996)
- Prison Writing in 20th-Century America (Penguin, 1998)
- Vietnam & Other American Fantasies (University of Massachusetts Press, 2001)
- The Most Important Fish in the Sea: Menhaden and America (Island Press/Shearwater Books, 2007)
- Star Trek and History, edited by Nancy R. Reagin (Chapter 6: "Vietnam, Star Trek, and the Real Future"; Wiley, 2013)
- Crash Course: From the Good War to the Forever War (Rutgers University Press, 2018)
