= Sigrid Lotfi =

German-born Iranian translator (1921–2014)

Sigrid Lotfi (born Sigrid Gogarten; 28 July 1921 – 29 September 2014) was a German-born Iranian translator and writer. She is known for translating works of contemporary Persian literature into German. Lotfi played a significant role in introducing modern Iranian fiction to German-speaking audiences.

== Life and career ==
Sigrid Gogarten was born on 28 July 1921, in Germany. She held a doctorate in Russian language and literature from the University of Göttingen, in Göttingen, Germany. She was married in the 1950s to Mohammad Hassan Lotfi Tabrizi (1919–1999), a noted Iranian translator of the works of Plato and Plotinus. Lotfi lived in Iran for over 60 years.

== Books translated ==
- Dowlatabadi, Mahmoud (1 January 1996). Der leere Platz von Ssolutsch [The Empty Square of Soluch] (in German). Sigrid Lotfi (translator). Taschenbuch. ISBN 9783293200814.
- Dowlatabadi, Mahmoud (1 January 2017). Kelidar (in German). Sigrid Lotfi (translator). Unionsverlag. ISBN 9783293207844.; first translated in 1999 by Lotfi
