= Prison literature =

Literary genre

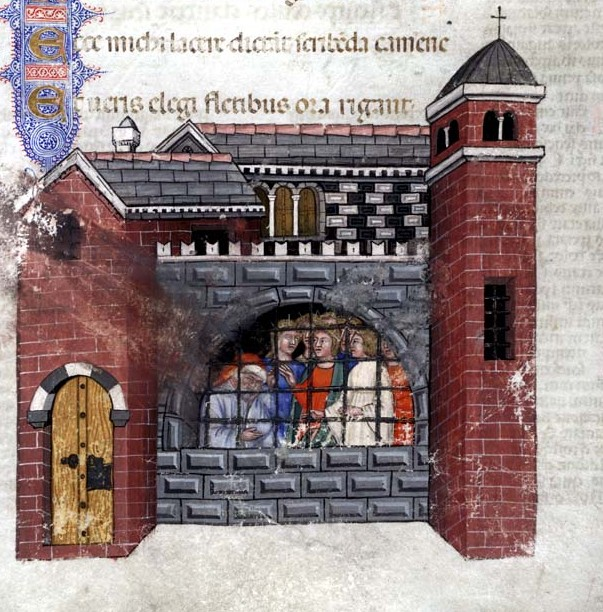
The Roman philosopher Boethius wrote The Consolation of Philosophy in 524 AD (image from a 1385 manuscript) while imprisoned.

Prison literature is the literary genre of works written by an author in unwilling confinement, such as a prison, jail or house arrest. The writing can be about prison, informed by it, or simply incidentally written while in prison. It could be a memoir, nonfiction, or fiction.

== Examples of prison literature ==
Boethius's Consolation of Philosophy (524 AD) has been described as "by far the most interesting example of prison literature the world has ever seen."

Marco Polo found time to dictate a detailed account of his travels to China, The Travels of Marco Polo, to a fellow inmate whilst he was imprisoned in Genoa from 1298 to 1299. Dante Alighieri wrote the Divine Comedy in exile, far away from his beloved home town of Florence, which he was not allowed to enter again after 1301. Sir Thomas Malory likely wrote Le Morte d'Arthur while being an imprisoned knight as described by himself.

Martin Luther translated the New Testament from Koine Greek into German and also wrote Against Latomus and a number of other texts, whilst hiding, with an assumed identity, from the pope at Wartburg Castle between 1521 and 1522.

Miguel de Cervantes was held captive by Barbary pirates as a galley slave in Algiers between 1575 and 1580, and from this experience he drew inspiration for his novel Don Quixote.

Sir Walter Raleigh compiled his History of the World, Volume 1 in a prison chamber in the Tower of London between 1603 and 1612. Hugo Grotius wrote his commentary on St. Matthew while in prison (1618–21), from which he escaped while hidden in a chest of books. It was while Galileo Galilei was under house arrest that he dedicated his time to one of his finest works, Two New Sciences.

Raimondo Montecuccoli wrote his aphorisms on the art of war in a Stettin prison (c. 1639–1641). John Bunyan wrote The Pilgrim's Progress (1678) while in jail. Marquis de Sade wrote prolifically during an 11-year period in the Bastille, churning out 11 novels, 16 novellas, two volumes of essays, a diary and 20 plays. Napoleon Bonaparte dictated his memoir while imprisoned on St. Helena island; it would become one of the best sellers of the 19th century. Fyodor Dostoevsky spent four years of hard labor in a Siberian prison camp for his membership in a liberal intellectual group from which he produced the autobiographical novel The House of the Dead; it was one of the first books to inform Russians about life inside an exile labor camp. O. Henry (William Sidney Porter) wrote 14 stories while in prison for embezzlement between 1898 and 1901, and it was during this time that his pseudonym "O. Henry" began to stick. Oscar Wilde wrote the philosophical essay De Profundis while he was in Reading Gaol on charges of "unnatural acts" and "gross indecency" with other men. The Indian independence activist Bal Gangadhar Tilak, wrote the Gita Rahasya, an analysis of Karma yoga, whilst in prison at Mandalay, Burma. E. E. Cummings 1922 autobiographical novel The Enormous Room was written while he was imprisoned by the French during World War I on the charge of expressing anti-war sentiments in private letters home. Adolf Hitler wrote his autobiographical and political ideology book Mein Kampf while he was imprisoned after the Beer Hall Putsch in November 1923. The Italian Marxist theorist Antonio Gramsci wrote much of his work while imprisoned by the fascist government of Mussolini during the 1930s; this was later published as Prison Notebooks, and contained his influential theory of cultural hegemony. Jawaharlal Nehru wrote the letters that were later published as Glimpses of World History whilst being in prison between 1930 and 1933.

Fernand Braudel wrote The Mediterranean and the Mediterranean World in the Age of Philip II whilst being held at a POW camp near Lübeck, Germany, until the end of WWII.

In 1942, Jean Genet wrote his first novel Our Lady of the Flowers while in prison near Paris, scrawled on scraps of paper. Dietrich Bonhoeffer wrote Letters and Papers from Prison whilst at Tegel Prison in 1943. Nigerian author Ken Saro-Wiwa was executed while in prison, and wrote Sozaboy, about a young naïve imprisoned soldier.

Iranian author Mahmoud Dowlatabadi wrote the 500-page Missing Soluch while imprisoned without pen or paper, entirely in his head, then copied it down within 70 days after his release. Albert Speer wrote his two memoirs Inside the Third Reich and Spandau: The Secret Diaries while incarcerated at Spandau prison.

The Soviet author Aleksandr Solzhenitsyn writings are informed by his periods of imprisonment. He won the Nobel Prize in 1970. Letter from Birmingham Jail is an open letter by Martin Luther King Jr. written in 1963 from City Jail, Birmingham, Alabama. Soul on Ice is a memoir and collection of essays by Eldridge Cleaver, written in Folsom State Prison in 1965. Behrouz Boochani authored No Friend But the Mountains (2018) by using a mobile phone to send thousands of text messages during his incarceration by the Australian government on Manus Island.

A number of postcolonial texts are based on the author's experiences in prison. Nigerian author Chris Abani’s book of poetry Kalakuta Republic is based on his experiences in prison. Pramoedya Ananta Toer wrote the Buru Quartet while in prison in Indonesia. Kenyan author Ngũgĩ wa Thiong'o's prison diary titled Detained: A Prisoner's Diary was published in 1981. Nelson Mandela's Long Walk to Freedom (1994) is about his 28-years of prison, from which he was released in 1990.

Some examples of female prison writers include Madame Roland (Paris, 1793), Krystyna Wituska (Berlin, 1942-44), Nawal El Saadawi (Egypt, 1981), Joan Henry (England, 1951), Caesarina Kona Makhoere (South Africa, 1976-82), Vera Figner (Russia, 1883–1904), Béatrice Saubin (Malaysia, 1992-90), Precious Bedell (New York, 1980-99), and Lady Constance Lytton (England, 1910).

== American prison literature ==
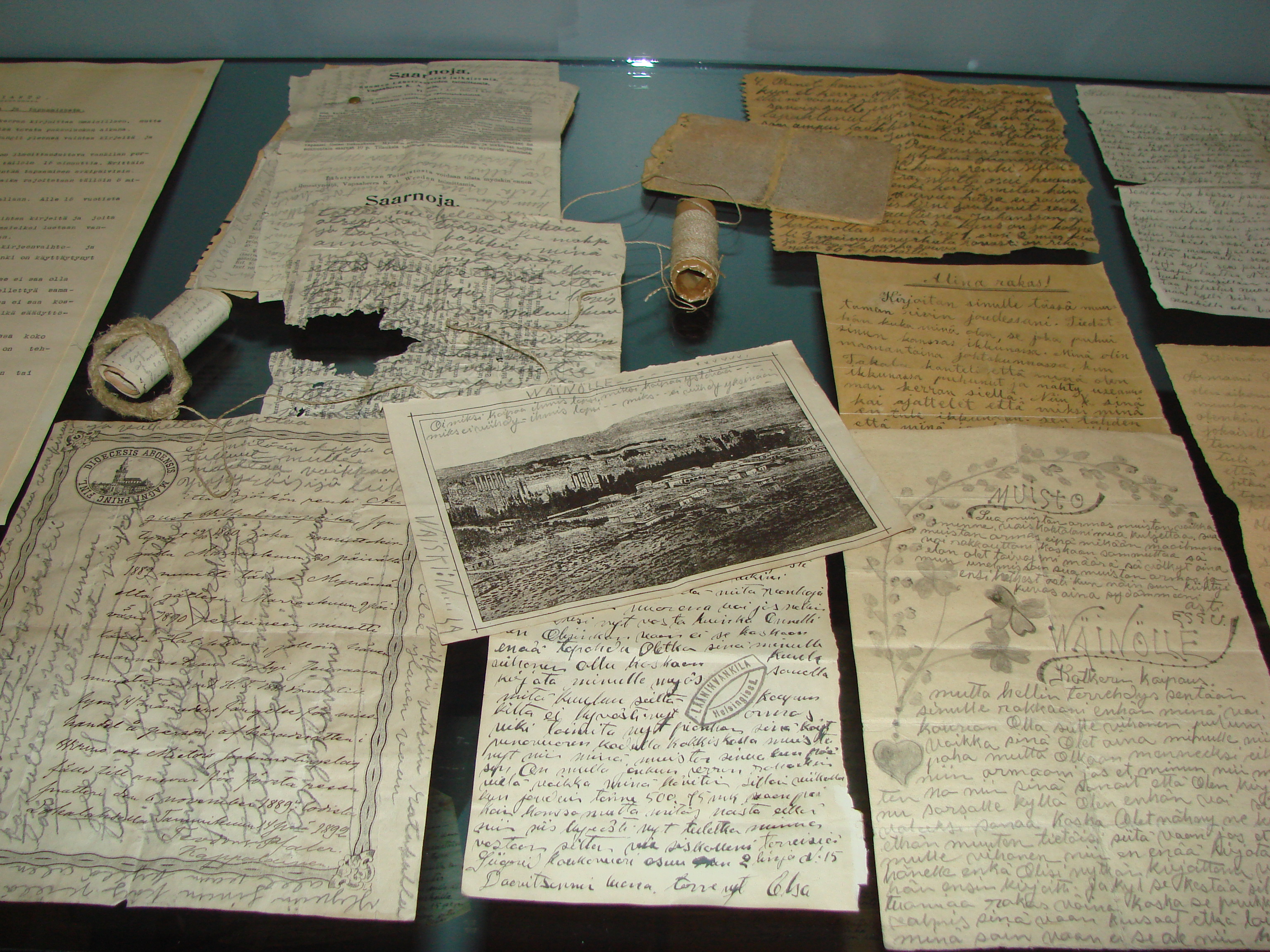
Letters and poetry written by Finnish prisoners at the Hämeenlinna prison.

Twentieth century United States brought about many pieces of prison literature. Some examples of such pieces are My Life in Prison by Donald Lowrie, Prison Days and Nights by Victor Folke Nelson, In for Life by Tom Runyon, Cell Mates by Agnes Smedley, Crime and Criminals by Kate Richards O'Hare, Sing Soft, Sing Loud by Patricia McConnel, and AIDS: The View from a Prison Cell by Dannie Martin. Some other 20th-century prison writers include Jim Tully, Ernest Booth, Chester Himes, Nelson Algren, Robert Lowell, George Jackson, Jimmy Santiago Baca, and Kathy Boudin. Incarcerated authors of the 21st century, such as Arthur Longworth, author of Zek: An American Prison Story, have continued this tradition.

Prison literature written in the United States is of particular interest to some scholars who point out that pieces which reveal the brutality of life behind bars pose an interesting question about American society: "Can these things really happen in prosperous, freedom-loving America?" Since the United States is globally reputed as being a “democratic haven” and the “land of freedom,” writings that come out of American prisons can potentially present a challenge to popularly held mythologized impressions about the country's founding principles. Jack London, a famous American writer who was incarcerated for 30 days in the Erie County Penitentiary, is an example of such a challenger; in his memoir "Pinched": A Prison Experience he recalls how he was automatically sentenced to 30 days in prison with no chance to defend himself or even plead innocent or guilty. While sitting in the courtroom he thought to himself, "Behind me were the many generations of my American ancestry. One of the kinds of liberty those ancestors of mine fought and died for was the right of trial by jury. This was my heritage, stained sacred by their blood…" London's "sacred heritage" made no difference, however. It is stories such as London's that make American prison literature a common and popular subtopic of the broader genre of literature.

For readers of American prison memoirs, it means getting a glimpse into a world they would never otherwise experience. As Tom Wicker puts it, "They disclose the nasty, brutish details of the life within – a life the authorities would rather we not know about, a life so far from conventional existence that the accounts of those who experience it exert the fascination of the unknown, sometimes the unbelievable.” He also notes that “what happens inside the walls inevitably reflects the society outside." So not only do readers acquire a sense of the world inside the walls, gaining insight into the thoughts and feelings of prisoners; they also gain a clearer vision of the society which exists outside the prison walls and how it treats and affects those whom they place within. D. Quentin Miller described prison literature as a "fascinating glimmer of humanity persisting in circumstances that conspire, with overwhelming force, to obliterate it."

== See also ==
- Books to Prisoners

"Imprisonment of the Learned"
by Isaac D'Israeli, 1791
00:07:32 (text)

- Category:Prison writings
- Category:Memoirs of imprisonment
- Prison art
- Prison library
- Prison literacy
- Prison newspaper
- Rehabilitation (penology)
