= Shahriar Mandanipour =

Iranian writer

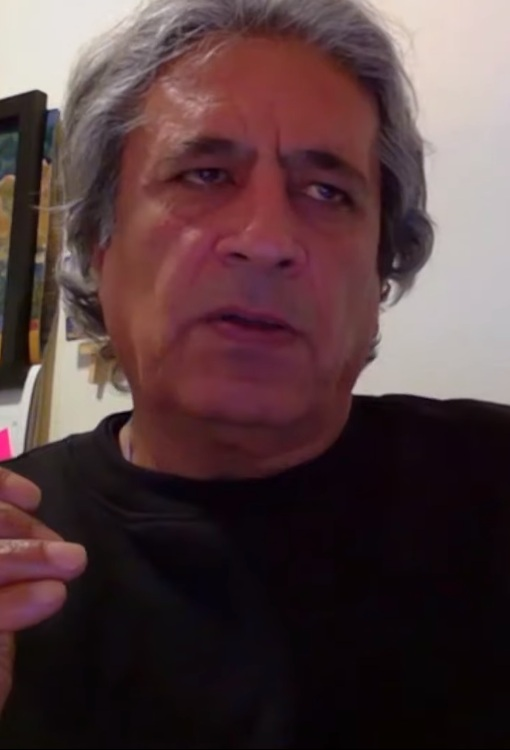
Shahriar Mandanipour in 2021

Shahriar Mandanipour (Persian: شهریار مندنی پور; also Shahriar Mondanipour (born February 15, 1957) is an Iranian writer, journalist and literary theorist.

Mandanipour was born and raised in Shiraz, Iran. In 1975 he moved to Tehran and studied Political Sciences at the University of Tehran, graduating in 1980. In 1981, he enlisted in the army for his military service. To experience war and to write about it, he volunteered to join the front during the Iran-Iraq war and served there as an officer for eighteen months.

Following his military service, Mandanipour returned to Shiraz, where he worked as director of the Hafiz Research Center and National Library of Fars. In 1998, he became chief editor of Asr-e Panjshanbeh (Thursday Evening), a monthly literary journal.

In 2006, Mandanipour traveled to the United States as an International Writers Project Fellow at Brown University. In 2007 and 2008, he was a writer in residence at Harvard University and in 2009 at Boston College. In September 2011, Mandanipour returned to Brown University as a visiting literary arts professor, teaching contemporary Persian literature and modern Iranian cinema. He is now a Professor of Practice at Tufts University.

== Works ==
Mandanipour started writing at fourteen and published his first short story, Shadows of the Cave, in 1985 in the literary journal Mofid Magazine. In 1989, his first collection of short stories was published under the same title.

Regarded as a writer of contemporary Iranian literature, Mandanipour utlizes a creative approach to the use of symbols and metaphors, experimentation with language, time, and space, as well as an awareness of sequence and identity. In his stories, Mandanipour creates a surreal world in which illusion is as natural as terrifying reality. The nightmares and realism of his stories are rooted in the historical horrors and sufferings of the people of Iran.

At the outset, Mandanipour's characters do not conform to conventional molds. Traditional identities are blurred as the lines between right and wrong become thin. Characters are also often driven by the most basic human instincts of fear, survival, and loneliness, Mandanipour's characters often struggle in a world of contradictions and ambiguities with everyday-life.

In a collection of essays on creative writing, The Book of Shahrzad's Ghosts (Ketab-e Arvāh-e Shahrzād), Mandanipour discusses the elements of the story and the novel, as well as his theories on the nature of literature and the secrets of fiction. He writes, "Literature is the alchemy of transforming reality into words and creating a new phenomenon called fictional reality."

His novel The Courage of Love (Del-e Del Dadegi), published in 1998, is structured around a love quadrangle with the four main characters representing earth, fire, water, and wind. The novel's events occur during two different periods of war and earthquakes. Mandanipour compares the devastation, savagery, futility, and dark consequences of war and earthquakes by placing the two timeframes laterally, like mirrors facing each other. In the novel, Mandanipour employs a stream of consciousness. Numerous critics, including Houshang Golshiri, have regarded the 900-page work of fiction as a masterpiece of contemporary Iranian literature. In 2008, he cooperated in writing the screenplay of a documentary named Chahar Marge Yek Nevisandeh (Four Deaths of a Writer). It is about the life of a writer showing how he dies four times in his works, and the screenplay was directed by Ali Zare Ghanat Nowi.

In 2009, Mandanipour published Censoring an Iranian Love Story, his first novel to be translated into English. Ostensibly a tale of romance, the book delves deeply into themes of censorship as the author struggles, in the text, with writing a love story that he'll be able to get past Iran's Ministry of Culture and Islamic Guidance's Office of Censorship to publish an account of life in post-Islamic Revolution Iran.

In the novel, two narratives are intertwined. In one, we read of the difficulties, fears, and trepidations that surround the meeting of a young couple in modern-day Iran at a time when gender separation is forcefully imposed on society. Scene by scene, we become more familiar with their struggles to preserve their love and their creative schemes to lessen the risk of discovery and arrest. In a parallel storyline, Mandanipour enters as his alter ego and takes us along as he composes each sentence and scene, revealing his frustrations and his methods of battling against censorship. The penalties that the writer self-censors appear as strikethroughs in the text. The writer's comical efforts at surmounting censorship and advancing his story resemble the struggles of the young lovers to preserve their love.

Translated into English by Sara Khalili, Censoring an Iranian Love Story was well received by critics worldwide. The New Yorker named it one of the Reviewers' favorites from 2009, and National Public Radio listed it as one of The Best Debut Fictions of 2009.

In his review for The New Yorker, James Wood wrote, "Mandanipour's writing is exuberant, bonhomous, clever, profuse with puns and literary-political references."[2] For The New York Times, Michiko Kakutani wrote, "Some of Mr. Mandanipour's efforts to inject his story with surreal, postmodern elements feel distinctly strained (the intermittent appearances of a hunchbacked midget, in particular, are annoyingly gratuitous and contrived), but he's managed, by the end of the book, to build a clever Rubik's Cube of a story, while at the same time giving readers a haunting portrait of life in the Islamic Republic of Iran: arduous, demoralizing and constricted even before the brutalities of the current crackdown." And writing in the Los Angeles Times, Susan Salter Reynolds commented, "Censorship, seen as its art form, is just another way of messing with reality. It's hard enough to generate ideas without someone else's superimposed over them. Still, the fictional Mandanipour tries ... He writes a love story that is convincingly, achingly impossible in a place where men and women cannot even look at each other in public. The effect (as every good Victorian understood) is deliriously sensual prose."

== Awards ==
In 1994, Mandanipour was named Best Film Critique at the Press Festival in Tehran. In 1998, he received the Golden Tablet Award for best fiction in Iran for the past 20 years. In 2004, he won the Mehregan Award for the best Iranian children's novel. In 2010, he was awarded The Athens Prize for Literature for his novel Censoring an Iranian Love Story.

== Bibliography ==
- Censoring an Iranian Love Story, Alfred A. Knopf, Random House, 2009. (Translated and published in Italian, French, Dutch, German, Portuguese, Spanish, Catalan, Polish, Greek, and Korean.)
- Moon Brow, Restless Books, 2018.
- Seasons of Purgatory, Bellevue Literary Press, January 2022.

Published in Iran (in Persian):

- One Thousand and One Years, Afarinegan Publishing, Tehran, 2nd ed., 2004 (book for young adults)
- Ultramarine Blue, Nashr-e Markaz Publishing, Tehran, 2003; 4th ed., 2007
- Violet Orient, Nashr-e Markaz Publishing, Tehran, 1999; 8th ed., 2009
- The Courage of Love (2 vol.), Zaryab Publications, Tehran, 1998; 2nd ed., 2000
- The Shadows of the Cave, Navid Publications, Shiraz, 1989; 2nd ed., Hamrah Publications, Tehran, 2001
- The Secret, Soroosh Press, Tehran, 1997; 2nd ed., 2000 (children's book)
- Midday Moon, Nashr-e Markaz Publishing, Tehran, 1997; 2nd ed., 2003; 5th ed., 2009
- Mummy and Honey, Niloofar Publications, Tehran, 1997; 2nd ed., 2001
- The Eighth Day of the Earth, Niloofar Publications, Tehran, 1992
- The Book of Shahrzad's Ghost (essays on creative writing), Qoqnoos Publishing, Tehran, 2004; 2nd ed., 2005

Short stories in translation published in literary journals:

- "Mummy and Honey," Words without Borders, November 2010
- "If You Didn't Kill the Cuckoo Bird," The Virginia Quarterly Review, Summer 2010
- "Seven Captains," The Kenyon Review, Summer 2009
- "Seasons of Purgatory," The Literary Review, Fall 2007

Several short stories have also been translated into French, German, Kurdish, and Arabic.

Short stories in translation published in anthologies:

- "The Color of Fire at Midday", Sohrab's Wars, Mazda Publishers, Inc., 2008
- "Shatter the Stone Tooth", Strange Times, My Dear: The PEN Anthology of Contemporary Iranian Literature, Arcade Publishing, 2005
- "Kolacja cyprysu i ognia", (Dinner of the Cypress and Fire) Kolacja cyprysu i ognia. Współczesne opowiadania irańskie, selected and rendered into Polish by Ivonna Nowicka, Krajowa Agencja Wydawnicza, Warszawa, 2003
- Berliner Träume/Auszug aus dem Berliner Tagebuch, Zwischen Berlin und Beirut (anthology), Verlag C.H.Beck, Munchen, 2007
- Neue Literatur aus dem Iran, Haus der Kulturen der Welt (The House of World Culture), Berlin, 2000
- "Le Huitième Jour de la terre", Les Jardins de Solitude, Editions Mille et Une Nuits, Department de la Librairie Arthem, Fayard, Paris, Nov. 2000
- Naqd, Tidsskrift for Mellemθstens Litteratur, Copenhagen, 1998

Essays:

- "Le jour ou le printemps iranien refleurira," Le Temp, Switzerland, April 2011
- "Das Kapital," Bound to Last (a collection of essays,) Da Capo Press, 2010
- "In Iran Today, Generation Must Speak to Generation," Guardian, 2009
- "The Life of a Word," PEN America: A Journal for Writers and Readers /8 Making Histories, New York 2008

== See also ==
- Akbar Sahraei
