= Tom Runyon =

American bank robber and prison writer

- Runyon as editor of The Presidio
- Born: September 30, 1905; Nehawka, Nebraska
- Died: April 10, 1957 (aged 51); Fort Madison, Iowa
- Occupations: Laborer, bank robber, writer
- Writing career
- Notable work: In for Life: A Convict's Story (1953)

Thomas Jefferson "Tom" Runyon (September 12, 1905 – April 10, 1957) was an American bank robber who became a writer while serving a life sentence imposed in 1937 for second-degree murder and bank robbery at the Iowa State Penitentiary in Fort Madison, Iowa. He managed to dig out under an electric fence in 1943 and hid out for four days, taking hostages and stealing cars, and becoming the focus of one of the biggest manhunts in state history.

While incarcerated, Runyon became interested in writing and edited the prison magazine The Presidio, as well as authoring a memoir, In for Life: A Convict's Story, published in the USA by W. W. Norton in 1953 and internationally by Hutchinson & Co. of London. This book, together with Runyon's influential weekly newspaper column, attracted the favorable attention of crime writer Erle Stanley Gardner, earning him the nickname "Dean of Prison Writers" at the time of his death.

== Biography ==
=== Early years ===
Tom Runyon was born September 12, 1905, in Nehawka, Nebraska, the oldest of two children of a couple who had relocated to the Midwest from West Virginia. His father was an alcoholic who frequently moved the family from home to home as his occupations changed.

Treated poorly at home by his abusive father, Tom quit school shortly after starting the 7th grade and left home to work as a laborer building roads, an occupation which took him to several states. At the age of 18, he enlisted in the United States Navy, serving for a term of three years as a pharmacist's assistant before earning his honorable discharge in 1926. He enlisted for another three-year stint in 1928, ending his service in 1931, at which time he moved with his mother to Sioux Falls, South Dakota to take work as a foreman on a painting crew.

=== Crimes and imprisonment ===
Bullet holes in the car of farmer James Zrostlik give testimony to the violence of the fatal carjacking.

With work drying up and money tight in the Great Depression, Runyon joined with two brothers he met as a painter, Clair and Ira Gibson, as a member of their bank robbery gang. The crew's first robbery netted each member of the gang $1,700 — essentially a year's wages during the period. A series of robberies across the Midwest ensued, with the so-called "Gibson Gang", with a rotating cast of characters, numbering about 15 participants in all.

In November 1935, Runyon was part of a three-person crew returning from a bank robbery at the Morningside State Bank at Sioux City, a heist which netted about $2,300. Outside of Britt, Iowa, the trio's getaway car veered off the road and crashed, injuring one of the robbers. With their car inoperable, a new vehicle was urgently sought by the escaping criminals. A young farmer and his wife and two-year old son came driving down the road and Runyon and his uninjured partner, Clair Gibson, decided to carjack the automobile, firing gunshots at the car in an effort to force it to halt. The farmer, a man named James Zrostlik, was paralyzed by a shot that severed his spinal cord, subsequently dying after being dragged from the car and left in the road with his family.

Although the trio of robbers escaped with the automobile, Runyon was later identified as a suspect in the robbery and killing and made the object of a manhunt. On Sunday, March 28, 1937, Runyon was spotted in Wichita, Kansas, by an investigating multi-agency team that included representatives of the Iowa Bureau of Investigation, the Federal Bureau of Investigation, the county sheriff's office, and Wichita police. He was in a car towing a house trailer and his escape attempt lasted only three blocks before he surrendered without further incident.

Runyon waived extradition and was taken to Iowa for trial, with authorities stating he and the Gibson gang were suspects in as many as 50 bank robberies across the Midwest. On March 6, 1937, he pleaded guilty to second-degree murder and bank robbery and on March 7 he was sentenced to life imprisonment at the Iowa State Penitentiary in Fort Madison.

In July 1939, he was also convicted in federal court in Winona, Minnesota, and sentenced to a second life term for robbing the Farmers State Bank in Eyota, Minnesota of $3,100, in November 1936, with Clair Gibson and another accomplice; Runyon was dressed as a priest to avert suspicion.

=== 1943 escape ===
On September 13, 1943, Runyon managed to escape from the Iowa State Penitentiary; he slithered through a shallow hole dug under a high-voltage electric fence at the back of the prison yard. He hid in a barn owned by a farmer named Earl Vincent, located near the town of West Point, before taking Vincent and his wife captive with a pitchfork, stealing their car.

Runyon's 1943 prison escape was front-page news across Iowa, prompting one of the largest manhunts in state history.

When the first car had a flat tire, Runyon carjacked another car, briefly abducting the occupants in the process. Runyon was "on the lam" for four days in all, briefly exchanging gunfire with a farmer near Iowa Falls during this time. One of the biggest manhunts in Iowa history followed, with the escaped bank robber finally apprehended by law enforcement authorities in a residential area of Fort Dodge. During the short period of his escape, Runyon had managed to abduct five people and engaged in two gunfights.

After his escape, the angry warden placed Runyon into "solid lockup" — solitary confinement in a dank basement cell — for a total of 10 months. Runyon vividly remembered the miserable conditions he endured:

"Water trickled down the wall for weeks, and no amount of wiping could get the floor dry. Magazines were as limp as rags and cigarettes had to be dried against the light bulb before they could be smoked."

=== Prison writer ===
Although notorious as a bank robber of the 1930s, Runyon is best remembered as a writer from behind prison walls. Although he had no knowledge of or experience in writing when he entered prison, he developed an interest after his incarceration, becoming co-editor of The Presidio, the Iowa State Penitentiary's inmate magazine.

He was editor of the publication at the time of his 1943 escape, a high privilege granted by the Warden, who took the escape as a severe violation of trust. Runyon was removed as co-editor of the prison magazine and was not permitted to write again for the publication until 1948. Back with The Presidio, Runyon launched what would become a regular column called "Leaves from a Lifer's Notebook" in November 1948, which focused upon the plight of convicts in the Iowa prison system sentenced to life terms rather than terms of fixed duration. Runyon's adocacy found receptive ears in the Iowa governor's office, and his articles are credited with the terms of 14 "lifers" being commuted to fixed terms of imprisonment, making them eventually eligible for parole.

In the winter of 1949, Runyon wrote a column called "Christmas Behind the Eight Ball", recounting the story of prisoner Ole Lindquist, who as a 19-year-old had been sentenced to life in 1909 for killing a police officer during a bar fight. Lindquist had not had a single visitor or letter from the outside world for 20 years, Runyon wrote, yet had maintained his dignity in the hostile world behind bars. The story was picked up by several newspapers around Iowa, with the result that Lindquist received hundreds of letters and Christmas packages from sympathetic readers around the state. Letters also flooded the office of Governor William S. Beardsley, who soon requested that the state parole board review the cases of all Iowa "lifers". Lindquist was ultimately paroled in 1952 and married a woman who had begun writing him as part of the campaign.

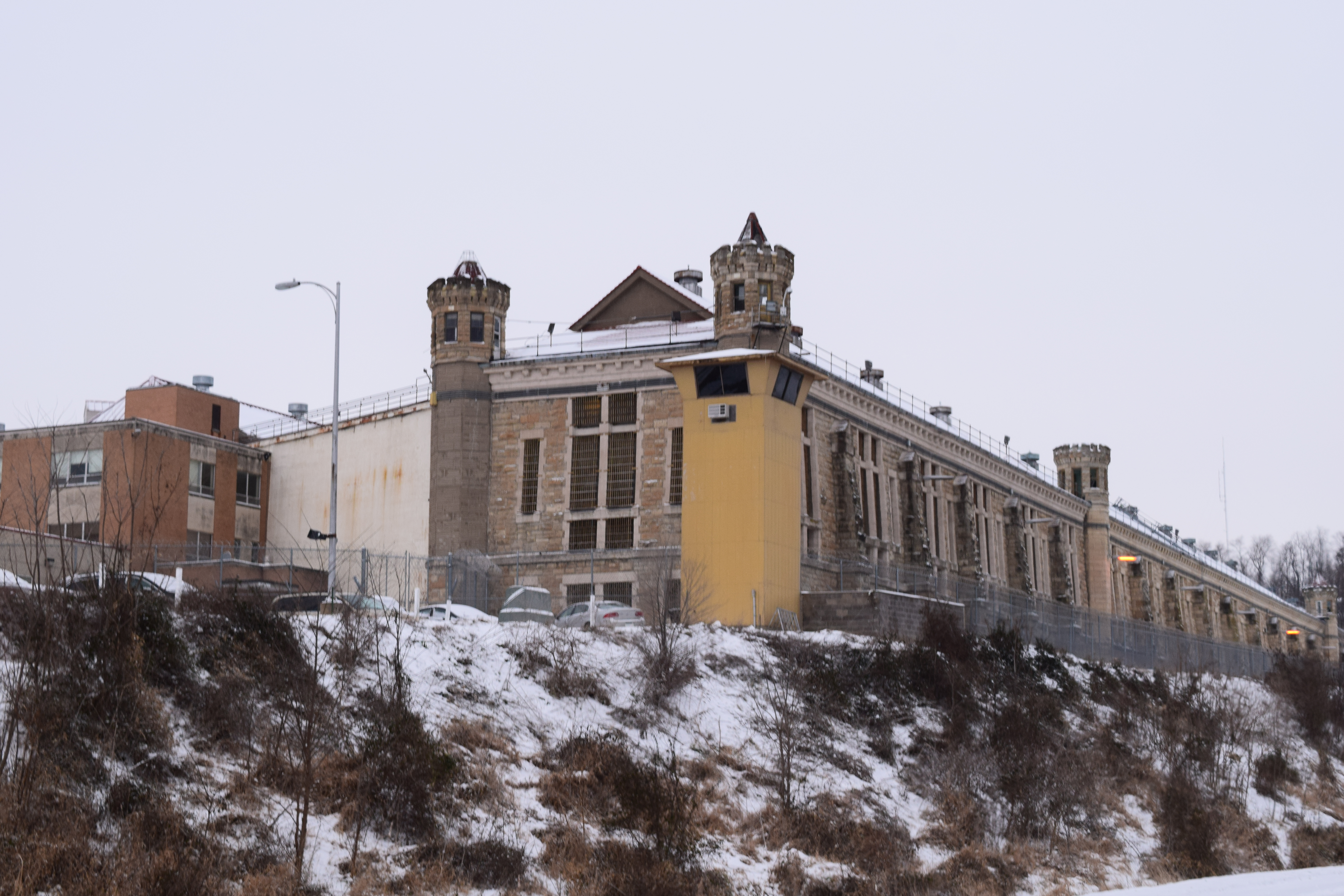
The old Iowa State Penitentiary at Fort Madison, where Runyon spent the last two decades of his life.

Runyon began sending his material to a literary agent, who managed to land the self-taught author a book deal. The prison literature memoir that resulted, entitled In for Life: A Convict's Story, was published in 1953 through W. W. Norton & Co. of New York. It traces Runyon's path into crime, in chapters including "Bending the Twig" and "Why Not Rob a Bank?". It then describes his life as a lifer at Fort Madison, the fellow inmates he met there, and his long stay in solitary confinement after the escape attempt. The book was also published internationally, with a hardcover edition appearing in the United Kingdom in 1954, published by André Deutsch, followed by a second British edition in 1956 published by Hamilton & Co. Mass paperback editions were also produced. Runyon eventually received approximately $4,000 in royalties for his literary efforts.

Runyon's memoir and growing skill as a writer attracted the attention of Perry Mason creator and nationally renowned crime writer Erle Stanley Gardner, who advocated Runyon's release on parole. This request was not looked upon favorably by the Iowa Parole Board, however.

=== Death and legacy ===
On April 10, 1957, Tom Runyon died of a heart attack at the Iowa State Penitentiary at Fort Madison. He was 51 years old at the time of his death and was described by ISP warden Percy Lainson as a "model prisoner" since his 1943 recapture.

Owing to his successful memoir and series of critical columns written on the prison and parole system, at the time of his death Runyon was remembered as the "Dean of Prison Writers".

In 2022, Mark Fullenkamp gave a talk to the Rotary Club of Iowa City Downtown on "The Story of Tom Runyon, Prison Journalist at Iowa State Penitentiary in Fort Madison".

== Works ==
- In for Life: A Convict's Story. New York: W. W. Norton & Co., 1953.

== See also ==
- American prison literature
