= American prison literature =

American literature

American prison literature is literature written by people who are incarcerated in the United States. It is a distinct literary phenomenon that is increasingly studied as such by academics.

In the words of Arnold Erickson:

Prison has been a fertile setting for artists, musicians, and writers alike. Prisoners have produced hundreds of works that have encompassed a wide range of literature. [...] Books describing the prison experience, including the Autobiography of Malcolm X, inspired an audience far outside the prison walls. The importance of these works has been recognized in this country's highest courts. See Simon & Schuster, Inc. v. Crime Victims Board, 502 U.S. 105, 121-122 (1991)(citing works by prisoners).

== History ==
The emergence of prison writing relied on convicts with the necessary writing skills to tell their stories from the inside. Early writings came from prisoners who had already begun to publish before being arrested. Among these early-20th-century writers was Jack London, who spent a month in 1894 in New York State's Erie County Penitentiary. This transformative experience informed much of his writing.

=== Early 20th century ===
Prison writing has often been seen as an act of political resistance. In the first two decades of the 20th century, the prisoners who were published were primarily social activists. Socialist writer Kate Richards O'Hare, spent a year in prison (1919–1920), causing her to dedicate her life to exposing the horrors of prison conditions and the economic structure by which they were supported. Anarchist activists Emma Goldman and Alexander Berkman also wrote while imprisoned, deepening their philosophical convictions and influencing people worldwide.

One of the most widely read early accounts of prison life in the 20th century was My Life in Prison (1912), by Donald Lowrie. The book inspired Thomas Mott Osborne, who later became warden at Sing Sing, to dedicate his career to prison reform. In 1924, after World War I, H.L. Mencken founded the American Mercury magazine and regularly published convict authors.

At the onset of the Great Depression, authorities began to perceive prison writing as a threat to American society. Manuscripts were potentially profitable subversive tools, and therefore all writing was suppressed.

In 1932, Robert E. Burns published his memoir I Am a Fugitive from a Georgia Chain Gang, which was subsequently made into the movie I Am a Fugitive from a Chain Gang. As a prison escapee, he wrote to expose the realities of prison slavery. During this time, the entire population felt the effects of poverty, crime, and hardship, making more people receptive to prison narratives.

Chester Himes began writing after going to prison for armed robbery. He reported: "When I could see the end of my time inside I bought myself a typewriter and taught myself to touch type. I'd been reading stories by Dashiell Hammett in Black Mask and I thought I could do them just as well. When my stories finally appeared, the other convicts thought exactly the same thing. There was nothing to it. All you had to do was tell it like it is."

Another writer to emerge during the 1930s was Nelson Algren, whose short story "El Presidente de Mejico" explored his experience in a Texas jail.

=== Post-WWII ===
The Autobiography of Malcolm X, published in 1965, was the first full-length memoir of an African-American convict. Co-written by Alex Haley, the book was published the same year that X was assassinated. Prisoners and ex-prisoners began using the printed word to participate in revolutionary activities. Among those influenced by Malcolm X were Eldridge Cleaver, Iceberg Slim, Piri Thomas, and Jack Henry Abbott.

The literary renaissance of prison writing coincided with the social and political unrest of the 1960s and 1970s. There was tremendous support for incarcerated writers since they represented an important front in the culture war. Inner city riots and prison riots exemplified the volatile emotional state of the entire population. The escape attempt in 1971 by San Quentin inmate and author George Jackson (Soledad Brother) ended in bloodshed. The previous year, George's younger brother Jonathan had staged an unsuccessful hostage-taking raid aimed at freeing the three "Soledad Brothers". Activist author Angela Davis was implicated in the raid because the guns used were registered in her name. The August 1971 shooting death of George Jackson by San Quentin prison guards led to a hunger strike at New York's Attica Prison. The strike eventually resulted in a prisoner uprising and a subsequent police assault leaving 128 wounded and 39 dead (ten of whom were hostages).

By the late 1970s, prison writing was being published extensively in "mass-market paperbacks, newspapers, magazines, major motion pictures." In the 1980s and 1990s, however, there was something of a backlash. New York State led the legislative attack against prison writing. In 1977, the "Son of Sam" law made it illegal for convict authors to collect money from their writings. Some claim that "[a]lthough ostensibly designed to 'protect the victim' and to keep criminals from profiting from their crimes, the real purpose of these laws was identical to the purpose of the repression of prison literature in the 1930s: to keep the American people in the dark about the American prison."

According to Bell Gale Chevigny (1999), prison writing began to go out of fashion in the 1980s. One event triggering this reaction was the 1981 publication of the letters that Jack Henry Abbott wrote from prison to Norman Mailer. This enormously popular publication, entitled In the Belly of the Beast, documented the rage Abbott had cultivated in his years of incarceration. Within six weeks of his release from prison, Abbott killed a man during a fight.

One of the few institutions that still continues to support prison writing is the PEN American Center.

== PEN American Center Prison Writing Program ==
PEN American Center (Poets, Playwrights, Essayists, Editors, and Novelists) is a national chapter of an international association of writers working towards peace. The Center established its Prison Writing Program in 1971, when PEN president Tom Fleming began lobbying for educational opportunities for prisoners. These efforts resulted in reduced censorship, better access to typewriters, and classes, and improved prison libraries.

In 1973, PEN began its annual prison writing contest. Though it had some very difficult years in the 1980s, the contest has taken place every year since its inception. The Prison Writing Program continues to provide mentoring opportunities and publish information concerning prison writing, as well as anthologizing contest winners.

== Sources ==
- Chevigny, B. G. (Ed.) (1999). Doing time: 25 years of prison writing. New York: Arcade.
- Franklin, H. B. (Ed.) (1998). Prison writing in twentieth-century America. New York: Penguin.
