= Houshang Golshiri =

Iranian novelist, short story writer and literary critic (1938–2000)

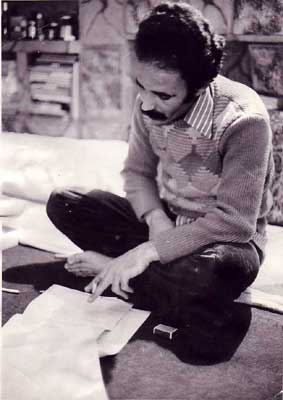
Houshang Golshiri in 1975

Houshang Golshiri (Persian: هوشنگ گلشیری; 16 March 1938 – 5 June 2000) was an Iranian novelist, short story writer, literary critic and editor. He is regarded as one of the most influential modernist writers in Persian literature of the second half of the 20th century. Known for his experimentation with narrative structure, language and point of view, he helped introduce and develop modern literary techniques in Persian fiction. His best-known work is the novella Prince Ehtejab (1968), which was adapted into a film in 1974. Other significant works include Christine and Kid (1971), The Lost Lamb of the Shepherd (1977), Mirrors with Cover Doors (1992) and The Book of the Jinn (1998).

In addition to his fiction, Golshiri was an influential literary editor and teacher. He was associated with the literary journal Jong-e Isfahan, helped establish literary workshops for younger writers, and participated in efforts to defend freedom of expression and revive the Iranian Writers' Association. He received the Lillian Hellman–Dashiell Hammett Award in 1997 and the Erich Maria Remarque Peace Prize in 1999.

== Biography ==
=== Early life and education ===
Golshiri was born in Isfahan, Iran, on 16 March 1938, into a working-class family. His family moved to Abadan in 1943, where his father worked in construction for the Anglo-Iranian Oil Company. Golshiri spent much of his childhood there before returning to Isfahan in 1955. The contrast between the industrial environment of Abadan and the historical and cultural setting of Isfahan later appeared in some of his autobiographical writing and fiction.

During his youth, he worked in the bazaar and in factories while attending Adab High School in Isfahan. After completing secondary education, he briefly worked in a legal registrar's office. In 1958, he began teaching in rural primary schools while studying Persian literature at the University of Isfahan. He received his bachelor's degree in 1962 and subsequently taught in secondary schools in Isfahan and the surrounding region until 1974.

=== Early literary activities and imprisonment ===
Golshiri became involved in literary circles in Isfahan while he was a student and teacher. He attended the Sa'eb Literary Society, where writers read their work and discussed one another's writing. These meetings introduced him to several contemporary writers and critics, including Bahram Sadeghi, Mohammad Hoghoughi and Abu'l-Hasan Najafi. Sadeghi, in particular, became an important literary influence and a close friend.

His first published short story, Chenār (The Plane Tree), appeared in the literary journal Payam-e Novin in January 1961. He also published poems and articles on rural popular culture, including local games, folk tales and traditional poetry. Some of these articles appeared under his own name and others under the pseudonym Siavosh Agah.

Through his literary activities and contacts, Golshiri became associated with members and former members of the Tudeh Party, the Iranian communist party. He was arrested in early 1962 and spent five months in prison. Following his release, he distanced himself from party politics and concentrated increasingly on literature. His experience of imprisonment later informed several stories, particularly those collected in My Little Prayer Room (1975) and The Armory (1983).

=== Jong-e Isfahan ===
In the mid-1960s, Golshiri became one of the leading members of Jong-e Isfahan (also written Jong-e Esfahan), a literary journal and circle established by a group of younger writers and intellectuals in Isfahan. The journal emerged from the discussions of the Sa'eb circle and sought to promote new approaches to literature, including formal experimentation and engagement with contemporary literary theories.

Eleven issues of Jong-e Isfahan appeared between 1965 and 1981. Its contributors included Golshiri, his brother Ahmad Golshiri, Mohammad Hoghoughi, Abu'l-Hasan Najafi, Zia Movahed and Ahmad Mir-Alaei. The group held regular discussion sessions in which writers presented manuscripts and received criticism from other participants. These meetings became an important part of Golshiri's literary development and later influenced the writing workshops he organized in Tehran.

The journal and its associated literary circle became an important centre of modernist literary activity outside Tehran. Its members challenged the dominance of conventional social realism and encouraged experimentation with narrative form, language and literary perspective.

== Literary career ==
=== Early fiction and Prince Ehtejab ===
Golshiri's first collection of short stories, Mesl-e Hamisheh (As Always), was published in Tehran in 1968. The collection contains seven stories and already demonstrates his interest in complex narration and the relationship between memory, imagination and experience.

His best-known work, Prince Ehtejab (Shazdeh Ehtejab), was also published in 1968. The short novel centres on a member of a declining aristocratic family who, through memories, documents and recollections, confronts the violence and moral corruption of his ancestors. The narrative moves between different periods and perspectives, using internal monologue and fragmented memories to portray the psychological disintegration of its central character.

The work is frequently discussed as a major example of modernist Persian fiction. Its use of stream of consciousness, shifting narrative perspectives and non-linear chronology marked a departure from more conventional forms of storytelling. The novel also examines the decline of the traditional aristocracy and the relationship between inherited power, historical memory and individual responsibility.

In 1974, the novel was adapted into a feature film directed by Bahman Farmanara, with the same title. The film received the Winged Ibex award for best feature film at the Third International Film Festival in Tehran and was subsequently shown at film festivals in London, Berlin and Cannes.

=== Christine and Kid ===
Golshiri's second novel, Kristin o Kid (Christine and Kid), was published in 1971. The work explores the relationship between a writer, his memories and the act of writing itself. It is partly autobiographical and draws on an emotional relationship involving an English teacher in Isfahan. Rather than presenting a straightforward account of events, the narrative examines how the writer's attempts to reconstruct and interpret personal experience affect the people and relationships being described.

The novel reflects Golshiri's interest in the experimental techniques associated with the French nouveau roman movement. Its treatment of the relationship between fiction and lived experience became an important feature of his later writing.

=== My Little Prayer Room and The Lost Lamb of the Shepherd ===
In 1975, Golshiri published Namazkhane-ye Kuchak-e Man (My Little Prayer Room), a collection of nine short stories. Several stories in the collection deal with political prisoners, political movements and the psychological consequences of imprisonment. They also reflect his observations of political and social life in Iran during the early 1960s.

His novel Barreh-ye Gomshode-ye Ra'i (The Lost Lamb of the Shepherd) was published in 1977. It was conceived as the first volume of a projected three-volume work. The novel explores recurring patterns of violence, fear and political repression in Iranian history, with particular attention to the experiences of intellectuals and women. Its characters struggle to change their circumstances while remaining caught in inherited social and historical structures.

=== Political activity and the Ten Nights of Poetry ===
Golshiri's literary activities increasingly became connected with the defence of freedom of expression. In 1973, he was arrested for a second time and spent six months in detention. After his release, he was prohibited from publishing his work for five years and lost his teaching position. He subsequently moved to Tehran.

From 1974 to 1978, the literary meetings associated with Jong-e Isfahan continued in Tehran, bringing together writers and critics from different generations. Participants included Dariush Ashuri, Mohammad Ali Sepanlou, Mahshid Amirshahi, Reza Seyed Hosseini and Parviz Mohajer. From 1978, these gatherings operated as meetings of the Iranian Writers' Association.

In October 1977, Golshiri participated in the series of literary and political meetings known as the Ten Nights (Dah Shab), organized by the Iranian Writers' Association with the support of the Goethe-Institut. The event brought together writers and poets who addressed censorship, literature and freedom of expression. Golshiri delivered a lecture entitled Javānmargi dar Nasr-e Mo'āser-e Fārsi (The Early Death of Contemporary Persian Prose), in which he examined the development and limitations of modern Persian fiction.

=== After the 1979 Revolution ===
Golshiri travelled to the United States in 1978 on a grant from PEN International, where he spoke about modern Persian literature. He returned to Iran during the Iranian Revolution and continued his literary and teaching activities. He was among the founders of the Independent Association of Editors in Isfahan and remained active in the Iranian Writers' Association.

In 1979, he married translator Farzaneh Taheri. He taught at the Faculty of Fine Arts at the University of Tehran, but in 1981 he was dismissed during the Iranian Cultural Revolution, when universities were reorganized and a number of secular and politically critical academics lost their positions.

Despite restrictions on publication and the suspension of the Writers' Association's activities, Golshiri continued to organize literary classes and workshops. He also edited and contributed to literary journals, including Naqd-e Agah, Kargah-e Qesseh, Mofid, Zendeh Rud, Arghavan and Karnameh. Some of his works were published outside Iran because of restrictions on their publication domestically.

=== Works of the 1980s ===
In 1979, Golshiri published Ma'sum-e Panjom (The Fifth Infallible Martyr), a short narrative combining historical and philosophical reflection with poetic and fictional elements. The work explores the relationship between historical memory, political authority and recurring patterns of violence.

His collection Jobbe-khaneh (The Armory) appeared in 1983 and contains four short stories. In 1984, he published Hadis-e Mahigir o Div (The Story of the Fisherman and the Demon), a novella based on a story from One Thousand and One Nights.

In 1989, he published Panj Ganj (Five Treasures) in Stockholm. The collection contains five short stories, including Fath-nameh-ye Moghan, later translated as The Chronicle of the Victory of the Magi. The latter work was subsequently translated into French and English.

=== International activities and later fiction ===
Golshiri left Iran for the first time after the Revolution in November 1989, participating in a cultural exchange programme in the Netherlands. During this period he also visited Belgium, the United Kingdom and Sweden. In subsequent years, he attended literary seminars and gave readings in Europe and the United States.

In 1991, he published Dar Velayat-e Hava, a novel released in Stockholm. The following year, Ayeneha-ye Dardar (Mirrors with Cover Doors) appeared in Los Angeles. The latter novel follows an intellectual writer travelling through European cities to give literary readings, while reflecting on the process of writing and the uncertain boundary between personal memory and fiction.

In 1995, Golshiri published Dast-e Tarik, Dast-e Roshan (Dark Hands, Light Hands), a collection of five short stories. The same year, he published An Ode to the Poetry of Silence, a volume containing two extended essays on poetry.

His novel Jenn-nameh (The Book of the Jinn or The Book of the Jinns) was completed during a period of residence in Germany in 1997 and published in Stockholm in 1998. The novel uses satire and complex narrative techniques to explore Iranian history, culture and political experience. It is regarded as one of his major later works.

In 1997, Golshiri also published Jadal-e Naqsh ba Naqqash (The Struggle of Image with Painter), a critical study of the fiction of Iranian novelist Simin Daneshvar. His collection of essays, Bagh dar Bagh (Garden in Garden), was published in two volumes in 1999.

== Literary style and influence ==
Golshiri is regarded as a major figure in the development of literary modernism in Persian fiction. His writing is characterized by complex narrative structures, shifting points of view, internal monologues, fragmented chronology and a close examination of the relationship between memory and imagination. He frequently experimented with the formal possibilities of prose, developing different narrative strategies for individual works rather than relying on a single recognizable method.

His work challenged the dominance of conventional social realism in modern Persian literature. Although he was interested in social and political questions, he resisted the idea that fiction should simply reproduce reality or serve as direct political propaganda. He argued for a form of literature that combined imaginative freedom, technical experimentation and an engagement with the cultural and linguistic resources of Persian literature.

Golshiri drew on both classical Persian literature and modern international fiction. His writing demonstrates an interest in traditional narrative forms, historical texts and literary allusion, while also incorporating techniques associated with modernist and experimental writers. His engagement with the nouveau roman and other developments in twentieth-century literature is particularly evident in Christine and Kid and Mirrors with Cover Doors.

The relationship between the writer and the act of writing is another recurring theme. In several works, characters attempt to reconstruct their past through documents, memories and competing accounts. The resulting narratives often leave the reader uncertain about the reliability of individual perspectives and the distinction between historical fact and fictional reconstruction.

Golshiri's literary influence extended beyond his published works. Through his workshops, editing and participation in literary circles, he helped introduce younger writers to modern narrative techniques and critical approaches. His teaching sessions became an important part of the development of later generations of Iranian fiction writers.

== Literary workshops and journalism ==
Alongside his fiction, Golshiri devoted considerable attention to literary education and criticism. He organized regular writing classes and workshops in which participants read and discussed short stories and other literary works. These sessions encouraged close reading, technical analysis and experimentation with narrative form. His workshops helped nurture a number of younger Iranian writers and continued until the later years of his life.

He also worked as an editor and contributor to several literary journals. His editorial activities included work with Jong-e Isfahan and, later, Karnameh. His essays addressed the development of the Persian novel, the relationship between literary technique and creativity, the role of the writer in society and the importance of freedom of expression.

In 1994, Golshiri was among the writers and intellectuals who signed the open letter known as the Letter of 134, which called for freedom of thought and expression and opposed censorship. He was also involved in efforts to revive the Iranian Writers' Association. In 1998, he was elected as a provisional member of the association's board.

== Awards and recognition ==
Golshiri received several literary and human rights awards during his career:

- The Forugh Farrokhzad Award, shared with Bahram Sadeghi, before the Iranian Revolution.
- The Lillian Hellman–Dashiell Hammett Award, presented by Human Rights Watch in 1997, in recognition of his commitment to freedom of expression.
- The Erich Maria Remarque Peace Prize, awarded in 1999 by the city of Osnabrück, Germany, for his literary and social efforts in support of freedom of speech, democracy and human rights in Iran.

== Death ==
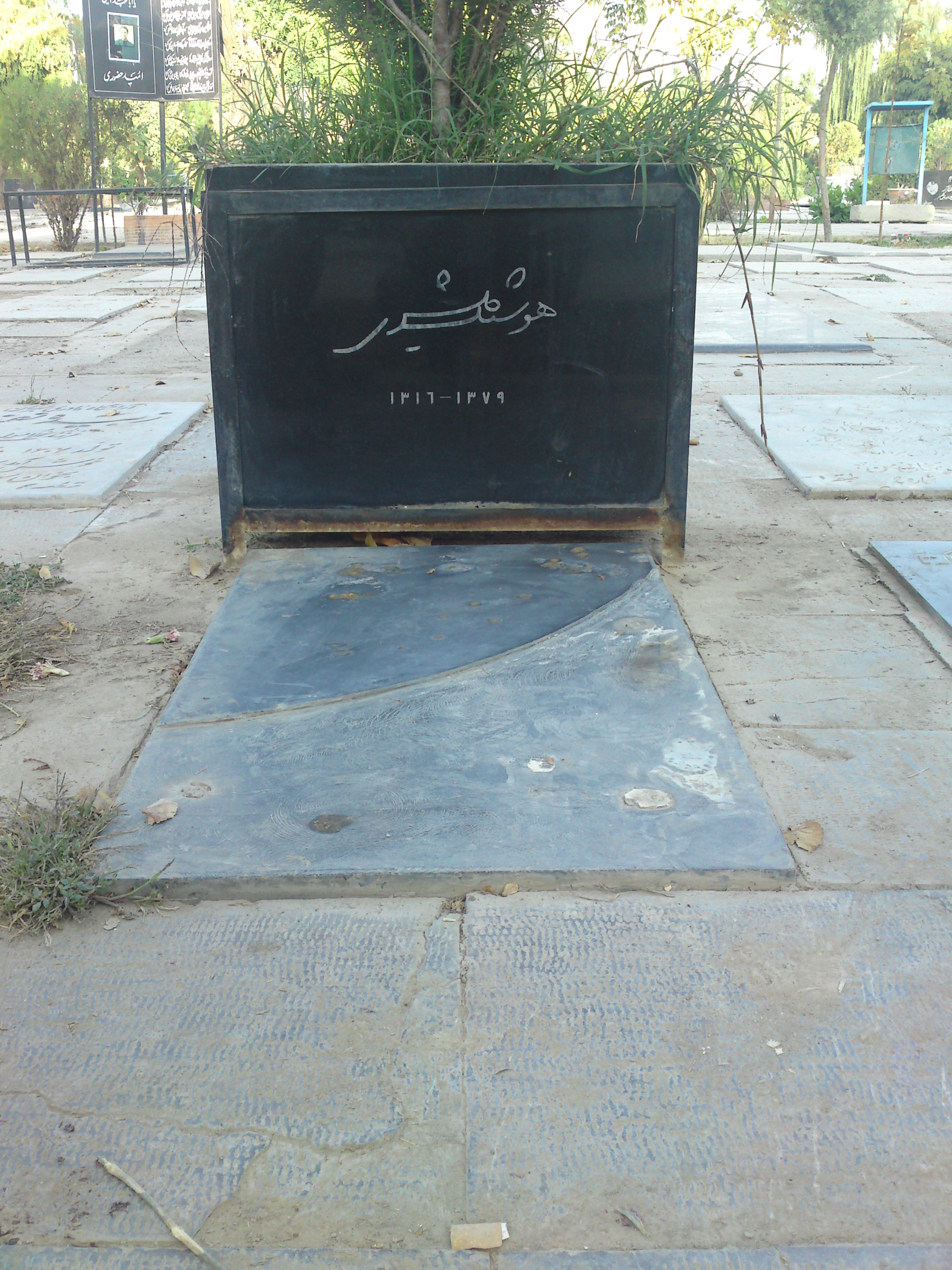
Tomb of Houshang Golshiri

In his later years, Golshiri continued to write, teach and participate in literary activities despite increasing restrictions on independent writers in Iran. He died at Iran Mehr Hospital in Tehran on 5 June 2000, following an illness caused by meningitis. He was 62 years old.

Golshiri was buried at the cemetery of the Imamzadeh Taher shrine in Karaj, near the graves of writers Mohammad Mokhtari and Mohammad-Ja'far Pouyandeh, who had been murdered during the Chain murders of Iran. Two years before his death, Golshiri had delivered a public speech at their graveside condemning political violence and defending freedom of expression.

== Golshiri Foundation ==
Following his death, the Houshang Golshiri Foundation was established to preserve his literary legacy and promote Persian literature. The foundation organizes the Houshang Golshiri Literary Awards, which recognize outstanding works of contemporary Persian fiction. It also maintains biographical and bibliographical information about Golshiri and his writings.

== Selected works ==
The following list includes major works by Golshiri. Publication years refer to the original Persian editions unless otherwise stated.

=== Novels and novellas ===
- Shazdeh Ehtejab (Prince Ehtejab, 1968)
- Kristin o Kid (Christine and Kid, 1971)
- Barreh-ye Gomshode-ye Ra'i (The Lost Lamb of the Shepherd, vol. 1, 1977)
- Ma'sum-e Panjom (The Fifth Infallible Martyr, 1979)
- Hadis-e Mahigir o Div (The Story of the Fisherman and the Demon, 1984)
- Dar Velayat-e Hava (1991)
- Ayeneha-ye Dardar (Mirrors with Cover Doors, 1992)
- Jenn-nameh (The Book of the Jinn, 1998)
- Shah-e Siah-pushan (The King of the Black-clad), attributed to Golshiri and published in Persian in 2001; its English translation, King of the Benighted, had appeared in 1990 under the pseudonym Manuchehr Irani.

=== Short story collections ===
- Mesl-e Hamisheh (As Always, 1968)
- Namazkhane-ye Kuchak-e Man (My Little Prayer Room, 1975)
- Jobbe-khaneh (The Armory, 1983)
- Panj Ganj (Five Treasures, 1989)
- Dast-e Tarik, Dast-e Roshan (Dark Hands, Light Hands, 1995)

=== Literary criticism and essays ===
- Jadal-e Naqsh ba Naqqash (The Struggle of Image with Painter, 1997), a critical study of the fiction of Simin Daneshvar.
- Bagh dar Bagh (Garden in Garden, 1999), a two-volume collection of essays and articles.
- An Ode to the Poetry of Silence (1995), a volume containing two essays on poetry.

== Film adaptations ==
- Prince Ehtejab (1974), directed by Bahman Farmanara, based on Golshiri's novella of the same name.
- Tall Shadows of the Wind (Sayeh-ha-ye Boland-e Bad, 1978), directed by Bahman Farmanara and based on Golshiri's short story Ma'sum-e Avval (The First Innocent).
- Dad's Fragile Doll (2013), an animated film directed by Ali Zare Ghanat Nowi, based on a short story by Golshiri.

== See also ==
- Persian literature
- Iranian Writers' Association
- Modernist literature
