= Jane Franklin (disambiguation) =

Jane Franklin (1791–1875) was a London-born Tasmanian adventuress.

Jane Franklin may also refer to:

== People ==
- Jane Franklin Mecom (1712–1794), youngest sister of Benjamin Franklin
- Jane Franklin Hommel (1878–1946), suffragette from Tennessee
- Jane Franklin (cricketer) (born 1974), cricketer from Victoria, Australia
- Jane Franklin (author), American historian focusing on Cuba-U.S. relations

== Organizations ==
- Jane Franklin Hall, a residential college of the University of Tasmania
