= Soluch =

Soluch may refer to:

- Soluch Airfield, Soluch, Libya.
- Soluch concentration camp, Suluq, Libya
- An alternative spelleling of Suluq
- Soluch, a character from the 1979 Iranian book translated as Missing Soluch
