= Jamal Mirsadeghi =

Iranian writer

Jamal (Hossein) Mirsadeghi (Persian: جمال میرصادقی; born May 9, 1933) is an Iranian writer. He was born in Tehran, and graduated in Persian Literature from the Literature and Human Science Faculty of Tehran University. He held various jobs as an aide, teacher, library staff, and examination designer for governmental employers and staff in the national old document centre, and as a creative writing lecturer. He has written ten novels, numerous short stories, a fiction dictionary, and published some research on literature and the short story. His writing has been translated into English, German, Armenian, Georgian, Italian, Russian, Romanian, Hebrew, Arabic, Hungarian, Urdu, Hindi and Chinese. He lives in Tehran and teaches creative writing and short story writing.

In 2012 Ali Zare Ghanat Nowi wrote the screenplay of The Lights, which he also produced and directed. It's about Jamal Mirsadeghi, his life and writings.
