= Missing Soluch =

First edition

Missing Soluch (Persian: جای خالی سلوچ Ja-ye Khali-ye Soluch; 1979) is a novel by Iranian author Mahmoud Dowlatabadi, translated from the Persian by Kamran Rastegar in 2007. It was shortlisted for the 2008 Best Translated Book Award.

Dowlatabadi wrote it in just 70 days, after he was released from prison, having composed it in memory while in jail. The novel was written between the second and third volume of his 10-volume novel, Kelidar. It was the first complete standalone novel of the author written in the everyday language of the people, Persian, and was hugely influential at the time of Revolutionary Iran for its sympathetic depiction of the proletariat, which was new in modern Iranian literature. It was Dowlatabad's first novel to be translated into English (2007).

== Summary ==
The novel depicts rural village life in a fictional town in northern Iran in the 1960s, a time when many people from the countryside were moving to cities. The main character is Mergan, a woman whose husband, Soluch, has left without a word, leaving behind two boys ('Abbaas and Abraawa) and a girl, Haajar. The novel shows what happens as Mergan's family falls prey to the everyday calamities of the poor such as theft, starvation and violence, paralleling the demise of the village to the forces of modernity.

== Reception ==
Translator Kamran Rastegar wrote an essay about the novel called "Reading Missing Soluch in the U.S.: Treating Mahmoud Dowlatabadi’s Ja-ye Khali-ye Soluch as art rather than political metaphor". He says that "Dowlatabadi delicately attempts to trace the significant changes to rural life in Iran over the course of one generation in the mid-twentieth century."

Ben Lytal of the New York Sun praised it, claiming that it was the one book from 2007 that he most wanted to recommend. Elham Gheytanchi in Words Without Borders says "..that Dowlatabadi has created a masterpiece; a story of poverty-stricken villagers whose feelings and fears leave us anguished because their fears capture our imagination, our existential doubts about the meaning of life and death." Publishers Weekly called it "a stark but engrossing portrait of contemporary rural Iran.. The story is relentless, but beautifully and incisively rendered, and imbued throughout with hope."
