= Ali Zare Ghanat Nowi =

Iranian film director (born 1981)

- علی زارع قنات نوی
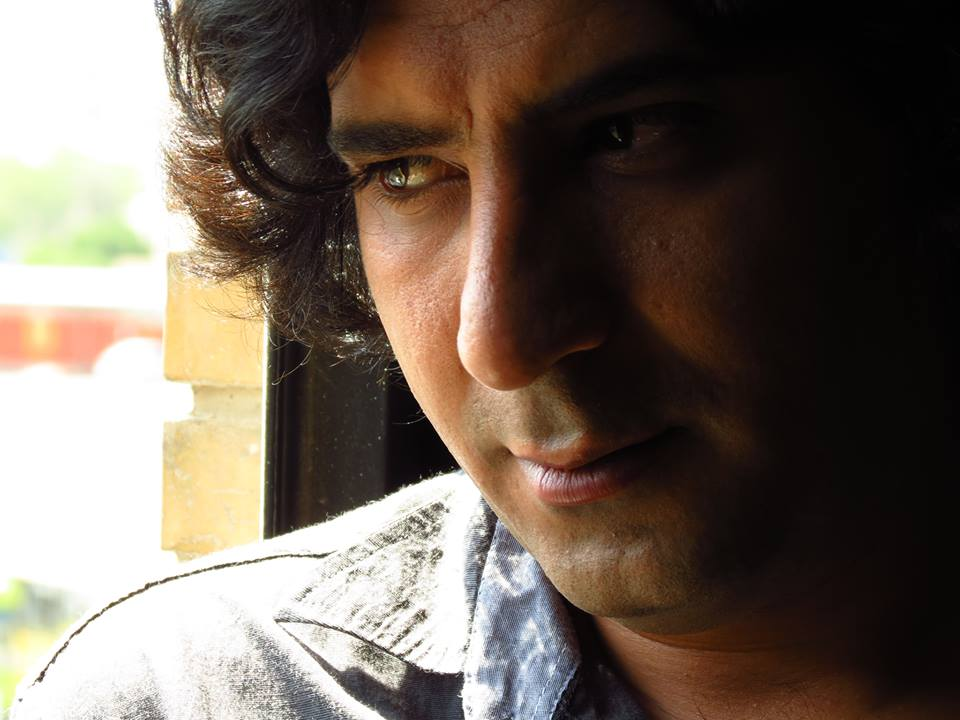
- Born: 26 January 1981; Shiraz, Iran
- Education: University of Tehran; Berlin Film School
- Occupations: Film director, screenwriter, photographer, producer
- Years active: 2000–present
- Notable work: Red Mind (2009); Dad's Fragile Doll (2013); Empty View (2017); The Internationale (2017)

Ali Zare Ghanat Nowi (Persian: علی زارع قنات نوی; born 26 January 1981) is an Iranian film director, screenwriter, translator, educator, and film producer. Considered the most internationally honored Iranian director in 2014, Zare has represented Iran at more than 130 festivals around the world. He has directed, produced, written, or edited more than 20 films, including animations, shorts, and documentaries. His two most popular films have been Dad's Fragile Doll (2013) and Empty View (2017), with the first film screening at more than 100 festivals. Outside of production, he has managed a film workshop school; translated two screenplays; published two books; and served on jury panels at festivals including the Berlin International Film Festival.

== Early life and education ==
Zare was born on 26 January 1981 in Shiraz. He became interested in film during his teenage years and started working as a playwright and assistant director at Iran National Broadcasting's Fars Central Broadcasting in 1998. Among his earliest assignments were television shows called Didgah (1998) and Dalavar Mardan Tah (1999-2000), for which he served as editor, assistant director, and writer. He studied animation directing at University of Tehran and Berlin Film School.

== Career ==
Zare wrote Iran, the Year Zero (1999), a radio play following an author who returns to Iran and reckons with how it has changed, and edited and directed HandiCrafts in Fars Province (2000), a 13-part television series. He then wrote and directed his first short film, Gray Autumn (2000), about a man experiencing memory loss and coping with the unfamiliarity—and familiarity—of his surroundings. He was editor of World View (2001), a travel documentary; writer and director of Winners Win Nothing (2001); and editor and director of the short film Vahe (2003). In 2004, he started the Shiraz Film Club, a group dedicated to discussing films. Meetings were usually held at Shiraz University or at Hafez Hall. He also founded the Shiraz Cinema School (Madreseh Kargahiye Cinema), where he developed, taught, and organized workshops focused on cinema, criticism, editing, screenwriting, and more. Guest lecturers included Farzad Motamen, Homayoun As'adian, Jamal Mirsadeghi, and Rahim Hoodi. The school would later be involved in the production of several of Zare's films, including Empty View, Umbilical Cord, and Red Mind. Zare was honored with a Management Excellence award in 2010, 2011, and 2012 from the Minister of Culture in recognition of the work he did at his film school. Zare also directed commercials between 2006 and 2016.

In 2006, Zare wrote and directed Makoo, video art about three women in different times and social classes who each seem to continue life where the previous left off. This was followed by work on two documentaries: Four Deaths of a Writer (2008) and Red Mind (2009), the latter of which gained him recognition outside of Shiraz. He established the Golbarg Film Company and assumed the role of chairman of the board in 2009. Documentaries Cries and Whispers (2010) followed the day-to-day life of blind and Deaf children in specialized schools and Sistan Itinerary (2011) examined the Baloch people in an adaptation of Mahmoud Dowlatabadi's book Meet the Baloch People. Sistan Itinerary was shown at Cinéma Vérité in Iran and won second prize for best film at the Naser Khosro Festival. The same year, he worked as television director of the Fajr International Film Festival. In 2012, Zare co-wrote, produced, and directed The Lights, an examination of Jamal Mirsadeghi's life and writing. This was shown in the portrait category at Cinéma Vérité, its first-ever public screening.

Dad's Fragile Doll, Zare's first animation, was released in 2013 and follows a girl who uses dolls to act out her revenge on the men who imprisoned and executed her father. The animation uses rotoscoping, the first time a film has done so in Iran. The screenplay was adapted from a story of the same name by Houshang Golshiri. It achieved runaway success, showing at more than 100 international film festivals and taking first place in Best Animation at a number of events, including the Shiraz Short Film Festival, Viewster Online Film Festival, Veterans Film Festival, and Mosaic Film Festival. It was nominated for Best Film at the Burien Film Festival and for Best Animation at the Erie International Film Festival and Athens Animfest. Other festivals that hosted the film included Piélagos en Corto, Animation Day in Cannes LA Shorts Fest, Anima Mundi, Seoul International Cartoon and Animation Festival, House of Cinema, Buenos Aires International Festival of Independent Cinema, and Kaohsiung Film Festival. In 2014, Zare was included in the Top 10 Filmmakers of Asia listing at the ifva Festival in Hong Kong.

In 2014, he co-wrote The Lives of Others with former student Bahareh Ahmadi. The following year, he worked with two former students on their film Jump In Love, which he produced and edited. He also produced and edited the short film Timology, then wrote and directed the experimental short film Umbilical Cord, which examines a mother's inner turmoil after losing her baby. The film was shown at the Ozark Foothills FilmFest and the Wiper Film Festival in the United States and at Experimental Superstars in Serbia. He wrote and directed the documentary Next Week (2015), which followed the day-to-day lives of disabled children. It was shown at Harrogate Film Festival, Wiper Film Festival, and International Children's Film Festival India. Zare's film school closed around 2016 due to finance-related declining attendance. Between 2015 and 2017, he worked on films including The Internationale and Essence, both of which were selected as finalists at CURTASTIK International Film Festival in 2017, and Pour with the Rain, a documentary about Amin Faghiri. Empty View, a short film about a mother waiting for her son to return from war, was animated using rotoscoping techniques. It won awards for Best Animation at the UK Monthly Film Festival, Los Angeles Film Awards, Asians On Film Festival, Edmonton International Film Festival, Mexico International Film Festival, and Amsterdam Film Festival Van Gogh Awards. The film score was composed by Mohammadreza Aligholi and the screenplay was translated and published in France in 2021.

Zare has written two books, Digital Photography Darkroom and Keywords in Cinema, and has published cinema and film reviews in newspapers such as Shargh, Etemad, and Bahar. In 2005, he translated the screenplay of the film 21 Grams and published it with Ayaneh Junob. In 2008, he translated the screenplay of the 1940 film The Grapes of Wrath, written by Nunnally Johnson, and published it with Afkar Publishing. He also designed the book covers for Jamal Mirsadeghi's Two Bright Blue Lights (2013) and World of Colors (2014). Zare has also sat on judge and jury panels at festivals including the Berlin International Film Festival, the inaugural Shiraz Film and Photo Festival, Shiraz Short Film Festival, Kolgrash Film Festival, Cinema Perpetuum Mobile Festival in Belarus, and Bangladesh International Independent Film Festival.

== Filmography ==
Year	Title/Persian title	Title in English	Type	Roles	Synopsis	Ref(s)
1999	Iran, Sale Sefr ایران، فروش صفر	Iran, the Year Zero	Radio play	Writer	An author returns to Iran and must reckon with how it has changed.	
2000	Sanaye'e Dastiye Fars صنایع دستی فارس	HandiCrafts in Fars Province	TV documentary	Editor and director	13-part documentary about locals in Fars province making handicrafts	
2000	Paeeze Khakestari پاییز خاکستری	Gray Autumn	Short film	Writer, director	A man experiencing memory loss copes with the unfamiliarity—and familiarity—of his surroundings, and with the reason he lost his memory in the first place.	
2000	Dalavar Mardan Tah دلاور مردان طاه	Gallant Heroes in Victory	Reality TV	Editor, assistant director, writer	A TV match with military members participating to win.	
2001	Barandegan Chizi Nemibarand برندگان چیزی نمیبرند	Winners Win Nothing	Short film	Writer, director	A shell-shocked soldier returns from war.	
2001	Jahan Nama جهان نما	World View	Short film	Editor		
2003	Vahe واهه	Oasis	Short film	Editor, director		
2004	MIT		Documentary	Writer, director		
2006	Makoo ماکو	Makoo	Video art	Writer, director	Three women in different times and social classes each seem to continue life where the previous left off.	
2008	Chahar Marge Yek Nevisandeh چهار مرگ یک نویسنده	Four Deaths of a Writer	Documentary	Director	A writer describes how he dies four times in his work. Co-written with Shahriar Mandanipour.	
2009	Aghle Sorkh عقل سرخ	Red Mind	Documentary	Producer, writer, director	Based on notes written by Shahab al-Din Yahya ibn Habash Suhrawardi about humanity, God, and love.	
2010	Faryadha o Najvaha فریادها یا نجواها	Cries and Whispers	Documentary	Director and writer	The life of blind and Deaf children in special schools.	
2011	Safarnameh Sistan سفرنامه سیستان	Sistan Itinerary	Documentary	Writer, director	An adaptation of the book Meet the Baloch People by Mahmoud Dowlatabadi.	
2012	Cheraghha چراغها	The Lights	Documentary	Screenwriter, producer, director, editor	The life and writing of Jamal Mirsadeghi.	
2013	Arosake Chiniye Baba عروساک چینیه بابا	Dad's Fragile Doll	Short film	Director, screenwriter, editor, producer	The daughter of a prisoner plays out her revenge on her father's executioners with dolls.	
2013	Ba Baran Bebar با باران ببار	Pour with the Rain	Documentary	Producer, editor, director	The life and writings of Amin Faghiri.	
2014	Zendegie Digaraan زندگی دیگران	The Lives of Others	Short Film	Co-Writer	A girl loses her hope to continue living. Co-production with Bahareh Ahmadi.	
2014	Shahre man, Aabaadi شهر من، آبادی	My City, the Village	TV film	Editor	Follows the problems of rural society in an Iranian village.	
2015	Bande Naaf بند ناف	Umbilical Cord	Short Film	Writer, director	The subconscious nightmares of a woman who has lost her baby.	
2015	Timology تیمولوژی	Timology	Short Film	Editor, producer	The life of a man who has been lost in time and existence.	
2015	Paresh Dar Eshq پارش دار عشق	Jump In Love	Short Film	Editor, producer	Co-produced with Ali Lavarimonfared and Vahid Mobasheri.	
2015	Hafteye Ayandeh هفته آینده	Next Week	Documentary	Writer, director, producer	Day-to-day lives of disabled children as they try to live normal lives.	
2015	Khiabane Zand خیابان زند	Zand Street	Documentary	Producer, editor, director	Film about Shiraz	
2017	Beynolmelali بینول مللی	The Internationale		Writer, producer, editor, director	A concert is interrupted by a terrorist attack, but the performers force them to retreat and surrender with the power of their music.	
2017	Chashmandaze Khali چشم انداز خالی	Empty View	Short film	Writer, director	A mother waits for her son, a martyr, to return from war.	
2018	Hasti هستی	Essence	Short Film		Inspired by Also sprach Zarathustra by Richard Strauss.	

== Honors and awards ==
Work	Year	Award	Event	Location	Ref(s)
HandiCrafts in Fars Province	2000	Best TV documentary	Iran Radio and TV Festival	Iran	
Vahe	2004	Best Editing	Shiraz MY City Festival	Iran	
Red Mind	2009	Special Jury Award	Shiraz Short Film Festival	Iran	
Sistan Itinerary	2011	Second prize: Best Film	Naser Khosro Festival	Iran	
Dad's Fragile Doll	2014	First Prize	Viewster Online Film Festival	Switzerland	
Dad's Fragile Doll	2014	First Place - Animation	Shiraz Short Film Festival	Iran	
Dad's Fragile Doll	2014	Best Animation	International Animation Film Festival	Bulgaria	
Dad's Fragile Doll	2014	Top 10 Filmmakers of Asia	ifva Festival	China	
Dad's Fragile Doll	2015	Committee Prize	Cinema Perpetuum Mobile International Short Film Festival	Belarus	
Dad's Fragile Doll	2015	Red Poppy Award for Best Animation	Veterans Film Festival	Australia	
Dad's Fragile Doll	2016	Jury's Special Award	Barakeh Provincial Short Film Festival	Iran	
Dad's Fragile Doll	2016	Special Mention Award	International Open Film Festival	Bangladesh	
Dad's Fragile Doll	2016	Best Animation	The Kids Festival	Spain	
Dad's Fragile Doll	2017	Best Animation	London-X4 Seasonal Short Film Festival	England	
Dad's Fragile Doll	2018	Best Animation	Mosaic Film Festival	USA	
Empty View	2017	Jury Award	Chania Cartoon & Animation Festival	Greece	
Empty View	2017	Best Animation (20 mins or less)	UK Monthly Film Festival	England	
Empty View	2017	Best Animation	Los Angeles Film Awards	USA	
Empty View	2017	Best Animation	Asians On Film Festival	USA	
Empty View	2018	Best Director	Southampton International Film Festival	UK	
Empty View	2018	Best Animation	Edmonton International Film Festival	Canada	
Empty View	2018	Best Animation Short	Best Short Fest	Canada	
Empty View	2018		Great Message International Film Festival	India	
Empty View	2018	Second place: Best Animated Short Film	Indie Best Films Festival	USA	
Empty View	2018	Golden Palm Award - Animation	Mexico International Film Festival	Mexico	
Empty View	2018	Best Short Film Award	Seoul Guro International Kids Film Festival	South Korea	
Empty View	2018	Audience Award	Athens Animfest	Greece	
Empty View	2018	Best Animation	Amsterdam Film Festival Van Gogh Awards	Netherlands	
