= Amin Faghiri =

Iranian researcher and writer

Amin Faghiri (Persian: امین فقیری) (30 Shiraz Persian date Azar 1322 AH, 22 December 1943 CE) is an Iranian researcher and writer.

== Early life ==
Amin Faghiri is from Shiraz and was born into a large family. He had a difficult childhood. Pour with the rain is a documentary about him by Ali Zare Ghanat Nowi which is going to be released soon.

== Writing ==
His early difficulties led him to write short stories. He had a precise method and style of writing. His stories employed realism and an honest visual style.

His first collection of short stories took four years to write. At the age of 23, he published Primal. The book was published five times before the Iranian revolution. The sixth edition was published in 1382 (2003 CE). In the book, he described the loneliness and boredom of rural teachers. He also told stories of peasant violence and the sociological persecution they faced. Faghiri, alongside Mahoud Dowlat Abadi, was one of the first Iranian rural story writers. The stories in the collection have been translated into more than a dozen languages, including English, German, Russian, Urdu, Italian, French, and Japanese. He has nineteen books in total.

== Selected Works/Publications ==
- Primal
- Anxiety Gardens Alley, Tehran, 1969
- Feuer unterm Pfauenthron. Verbotene Geschichten aus dem persischen Widerstand. Herausgegeben und übersetzt von Bahman Nirumand unter Mitarbeit von Peter Schneider, 1974 (Contributing author)
- My Beautiful Deer, 1990
- A Journey in Attraction and Pain, 1974
- Im Atem Des Drachen: Moderne Persische Erzählungen, 1991 (Contributing author) ISBN 978-3-518-11093-5
- THE BOOK OF CAT, 2016 ISBN 978-6-001-92440-8

== Honors ==
Faghiri won the Golden Tablet for best fiction in 1376 (1997 CE).
