= The Wake of the Gods =

Nonfiction book by H. Bruce Franklin

The Wake of the Gods: Melville's Mythology
- 2011 book jacket
- Author: H. Bruce Franklin
- Subject: Melville, Herman, 1819-1891 Knowledge Mythology
- Published: 2011
- Publisher: Stanford University Press
- Publication place: United States
- Media type: Print
- Pages: 236
- ISBN: 9780804701372
- OCLC: 280889
- Website: Official website

The Wake of the Gods: Melville's Mythology is a book-length literary critique of selected works written by American author Herman Melville. This book was written by the American cultural historian and scholar H. Bruce Franklin, and published by Stanford University Press in 1963.

== Synopsis ==
The central thesis is that Herman Melville consciously and extensively used myths and mythologies from various cultures in his major works. According to the book, Melville also demonstrates creating his own mythology. Franklin demonstrates that Melville was deeply knowledgeable about comparative mythology, drawing on sources ranging from Meso-American to Sanskrit, as well from Egypt and Ireland. This knowledge provided a framework for his literary creations. Regarding reinterpreting major works, the book re-examines several of Melville's most important works through a mythological lens, including:

- Mardi: Analyzed as an exploration of mythmaking.
- Moby Dick: The novel's allegorical plot draws on various mythological and metaphysical traditions.
- The Confidence-Man: The book's references to obscure classical and "alien" myths are traced and analyzed.
- "The Bell-Tower": Franklin reads this short story as a political allegory about slavery and its self-destructive consequences, with the automaton symbolizing slaves.
- Billy Budd: An analysis of the novel's connection to critiques of militarism and the repression of the "feminine in man."

Franklin says that Melville, through his work, was not simply retelling myths but was actively constructing a new mythology. This new mythology was a way for Melville to understand and critique the dominant cultural values of 19th-century America, including its fascination with technology and militarism.

Additionally, Brian Yothers, says in Chapter Three of the book entitled Melville's Mirrors (2011) that:

"H. Bruce Franklin’s The Wake of the Gods (1963) focused on Melville’s use of comparative mythology, primarily in Mardi, Moby-Dick, and The Confidence Man. Franklin argued that Melville’s reading in comparative mythology and religion and his attempts to reinterpret religious and mythological motifs offered a key to Melville’s entire career."

== About the book ==
The main narrative consists of a Preface and eight chapters. This is followed by a selected index of non-Judaic-Christian gods. The chapter titles are:

1. Melville and the gods
2. Mardi: a study of myths and mythmaking
3. Moby-Dick: an Egyptian myth incarnate
4. Pierre; or, The Ambiguities: the petrifaction of myth
5. Worldly safety and other-worldly saviors :
6. The Cofidence-Man: the destroyer's Eastern masquerade
7. Billy Budd; or, Bili-Budd: the last avatar
8. The wake of the gods

== Reception ==
Brian Yothers, says in Chapter Three of the book Melville's Mirrors that this book's author's "readings of Mardi, Moby-Dick, The Confidence-Man, and Billy Budd were a revelation... and remain among the finest readings of Melville’s work in relation to world religions.
