= Kelidar =

1984 novel by Mahmoud Dowlatabadi

- Author: Mahmoud Dowlatabadi
- Original title: کلیدر
- Language: Persian
- Genre: Novel
- Publication date: 1984
- Publication place: Iran
- Pages: 2590
- ISBN: 9783293201453

Kelidar (Persian: کلیدر) is a novel written by Mahmoud Dowlatabadi in Persian. Comprising ten books in five volumes, the novel was written over a period of fifteen years. It draws extensively on Iranian folkloric themes and has been translated into several languages. The title refers to both a mountain and a village in the Khorasan region of Iran, which serve as the principal setting for the events of the novel.

== Plot ==
The novel depicts the life of a Kurdish family living in Sabzevar, who face hostility from neighboring villagers despite shared cultural traits. Central to the narrative is the figure of Gul Mohammad, a young rebel who assumes a Robin Hood–like role, rising up against the state and the local lords and khans of Diosirt in an attempt to liberate oppressed peasants. His movement ultimately collapses due to internal divisions, and he and his companions are killed by machine-gun fire. The story unfolds against the tense political climate of Iran in the aftermath of World War II, specifically between 1946 and 1949.

Maral, a young Kurdish woman, rides to the city prison to visit her imprisoned father and her fiancé, Dilaawar. Through this visit, the novel introduces its central characters and Maral's extended family, led by her aunt Bilqis and uncle Kalmishi, who struggle to survive amid severe drought and economic hardship.

Gul Muhammad, Kalmishi's second son, has recently returned from compulsory military service. Despite being married to Ziwar, he falls in love with Maral and takes her as his second wife, igniting lasting enmity in Dilaawar. As tensions between clans intensify, Gul Muhammad kills a wealthy landowner in self-defense, then later kills two government agents sent to investigate the incident. Arrested and imprisoned, he escapes with the help of Abdus-Sattaar, a covert political activist affiliated with the Tudeh Party, who views Gul Muhammad as a potential revolutionary leader.

Living in hiding, Gul Muhammad becomes the leader of an armed resistance against oppressive lords and khans. Yet the psychological burden of leadership leads him into doubt and inner turmoil. Following a failed assassination attempt on Mohammad Reza Pahlavi, the political climate shifts dramatically: the Tudeh Party is banned, popular resistance collapses, and state power is reasserted.

The novel ends tragically with Gul Muhammad and nearly all those connected to the Kalmishi family killed. Abdus-Sattaar is also executed, and photographs of Gul Muhammad's body are published by the state as a final assertion of control.

== Characters ==
Illustrating the tragic fate of Iranian peasants and nomadic tribes during a period of power politics, and drawing on real historical events, the novel follows the trials and tribulations of the Kalmiši family and features the following supporting characters:

- Mārāl - Mārāl is a young Kurdish girl from the Kalmiši family.
- Abdus - Mārāl's father
- Delāvar - Mārāl's fiancé
- Belqays - Mārāl’s paternal aunt, the matriarch of the family and the linking thread for the novel’s events and characters
- Kalmiši -Belqays's husband
- Khan Moḥammad - son of Belqays and Kalmiši
- Gol-Moḥammad - son of Belqays and Kalmiši
- Beg Moḥammad - son of Belqays and Kalmiši
- Širu - daughter of Belqays and Kalmiši
- Sattār - one of the supporters of Gol-Mohammad.

== Reception ==
=== Critical reception ===
Kelidar is the longest Persian novel written to date, and surely one of the finest. The present translation is of parts 1 and 2 only, which are sufficiently self-contained to make for satisfying reading and which also give a good idea of what the whole is like. (...) Doulatabadi's style is that of a traditional Persian storyteller, in that he constructs his tale in a linear fashion, speaks through an omniscient narrator, and uses a balanced mixture of narrative and dialogue. (...) One wishes that readers of English could also experience the pleasures of this novel.

— William L. Hanaway, World Literature Today

== Foreign Translations ==
It has been translated into German by Sigrid Lotfi (1999) in Switzerland. Also into Central Kurdish by Siyaamand Shaasawaaree (2012) by Sardam Publishers in Iraqi Kurdistan.
