= Jane Franklin (author) =

American historian

Jane Morgan Franklin
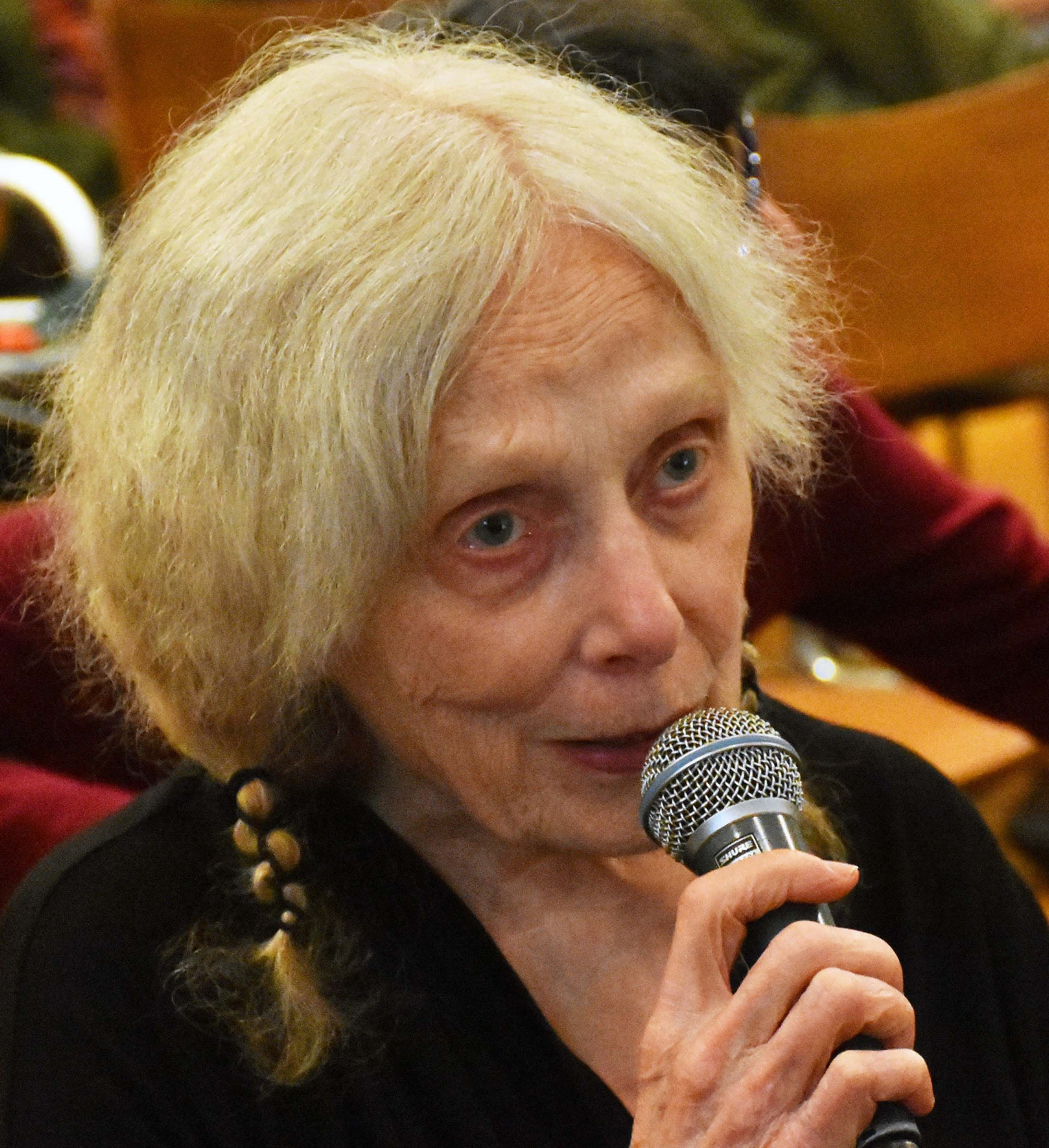
- Franklin speaking at Pastors for Peace Cuba Caravan event at Berkeley Fellowship Hall, Berkeley, CA. June 18, 2019.
- Born: Jane Ferrebee Morgan; April 13, 1934; Bailey, North Carolina, U.S.
- Died: February 23, 2023 (aged 88); El Cerrito, California, U.S.
- Citizenship: United States
- Education: Duke University, B.A., 1955
- Occupations: Historian and author
- Spouse: H. Bruce Franklin
- Writing career
- Language: English

Jane Morgan Franklin (April 13, 1934 – February 23, 2023) was an American historian and scholar with a particular focus on Cuba–United States relations. Her 1992 book, The Cuban Revolution and the United States: A Chronological History, is regarded as encyclopedic, systematic, and based on "extremely wide-ranging research". She was a proponent of normalized relations between the two nations. In addition to Cuba, she wrote about Vietnam, Nicaragua, El Salvador and Panama. Her book Vietnam and America: A Documented History, which she co-edited, was described by The New York Times as a "valuable anthology of crucial texts and records [that] replays the bitter conflict that cost more than 58,000 American lives." During the 1960s, she and her husband H. Bruce Franklin became radicalized because of the Vietnam War and were regarded as leaders in the anti-war movement.

== Scholarship ==
Franklin's scholarship on Cuba-U.S. relations emerged from her affiliation with the Center for Cuban Studies in New York. From 1984 to 2000, she served as a researcher and journal editor there, also leading educational tours to Cuba. She ultimately published an evolving series of five books on the history of international relations between Cuba and the United States in the period after the Cuban revolution of 1959. Her sources included primary historical material from previously classified government documents and contemporaneous journalistic accounts. Events and topics were arranged chronologically and were meticulously sourced and indexed so as to maximize their utility as a tool for journalists and other scholars and researchers.

Her first published chronology of U.S.-Cuban relations, Cuban Foreign Relations 1959-1982, was published in 1984 by the Center for Cuban Studies. It included primary historical materials from the U.S. State Department and the Cuban Ministry of Foreign Information. According to William M. LeoGrande, former dean of the American University School of Public Affairs and a specialist in U.S. foreign policy toward Latin America, this was the first comprehensive listing of the seminal Cuba-U.S. interactions that impacted U.S. foreign policy during the cold war. In his introduction to the volume, LeoGrande called it "both an invaluable resource and an absorbing narrative" of utility for scholars, journalists and ordinary citizens interested in international affairs.

Eight years later, in 1992, Franklin produced a significantly expanded historical overview, The Cuban Revolution and the United States: A Chronological History. In an introductory chapter, Louis A. Perez Jr., a scholar on Cuba at the University of North Carolina, heralded this book as "an essential and long overdue research tool" for scholars.

Subsequent books in 1997 and 2016 further extended Franklin's primary research into the history of relations between Cuba and the United States. Introducing her final book, in 2016, the linguist Noam Chomsky called it "the most accessible, useful and insightful" historical account of Cuba-U.S. relations, offering "a sophisticated analysis" of the evolution of Cuba-U.S. relations over time. That book, Cuba and the U.S. Empire, explores the context and impact of the historic 2014 agreement between U.S. President Barack Obama and Cuban President Fidel Castro to reestablish diplomatic relations and engage in a precedent-setting prisoner swap. "Overnight," Franklin wrote, "the template shifted. U.S.-Cuba relations moved into terrain never traversed before."

Franklin has also published international relations books and articles on Vietnam, Nicaragua, El Salvador and Panama. Her chronology of the history of Panama was excerpted in a report by the Independent Commission of Inquiry on the U.S. Invasion of Panama published by South End Press in 1991. Through first-hand accounts of Panamanian civilians and legal commentary by former U.S. Attorney General Ramsey Clark, this in-depth investigation challenged official portrayals of the Pentagon's "Operation Just Cause" as a battle to restore democracy and combat drug smuggling.

In 1995, she and her husband and two other scholars co-edited a comprehensive volume of primary resources on the history of relations between the United States and Vietnam. The book documents each major stage of the Vietnam War through original source materials and essays by leading experts. The New York Times described the tome as a "valuable anthology of crucial texts and records" of utility for anyone seeking a deeper understanding of the historical conflict.

Franklin also served for many years as a contributing editor of the journal Cuba Update. She was a frequent radio and television commentator and published numerous magazine articles primarily on topics related to Cuba. She traveled to Cuba, Panama and Vietnam, and was well known among politicians and educators in Cuba due to her advocacy of normalized economic relations with the United States. Her work has been translated into French, Italian, German and Spanish.

== Political activism ==
Franklin attributed her lifelong work in anti-war and social justice movements to her childhood experiences of witnessing racial segregation and feeling the horror of Nazi atrocities in World War II. Franklin was further radicalized by the horrors of the Vietnam War. She wrote that she could not help but see the parallels between the photos that had traumatized her as a young girl, of Jewish children being herded down the street by Nazi soldiers, and the images of Vietnamese children being burned by U.S. napalm bombs.

As a young adult, Franklin became active in the Civil Rights movement and, later, in the social movement against the Vietnam War. She helped lead a successful grassroots campaign to stop napalm production at a chemical factory in Redwood City, California in 1966 and was involved in the U.S. Army deserters’ network in Paris in 1967.

She abandoned pacifism during the tumultuous 1960s, and with her husband helped found and lead a revolutionary organization called Venceremos in the San Francisco Bay Area. She was captured in an iconic photo in Time magazine in 1971, clutching an M-1 carbine to her chest. The Franklins were targeted by the FBI as part of its secret COINTELPRO program, and endured years of covert surveillance and harassment.

== Personal life ==
Born Jane Ferrebee Morgan, she grew up on a tobacco farm in Bailey, North Carolina. After graduating from Duke University in 1955, she moved to New York City. She was working in the information department at the United Nations when she met H. Bruce Franklin. The two married in 1956. They had three children and six grandchildren. Franklin died of natural causes in 2023.

After moving to New Jersey in the 1970s, Franklin became active in the arts world. She was a radio and print film critic and served as a juror with the American Film Festival in New York City. She hosted a New Jersey radio show, "Jane Morgan at the Movies." She worked with a nonprofit group called People for Prisoner’s Art to bring the artwork of people behind bars to the attention of the general public. She was also a published poet.

== Books ==
- Cuban Foreign Relations, 1959–1982, by Jane Franklin, Introduction by William LeoGrande, Center for Cuban Studies, 1984.
- The Cuban Revolution and the United States: A Chronological History, by Jane Franklin, Introduction by Louis A. Perez Jr., Ocean Press, 1992, ISBN 1-875284-26-5
- Vietnam and America: A Documented History, edited by Jane Franklin, Marvin Gettleman, Marilyn B. Young, and H. Bruce Franklin, 2nd Edition, Grove Press, 1995, ISBN 9780802133625
- Cuba and the United States: A Chronological History, by Jane Franklin, Ocean Press, 1997, ISBN 9781875284924
- Cuba and the U.S.Empire: A Chronological History, by Jane Franklin, Foreword by Noam Chomsky, Monthly Review Press, 2016, ISBN 9781583676059
- Cuba-Estados Unidos. Cronología de una historia, by Jane Franklin, Ciencia Sociales, 2019,ASIN B07RRZCW3F

=== External links ===
- Jane Franklin's Writings in Progreso Weekly
- Jane Franklin's Website
- Jane Franklin's Obituary Montclair Local
- Jane Franklin's Obituary April Third Movement
