= Mohammad Mokhtari =

Mohammad Mokhtari may refer to:

- Mohammad Mokhtari (writer) (1942–1998), Iranian poet
- Mohammad Mokhtari (protester) (1989–2011), Iranian university student
- Mohammad Mokhtari (footballer) (born 1984), Iranian footballer
- Mohammad Reza Mokhtari, Iranian Greco-Roman wrestler
