= Simon & Schuster, Inc. v. Crime Victims Board =

Simon & Schuster v. Crime Victims Board
- Supreme Court of the United States

Argued October 15, 1991 Decided December 9, 1991
- Full case name: Simon & Schuster, INC., petitioner v. Members of New York State Crime Victims Board et al.
- Citations: 502 U.S. 105 (more) 112 S. Ct. 501; 116 L. Ed. 2d 476; 1991 U.S. LEXIS 7172

Case history
- Prior: 724 F. Supp. 170 (S.D.N.Y. 1989); affirmed, 916 F.2d 777 (2d Cir. 1990); cert. granted, 498 U.S. 1081 (1991).

Holding
- The New York Son of Sam law violated the First Amendment.

Court membership
- Chief Justice William Rehnquist Associate Justices Byron White · Harry Blackmun; John P. Stevens · Sandra Day O'Connor; Antonin Scalia · Anthony Kennedy; David Souter · Clarence Thomas

Case opinions
- Majority: O'Connor, joined by Rehnquist, White, Stevens, Scalia, Souter
- Concurrence: Blackmun
- Concurrence: Kennedy
- Thomas took no part in the consideration or decision of the case.

Laws applied
- U.S. Const. amend. I, Son of Sam law

Simon & Schuster v. Crime Victims Board, 502 U.S. 105 (1991), was a Supreme Court case dealing with Son of Sam laws, which are state laws that prevent convicted criminals from publishing books about their crime for profit. Simon & Schuster challenged the law's application to profits from Nicholas Pileggi's book Wiseguy: Life in a Mafia Family, which was written with paid assistance from former mobster Henry Hill. The court struck down the Son of Sam law in New York on the ground that the law was violative of the First Amendment, which protects free speech. Nevertheless, similar laws in other states remain unchallenged. The opinion of the court was written by Sandra Day O'Connor.

In the wake of this case, New York modified its law to apply to any economic benefits derived from criminal activities, not just proceeds from publications.
