= Patricia McConnel =

American writer

Patricia McConnel (born 1931) is an American writer living in Arizona, best known for her autobiographical novel Sing Soft, Sing Loud (1989) based on her life as a drug mule and prisoner.

== Awards ==
- Awarded two creative writing fellowships from the National Endowment for the Arts
- 1984 The Avarian was selected as one of the Ten best PEN short stories of 1984
