= Bahram Sadeghi =

Iranian poet and writer

‌Bahram Sadeghi
- Born: 8 January 1937; Najafabad, Iran
- Died: 3 January 1985 (aged 47); Tehran
- Occupation: Writer
- Writing career
- Notable work: Malakout
- Literary movement: Persian literature

Bahram Sadeghi (Persian: بهرام صادقی, romanized: Bahrām Sadeqī; 8 January 1937, in Najaf-Ābād, Isfahan – 3 January 1985, in Tehran) was an Iranian poet and modernist fiction writer. Sadeghi's characters, many of them failed government employees and frustrated intellectuals, are consumed by anxiety and terror, and at times even undergo Kafkaesque transmutations and mutilations.

== Works ==
=== Novella ===
- The Heavenly Kingdom (in Persian: ملکوت)

=== Short story collection ===
- The Trench and the Empty Canteens (in Persian:سنگر و قمقمه‌های خالی)

=== Short stories ===
- Tomorrow is on the way
- Obsession
- Action-packed
- The evening prayer
- Counter-impact
- Mr. writer has just started to write
