= Mahmoud Dowlatabadi =

Iranian writer and actor (born 1940)

- محمود دولت‌آبادی
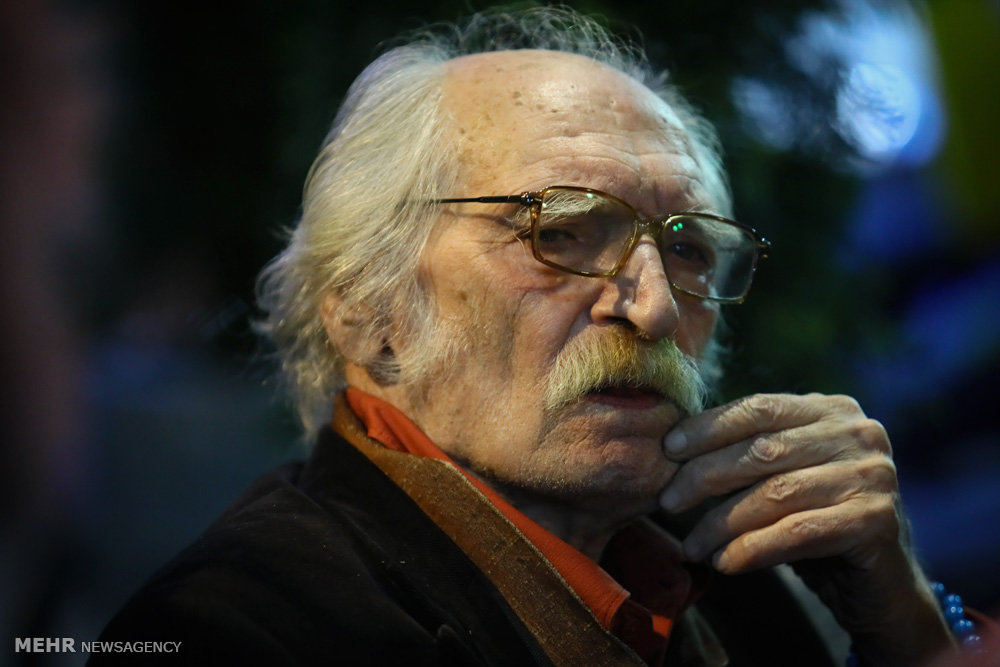
- Mahmoud Dowlatabadi
- Born: 1 August 1940 (age 86); Sabzevar, Iran
- Occupations: Writer, actor
- Spouse: Mehr Azar Maher (m. 1966)
- Children: 3
- Relatives: Abdolrasoul Dowlatabadi (father); Fatemeh Dowlatabadi (mother)
- Writing career
- Notable works: Kelidar; Missing Soluch
- Notable awards: Man Asian Literary Prize; Jan Michalski Prize for Literature; Legion of Honour
- Movement: Persian literature
- Website: www.mimdowlatabadi.com

Mahmoud Dowlatabadi (Persian: محمود دولت‌آبادی, romanized: Mahmud Dowlatâbâdi; born 1 August 1940 in Dowlatabad, Sabzevar) is an Iranian writer and actor, known for his promotion of social and artistic freedom in contemporary Iran and his realist depictions of rural life, drawn from personal experience.

== Early life and education ==
Mahmoud Dowlatabadi was born into a family of shoemakers in Dowlatabad, a remote village in Sabzevar, the northwestern part of Khorasan Province, Iran. He worked as a farmhand and attended Mas'ud Salman Elementary School. Books were a revelation to the young boy. He "read all the romances [available]... around the village". He "read on the roof of the house with a lamp…read War and Peace that way" while living in Tehran. Though his father had little formal education, he introduced Dowlatabadi to the Persian classical poets, Saadi Shirazi, Hafez, and Ferdowsi. His father generally spoke in the language of the great poets.

Nahid Mozaffari, who edited a PEN anthology of Iranian literature, said that Dowlatabadi "has an incredible memory of folklore, which probably came from his days as an actor or from his origins, as somebody who didn't have a formal education, who learned things by memorizing the local poetry and hearing the local stories."

As a teenager, Dowlatabadi took up a trade like his father and opened a barbershop. One afternoon, he found himself hopelessly bored. He closed the shop, gave the keys to a boy, and told him to tell his father, "Mahmoud's left." He caught a ride to Mashhad, where he worked for a year before leaving for Tehran to pursue theatre. Dowlatabadi worked there for a year before he could attend theatre classes. When he did, he rose to the top of his class, still doing numerous other jobs. He was an actor---and a shoemaker, barber, bicycle repairman, street barker, worker in cotton factory, and cinema ticket taker. Around this time he also ventured into journalism, fiction writing, and screenplays. He said in an interview "whenever I was done with work and wasn't preoccupied with finding food and so on, I would sit down and just write".

== Career ==
Dowlatabadi performed Brecht (e.g. The Visions of Simone Machard), Arthur Miller (e.g. A View from the Bridge) and Bahram Beyzai (e.g. The Marionettes). He was arrested by the Savak, the Shah's secret police force in 1974. Dowlatabad's novels also attracted the attention of local police. When he asked what was his crime, they told him, "Nothing, but everyone we arrest seems to have copies of your novels so that makes you provocative to revolutionaries." He was in prison for two years.

Towards the end of his incarceration, Dowlatabadi said "The story of Missing Soluch came to me all at once, and I wrote the entire work in my head." Dowlatabadi couldn't write anything down while in prison. He "become restless". One of the prisoners...said to him, 'You used to be so good at putting up with prison, now why're you so impatient?' He replied that "my anxiety isn't related to prison and all that came with it, but about something else entirely. I had to write this book." When he was finally released, he wrote Missing Soluch in 70 nights. It later became his first novel published in English, preceding The Colonel.

In 2020, he wrote and recited a work called Soldier (Half-Burned boots) for the Art of Peace global project, composed and arranged by Mehran Alirezaei. He has collaborated with this project.

== Major works ==
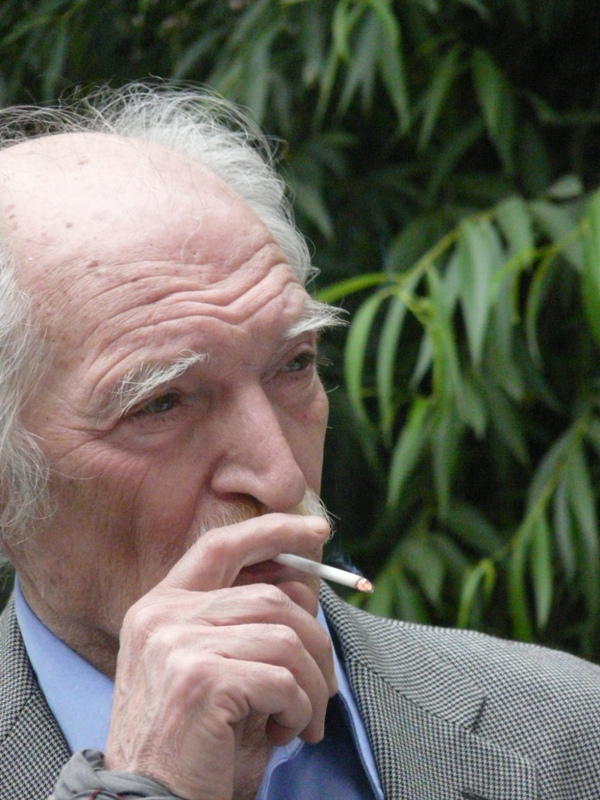
Dowlatabadi in 2011

=== Kelidar ===
Kelidar is a saga about a Kurdish nomadic family that spans 10 books and 2,590 pages. Encyclopædia Iranica praises its "heroic, lyrical, and sensual" language. The story is tremendously popular among Iranians due to "its detailed portrayal of political and social upheaval." Dowlatabadi spent over a decade crafting the tale. "I spent fifteen years preparing, writing short stories, sometimes writing works that were a little longer, the grounds towards what would become Kelidar," he said.

=== Missing Soluch ===
In Missing Soluch, an impoverished woman raises her children in an isolated village after the unexplained disappearance of her husband, Soluch. Though the idea for the novel first came to Dowlatabadi in prison, its origins trace back to his childhood. "My mother used to talk about a woman in the village whose husband had disappeared and had left her alone. She was left to raise several children on her own. Since she didn't want the village to pity her, she would take a bit of lamb's fat and melt it and then toss a handful of dry grass or something into the pan and put this in the oven, so that with the smoke that would come out of the oven the neighbors might think that she was cooking a meat stew for her children that night," he told an interviewer. Missing Soluch was his first work translated into English.

=== The Colonel ===
The Colonel is a novel about nation, history, and family, beginning on a rainy night when two policemen summon the Colonel to collect the tortured body of his daughter, a victim of the Islamic Revolution. Dowlatabadi wrote the novel in the 1980s, when intellectuals were in danger of execution. "I hid it in a drawer when I finished it," he said. Though it is published abroad in English, the novel is not available in Iran, in Persian. "I did not even want to have this on their radar," he said. "Either they would take me to prison or prevent me from working. They would have their ways." The novel was first published in Germany, later in the UK and United States.

Shargh newspaper published the news of the Colonel Opera in 2022:

Der Colonel Oper (version 2018) composed by Siamak Fallahi and the libretto is written by Angelika Messner based on the novel Colonel by Mahmoud Dowlatabadi. The opera have Five acts and 12 Characters which are all accompanied by singers, actors, choirs, large orchestras, and video art on stage. The composer used a new technique which led to a new event in opera and referred to it as the Reformation.

=== Thirst ===
Thirst (Persian: Besmel) is a novel of the Iran–Iraq War (1980–1988). It is written from the perspectives of two Iraqi and Iranian writers. The original Persian title refers to the concept of 'besmel' explained in a footnote as: "the supplication required in Islam before the sacrifice of any animal". It is used repeatedly in the text, as the characters find it applies to them.

== Influence ==
Dowlatabadi is celebrated as one of the most important writers in contemporary Iran, particularly for his use of language. He elevates rural speech, drawing on the rich, lyrical tradition of Persian poetry. He "examines the complexities and moral ambiguities of the experience of the poor and forgotten, mixing the brutality of that world with the lyricism of the Persian language," said Kamran Rastegar, a translator of Dowlatabadi's work. When Tom Patterdale translated Dowlatabadi's The Colonel, he avoided Latinate English words in favor of Anglo-Saxon ones, hoping to reproduce the effect Dowlatabadi's "rough and ready" prose. Most other Iranian writers come from solidly middle-class backgrounds, with urban educations. Because of his rural background, Dowlatabadi stands out as a unique voice. He has also garnered praise internationally, with Kirkus Reviews calling The Colonel, "A demanding and richly composed book by a novelist who stands apart." The Independent described the novel as "passionate," and emphasized, "It's about time that everyone even remotely interested in Iran read this novel."

Safarnameh Sistan, a documentary which was made by Ali Zare Ghanat Nowi in 2011, about a trip to Sistan and meeting Balochi ethnics, illustrating the very hard life of people living there, giving information about their life style in such a dry area, is a free adaptation from Meet the Baloch People by Mahmoud Dowlatabadi.

== Awards and honors ==
- 2009 Haus der Kulturen Berlin International Literary Award, shortlist, The Colonel
- 2011 Man Asian Literary Prize, longlist, The Colonel
- 2012 Hooshang Golshiri Literary Award, Lifetime Achievement
- 2013 Jan Michalski Prize for Literature, winner, The Colonel
- 2014 Legion of Honour

In August 2014, Iran issued a commemorative postage stamp for writer Mahmoud Dowlatabadi.

== Prose Fiction ==
=== Short stories ===
- ته شب (At the End of the Night) - 1961
- هجرت سلیمان (The Migration of Sulaimaan) - 1972
- آهوی بخت من گزل (My Lucky Doe, Gazelle) - 1989
- بنی‌آدم (The Children of Aadam/Humans) - 2015

=== Collections ===
- لایه‌های بیابانی (Desert Layers) (سایه‌های خسته [Tired Shadows], [Iddbaar]ادبار, [At the foot of the Tomb of the Imaamzaadeh Shu'aibb] بند, پای گلدستۀ امامزاده شعیب [Strap], [Desert]بیابانی) - 1968
- کارنامه سپنج (The Career of Sepanj) - includes all short stories (except "My Lucky Doe, Gazelle" and "The Children of Adam"), novellas, and a travelogue - 1989
- گلدسته‌ها و سایه‌ها (Garlands and Shadows) - 2005
- دُرّ یتیم (خشکیدن آب دهان عنکبوت) (The Drool of the Orphan [Drying Up the Saliva of the Spider]) - unknown date of publication

=== Novellas ===
- سفر (The Journey) - 1968
- آوسنه بابا سبحان (Dear Baabaa Subbhaan) - 1968
- گاواربان (Cowherd/Shepherd) - 1972
- باشبیرو (Baashabeeroo) - 1972
- عقیل، عقیل ('Aqeel, 'Aqeel) - 1972
- از خم چنبر (From the Bend of the Circle) - 1977
- آن مادیان سرخ‌یال (That Red-Maned Mare) - mid-1990s
- روز و شب یوسف (The Day and Night of Yoosuf) - 2004

=== Novels ===
- جای خالی سلوچ (Missing Soluch) - 1979
- کلیدر (Kaleedar) - 5 volumes, 10 parts - 1984
- سلوک (Conduct/Behaviour) - 2003
- طریق بسمل شدن (The {Shia} Way to Say Basmalah [When Slaughtering Animals]/Thirst) - written in 2004-2006, published in 2018
- زوال کلنل (The Decline of the Colonel/The Colonel) - 2009
- وزیری امیر حسنک (Wazeeree Ameer Hasanak) - 2013
- بیرونِ در (Outside the Door) - 2019
- اسب‌ها اسب‌ها از کنار یکدیگر (Horses and Horses, Next to Each Other) - autobiographical - 2020

=== Novel Trilogy ===
- روزگار سپری‌شده مردم سالخورده (The Bygone Days of the Old People) - 1980-98
1. اقلیمِ باد (The Realm of the Wind) - 1980
2. برزخِ خس (The Barrier of Dry Grass/Straw) - 1993
3. پایان جغد (The Demise of the Owl) - 1998

== Translations ==
=== English ===
- In the United States, Missing Soluch was translated into English by Kamran Rastegar, 2007.
- In the United Kingdom, The Colonel was translated into English by Tom Patterdale, 2012.
- In the United Kingdom, Thirst was translated into English by Martin E. Weir, 2014.

=== Other Languages ===
- In Sweden "Missing Soluch" was translated into Swedish by Stefan Lindgren as "Den tomma platsen". Stockholm, Ordfront, 1999.
- In Norway, Missing Soluch was translated into Norwegian by N. Zandjani as Den tomme plassen etter Soluch. Oslo, Solum forlag 2008.
- In Switzerland, Kelidar was translated into German by Sigrid Lutfi, Unionsverlag 1999.
- In Iraqi Kurdistan, Kelidar was translated into Central Kurdish by Siyaamand Shaasawaaree (2012) by Sardam Publishers.
- In Switzerland, The Colonel was translated into German by Bahman Nirumand, Unionsverlag, 2009.
- In Italy, The Colonel was translated into Italian as Il Colonnello by Tom Patterdale in the early 2010s.
- In Israel, The Colonel was translated into Hebrew by Orly Noy as "שקיעת הקולונל" (The Decline of the Colonel) translated. Am Oved Publishing, 2012.
- In Bosnia and Herzegovina, The Colonel was translated into Bosnian by Mahmood Kodrić, Buybook 2014.
- In Pakistan, Gaawaaribaan novella translated in Urdu entitled Charwaahaa (چرواہا) by Shaheed Maanik Saglha in 2024. (Maanik is a young Pakistani author, translator and columnist.)

== Relevant relevant literature ==
- Salahi, Rajabali, Ali Tasnimi, Mehyar Alavi Moghaddam, and Mahmoud Firouzi Moghaddam. "The Thematic Classification of Proverbs and Ironies in Selected Novels of Mahmoud Dowlatabadi: The Case of Kelidar, Missing Salouch, and The Passed Days of Old People." Culture and Folk Literature E-ISSN: 2423-7000, Vol. 10, No. 43, April – May 2022, (2022): 61-89.
