= Son of Sam law =

American law that prevents criminals from profiting from their crimes

A Son of Sam law (American English; also known as a notoriety-for-profit law) is a law designed to keep criminals from profiting from the publicity of their crimes; for instance, by selling their stories to publishers. Such laws often authorize the state to seize money earned from deals such as book/film biographies and paid interviews and use it to compensate the criminal's victims.

These laws have been criticized as violating the free-speech guarantee of the First Amendment to the United States Constitution. The original and namesake law from New York State was ruled unconstitutional on those grounds by the Supreme Court of the United States. New York and other states have since passed laws with similar goals that attempt to skirt the Court's decision.

== History ==
The term "Son of Sam" is derived from the first law of this type, targeted at serial killer David Berkowitz, who used the name "Son of Sam" during his notorious murder spree in mid-1970s New York City. After his arrest in August 1977, the intense media interest in the case led to widespread speculation that he might sell his story to a writer or filmmaker. Although Berkowitz denied wanting any kind of deal, the New York State Legislature swiftly passed preemptive legal statutes anyway, the first legal restriction of its kind in the U.S. The existing "general law which sought to compensate victims of a crime through administrative agency" was amended August 11, 1977, the day after Berkowitz's arrest, resulting in what is referred to as "the original 'Son of Sam' law" which became the model for 42 other similar state and federal laws. The original New York law was invoked in New York eleven times between 1977 and 1990, including against Mark David Chapman, the murderer of musician John Lennon.

Critics argued that the law infringed on freedom of speech and therefore violated the First Amendment. Further they say that "Son of Sam" laws take away the financial incentive for many criminals to tell their stories, some of which (such as the Watergate scandal) were of vital interest to the general public.

In 1987, lawyers for publishing company Simon & Schuster sued the New York authorities to prevent enforcement of the Son of Sam law with respect to a book they were about to publish called Wiseguy, written by Nicholas Pileggi. The book was about ex-mobster Henry Hill. It was adapted for the film Goodfellas.

The case reached the U.S. Supreme Court in 1991. In Simon & Schuster v. Crime Victims Board, the Court ruled 8-0 that the law was unconstitutional. The Court held that the law was overinclusive and would have prevented the publication of such works as The Autobiography of Malcolm X, Thoreau's Civil Disobedience, and even The Confessions of Saint Augustine.

Similarly, the state of California's Son of Sam law was struck down in 2002 after being used against Barry Keenan, one of the men who kidnapped Frank Sinatra Jr. in 1963.

After numerous revisions, New York adopted a new "Son of Sam" law in 2001. This law requires that victims of crimes be notified whenever a person convicted of a crime receives $10,000 (US) or more from virtually any source. The law attaches a springing statute of limitations, giving victims an extended period of time to sue the perpetrator of the crime in civil court for their crimes and to potentially receive damages. This law also authorizes a state agency, the Crime Victims' Board, to act on the victims' behalf in some limited circumstances. Thus far, this current New York law has survived court scrutiny, largely because profit is targeted instead of speech.

== Related concepts ==
Regardless of whether a state has a formal Son of Sam law, victims and their families may use civil lawsuits for monetary damages that effectively preclude a wrongdoer (or accused wrongdoer) from profiting from their crime. A prominent example is the litigation between the family of Ron Goldman and O. J. Simpson following Simpson's acquittal for Goldman's murder. Goldman's family won a wrongful death claim against Simpson for more than $30 million. When Simpson later published a book about the murder, If I Did It, a court awarded the book's rights to the Goldman family to help satisfy the judgment.

In high-profile criminal cases and cases that are closely tied to national security, such as convictions for terrorism and espionage, a "Son of Sam clause" has been included in plea bargains. Examples include John Walker Lindh (an American who aided the Taliban in Afghanistan) and Harold James Nicholson (a Central Intelligence Agency officer who spied for Russia). As a result of their plea bargains, any and all profits made from book deals or movie rights would be turned over to the U.S. Treasury. Neither the convicts nor their families would be able to profit.

== See also ==
- Eighth Amendment to the United States Constitution
- "Don't Name Them" campaign - voluntary denial of notoriety to mass shooters
