= Sunsara Taylor =

American activist

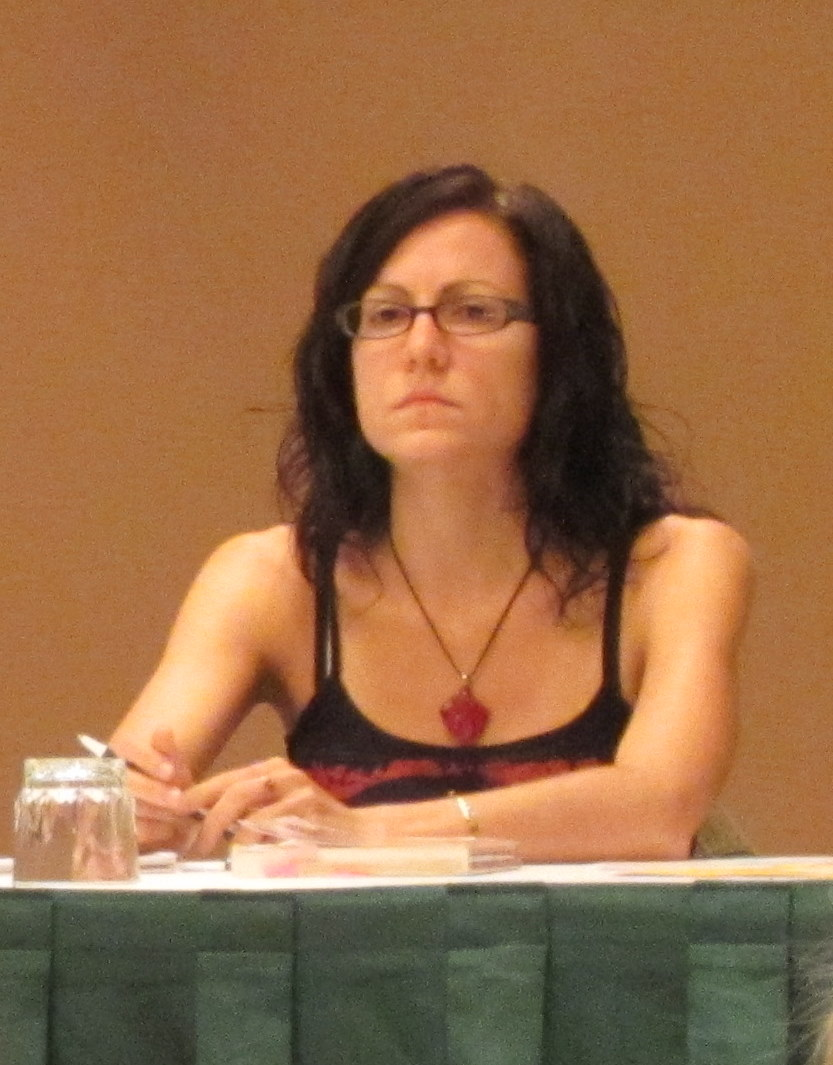
- Taylor pictured in 2011
- Years active: 2006–present
- Political party: Revolutionary Communist Party, USA
- Website: twitter.com/sunsarataylor

Sunsara Taylor is an American far-left political activist, and member of the Revolutionary Communist Party, USA. She has been a vocal opponent of the anti-abortion movement, the sex industry, and U.S. imperialism, having previously debated these topics on Fox News.

== Activism ==
Taylor has been a co-host of The RNL – Revolution, Nothing Less – Show, a weekly YouTube show that advocates for global communist revolution grounded in Bob Avakian's work, since its founding in 2020. Many of the groups she leads have been described as front groups for RevCom and Avakian.

In 2005, Taylor co-founded World Can't Wait. In a 2006 article for the group, "Comparing Bush to Hitler: Lessons for Today", she wrote that the presidency of George W. Bush was "fascistic", and called for Bush to be "driven from office".

Taylor is also a frontwoman for Stop Patriarchy and led the group's 2013 promotional tour, the Abortion Rights Freedom Ride. Stop Patriarchy has been described as the "pro-choice group Texas feminists hate" and has been criticized by Texans for Reproductive Justice for its "messaging, tactics, dishonesty, and racism". The group has elicited controversy for wearing chains and chanting, "Forced motherhood is female enslavement!" In response, Taylor accused Texans for Reproductive Justice of hypocrisy, citing their use of a flag that flew over half of Mexico and calling their hypocrisy "stunning". Taylor also led protests against the release of the film Fifty Shades of Grey with Stop Patriarchy.

In December 2015, Taylor and longtime activist Carl Dix announced the formation of Refuse Fascism, with the aim of stopping Donald Trump from being elected president in 2016. As a representative of the group, she spoke at the 2017 Women's March on Washington, protested outside Trump Tower, tweeted video of protesters burning the U.S. flag, and drew media attention for comparing Donald Trump to Adolf Hitler during an appearance on Tucker Carlson Tonight.

In an interview with KPFK, Taylor called for Trump to be "driven from office".

On August 12, 2018, Taylor and other supporters of Refuse Fascism and the RCP took part in protests organized against the far-right Unite the Right 2 rally in Washington, D.C.

In January 2022, Taylor, Merle Hoffman, and other pro-abortion rights activists initiated Rise Up 4 Abortion Rights (RU4AR), an ad-hoc coalition formed to launch mass protests aimed at preventing the U.S. Supreme Court from overturning Roe v. Wade, affecting abortion rights in the United States. RU4AR's launching statement was signed by prominent figures in the arts, law, and the feminist movement, including Rosanna Arquette, Cornel West, Gloria Steinem, and V (formerly Eve Ensler).

Throughout 2022, Taylor and other members of RU4AR led pro-abortion rights protests at places including St. Patrick’s Cathedral and Union Square in New York City. The group has been accused of being a front for the Revolutionary Communist Party and diverting money away from abortion providers to RevCom's own operating structure, a charge that Taylor and her colleagues strenuously deny.

=== 2016 RCP protests at the Republican National Convention ===
During the 2016 Republican National Convention, Taylor served as a spokesperson for the Revolutionary Communist Party USA, addressing reporters outside the Cleveland Justice Center in what the Los Angeles Times called a rare moment of attention for the party, and declaring that "America was never great". She later alleged Cleveland police had lied when they said they had intervened to stop a flag burning due to a protester accidentally setting himself on fire.

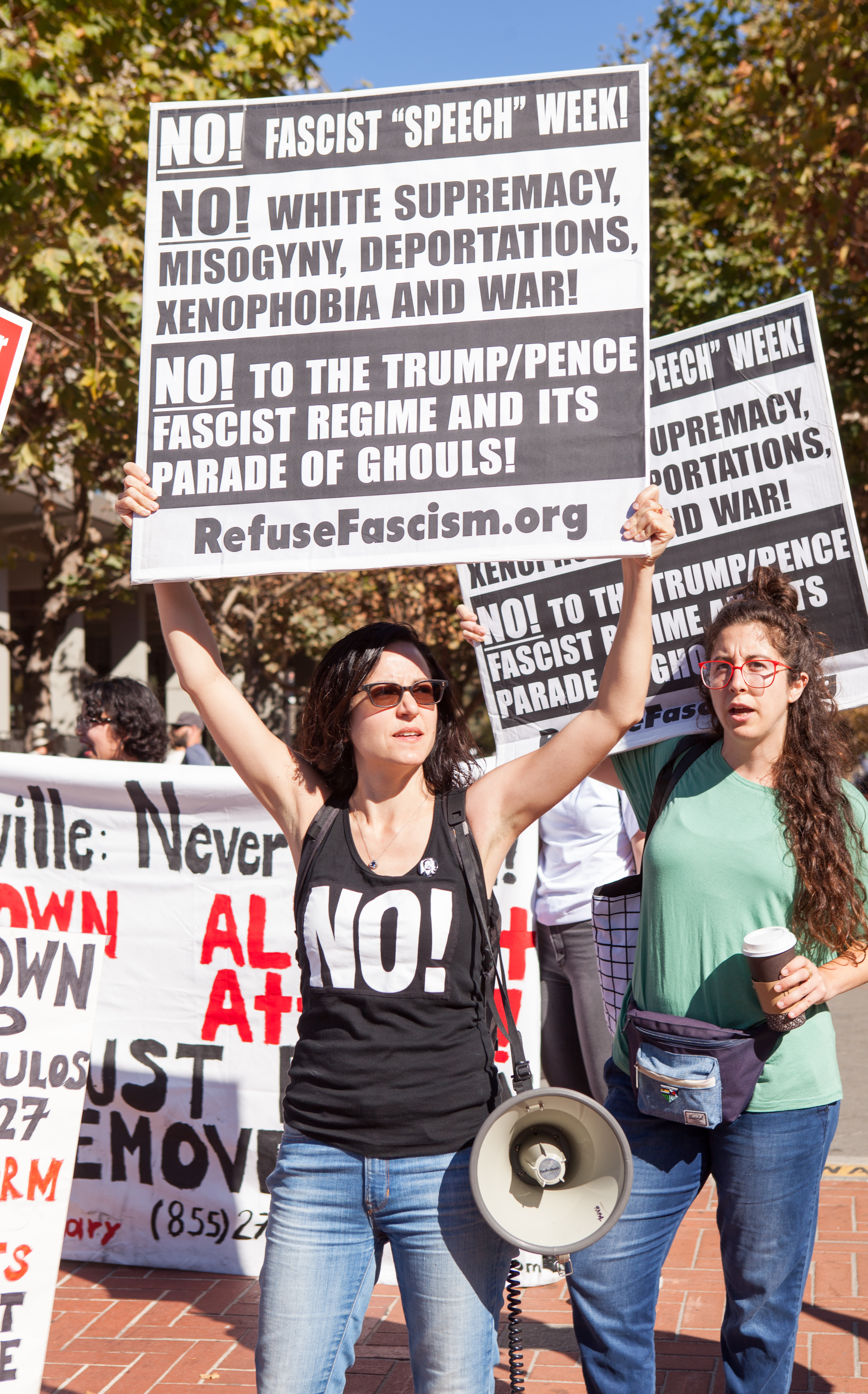
Taylor holds a sign reading "No! Fascist 'Speech' Week" on the sidewalk outside Sproul Plaza, UC Berkeley, September 2017.

== Writing and commentary ==
Taylor hosts the weekly WBAI-FM radio show We Only Want The World, and formerly co-hosted Equal Time for Free Thought on the same station. She has written for Revolution and Truthdig, and been featured as a guest on The O'Reilly Factor, Tucker Carlson, the Sean Hannity Show, and other Fox shows.

- "Government Policies Should Not Treat Women as Childbearing Vessels." In Women's Issues in Margaret Atwood's The Handmaid's Tale, ed. David Erik Nelson (Greenhaven Publishing, 2011), 133-37. ISBN 9780737758009.
- "A Response to Jezebel by Leaders of Rise Up 4 Abortion Rights." With Lori Sokol and Merle Hoffman. Counterpunch June 17, 2022.
