= New synthesis =

New synthesis may refer to:

- In biology, the modern evolutionary synthesis joins elements of different theories in biology to describe evolution
- In economics, the new neoclassical synthesis that fuses elements of new Keynesianism with new classical macroeconomic thought
- The New Synthesis, a Maoist school of thought created by Bob Avakian
