= The World Can't Wait =

- Formation: September 2005
- Headquarters: New York City
- Methods: Nonviolent resistance, political protest
- Director: Debra Sweet
- Key people: Debra Sweet, Sunsara Taylor, Tomas Olmos, Dennis Loo
- Parent organization: RCP

The World Can't Wait (WCW) is a coalition group in the United States dedicated to mobilizing mass resistance to what it describes as crimes committed by the US government. Initially formed as an ad-hoc coalition to organize mass protests to force the George W. Bush Administration from office, WCW has also protested against the Iraq and Afghanistan wars, the continued operation of the Guantanamo Bay prison, the use of torture by the U.S. government under both the Bush and Obama administrations, and against anti-abortion groups and legislation.

== History ==
=== Formation and Call ===
World Can't Wait was officially formed in September 2005, at a meeting of hundreds in New York City chaired by Sunsara Taylor and Debra Sweet, two activists and supporters of the Revolutionary Communist Party, USA. WCW attempted during the Bush years to create a mass popular movement strong enough to force George W. Bush and Richard Cheney from office in disgrace. According to its original (2005) mission statement, by organizing people living in the United States, WCW seeks "to create a political situation where the Bush administration's program is repudiated, where Bush himself is driven from office, and where the whole direction he has been taking U.S. society is reversed." This statement, known as the "Call" was signed by prominent people in both activist circles and in the arts, such as Mark Ruffalo, Cindy Sheehan, Jane Fonda, Gore Vidal, Harold Pinter, Daniel Ellsberg, Eve Ensler, and Tom Morello, among thousands of others.

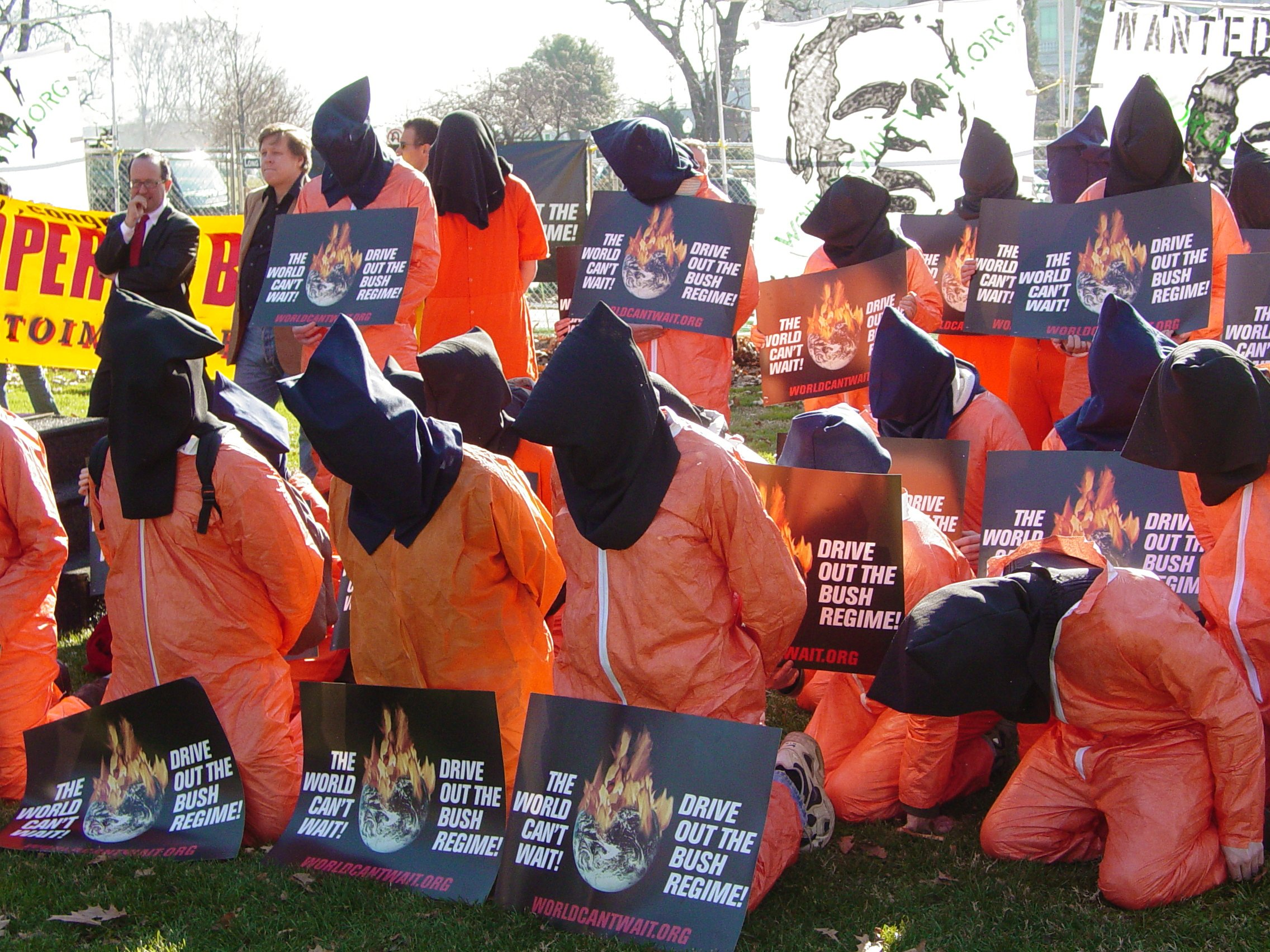
World Can't Wait protesters at a January 4, 2007 rally in Upper Senate Park.

WCW levied many accusations against the Bush administration, including: the Iraq War, prisoner abuse, torture of military detainees, the abrogation of their rights to habeas corpus, ubiquitous domestic wire-tapping and surveillance activities ordered personally by the President, the administration's response to Hurricane Katrina, and the administration's support for anti-abortion legislation which they state has a basis in the goals of the Christian Right.

WCW has been described as a Revolutionary Communist Party (RCP) "affiliate". WCW was initiated by the RCP. Its website said it had "Greens, Christians, Republicans, anarchists, Muslims, Jews, feminists, Democrats, pacifists, and people who claim no affiliation" as members. Organizing in high schools, college campuses and on the Internet, by October 2006, the group gathered 24,000 supporters, including actor Sean Penn, writers Studs Terkel and Eve Ensler, Democratic state assemblyman Mark Leno and anti-war protester Cindy Sheehan, and was able to organize protests in 150 cities across the United States, Canada and Switzerland. According to WCW director Debra Sweet, "In the beginning, we were what you might call the voice-of-conscience usual suspects. Since then, we've been opening our umbrella wider."

World Can't Wait stated during the 2008 presidential race that Barack Obama would not be a redemptive figure.

=== Activities Post-Bush Administration ===
In 2009 the WCW adopted a new mission statement that incorporated the major elements of its original statement and ended with: “This direction cannot and will not be reversed by leaders who tell us to seek common ground with fascists, religious fanatics, and empire. It can only be possible by the people building a community of resistance - an independent mass movement of people - acting in the interests of humanity to stop, and demand prosecution, of these crimes.”

In the fall of 2010 WCW took out an ad entitled "Crimes Are Crimes No Matter Who Does Them," stating that the Obama administration "either continued Bush policies or went even further than Bush". The ad appeared in the New York Review of Books, The Nation and the New York Times.

WCW shares a mailing address on West Broadway with Refuse Fascism.

== Events organized ==
- November 2, 2005: Demonstrations attended in protest of the anniversary of the 2004 presidential elections; some 2,000 participate in each of the New York City and San Francisco events, with 1,200 in Los Angeles.
- January 31, 2006: Demonstrations attended in protest of President George W. Bush's State of the Union address.
- February 4, 2006: Demonstration in Washington, D.C. outside the White House.
- May 12, 2006: Demonstration at Wachovia Stadium to protest Battle Cry.
- January 4, 2007: Rally in Upper Senate Park in Washington, D.C. at noon on the opening day of the 110th United States Congress.
- January 23, 2007: Demonstrations attended in protest of Bush's State of the Union address.
- February 17, 2007: "Emergency Summit to Impeach Bush for War Crimes" was held in New York City.
- January 18, 2009: Disruption of Rick Warren's King Memorial Speech, Atlanta.
- March 19, 2009: First national day of protest against the wars under President Barack Obama. New York City event including a rally at Union Square and a march to the US Armed Forces Recruiting Center in Times Square.
- December 1 and 2, 2009: World Can't Wait participated, with other groups, in the demonstrations outside Obama's West Point announcement of the increase in troops to Afghanistan, and the protests in New York City the day after.

== See also ==
- List of anti-war organizations
- Refuse Fascism
- Sunsara Taylor
