= On the Issues (magazine) =

News and opinion magazine

- Fall 1992 cover of On the Issues
- Editor-in-Chief: Merle Hoffman
- Categories: Politics, society, economics, medicine, interpersonal relationships, media, and the arts
- Frequency: Quarterly
- Circulation: 15,285 in 1995
- Publisher: Merle Hoffman
- Founder: Merle Hoffman
- Founded: 1983
- Final issue: 2008
- Company: Choices Women's Medical Center
- Country: US
- Based in: Long Island City, New York
- Language: English
- Website: www.ontheissuesmagazine.com
- ISSN: 0895-6014
- OCLC: 29460383

On the Issues is an online-only progressive feminist news and opinion magazine founded in 1983 as a print magazine: On the Issues: The Progressive Woman's Quarterly.

== History ==
On the Issues was started by social psychologist Merle Hoffman in 1983 as a quarterly print magazine intended for an audience of "thinking feminists". The magazine has operated out of Forest Hills, New York, and also out of Flushing. It was primarily written by freelance writers.

Earlier in 1971, Hoffman established Choices Women's Medical Center. A pro-choice activist, Hoffman has said that "women's lives, women's thinking, women's votes, women's power matter." In 1999, Hoffman added an online component to the magazine.

In 2008 after 25 years of publishing, Hoffman ceased printing the magazine and transferred it to an online-only format based in Long Island City, New York.

== Content ==
On the Issues was founded as a progressive alternative to mainstream media coverage. The first number carried articles about the beginnings of AIDS and about the newly described condition of premenstrual syndrome (PMS). Among many other topics covered in the magazine have been surgical practices on genitals, domestic violence and eco-feminism. Every issue includes a section reporting recent developments in the reproductive rights debate.

Hoffman is an animal rights feminist; the magazine has carried articles sympathetic to animal rights. Animal rights advocates such as Carol J. Adams, Joan Dunayer and Roberta Kalechofsky have contributed articles.

== Reception ==
Professor Gerald Sussman of Portland State University described the magazine as "Gramscian", that is, promoting revolutionary change but within the existing political structure, as described by Italian political theorist Antonio Gramsci. Leftist Mother Jones magazine described On the Issues as "a strong feminist voice that's reasoned, literate, highly readable, and tackles topics of concern to women." The Utne Reader praised On the Issues as "articulat[ing] the female experience through many feminist voices and without resorting to male-bashing."

== Contributors ==
- Cindy Cooper, Managing Editor
- Sarah Browning, Poetry co-editor
- Judith Arcana, Poetry co-editor
- Mark D. Phillips, Technical and creative design director
- Linda Stein, Art editor
- Eleanor Bader, Contributing editor
- Vanessa Valenti, Social media editor
- Elayne Rapping
- Leslie Cagan
- Carol J. Adams
- Carol Downer
- Margaret Morganroth Gullette
- Amanda Marcotte
- Laura Whitehorn
- Ursula K. Le Guin
- Toi Derricotte
- Helène Aylon
- Guerrilla Girls
- Jesus Barraza
- Melanie Cervantes
- Favianna Rodriguez
- Naomi Wolf
- John Stoltenberg
- Roberta Kalechofsky
- Marcy Bloom
- Sonia Pressman Fuentes
- Joan Dunayer
- Barbara Katz Rothman
- Amy Goodman
