= Green scarf =

Symbol of the abortion-rights movements

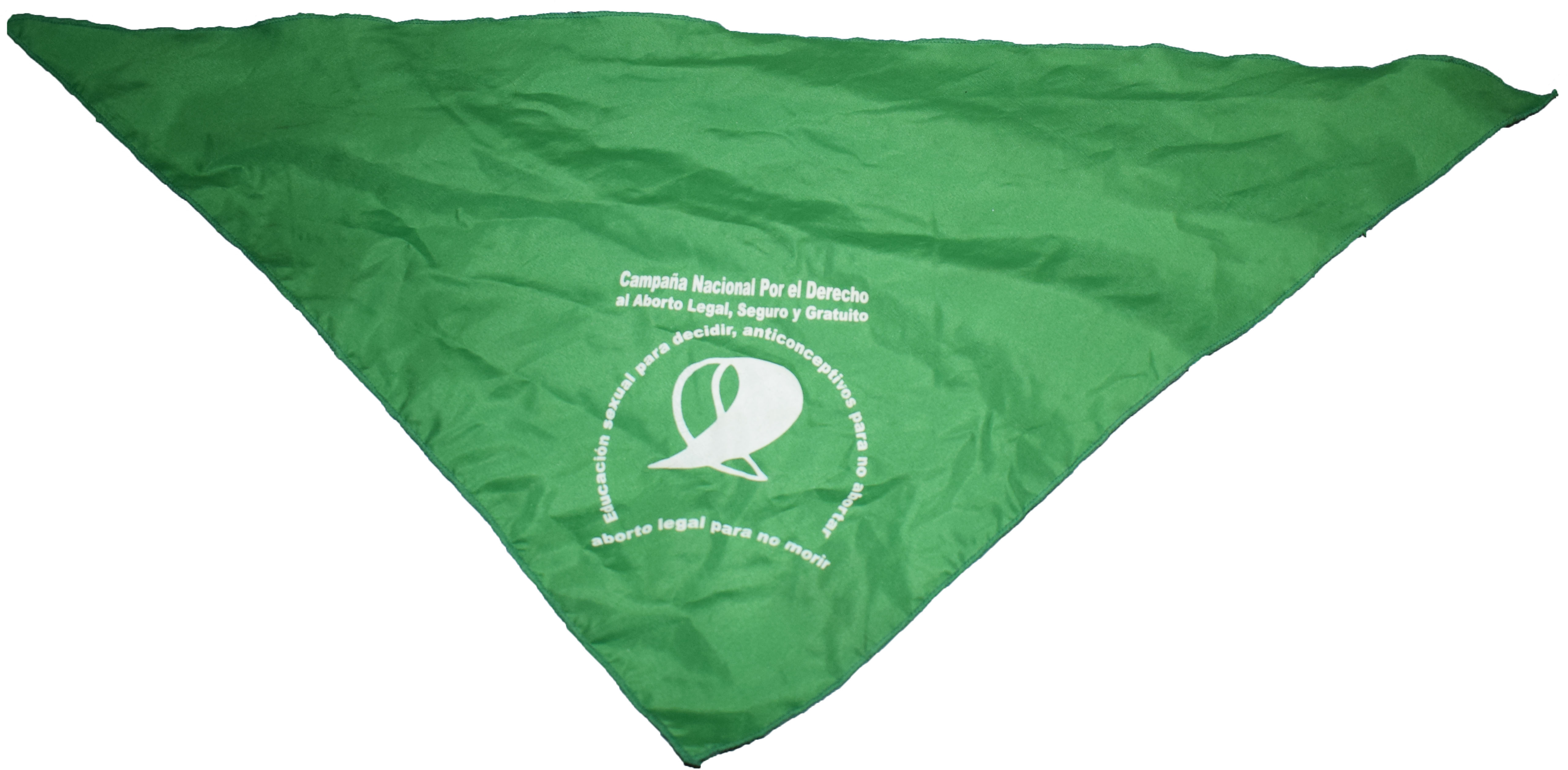
The original green scarf with the legend, "Sex education to decide, contraceptives to avoid abortion, legal abortion to avoid death".

The green scarf (Spanish: pañuelo verde) is a symbol of the abortion-rights movements, created in Argentina in 2003 and popularized since 2018 throughout Latin America and then in the United States in 2022. It is inspired by the white scarves worn by the Mothers of the Plaza de Mayo.

== Origins ==
The green scarf, as a symbol, was born in 2003 during the XVIII National Meeting of Women in Rosario, Argentina. For the first time, the right to abortion was one of the main demands and green scarves were used during the closing march.

Two years later, in 2005, the National Campaign for the Right to Legal, Safe and Free Abortion was born, and the green scarf was adopted to represent the movement. It was used for years by the activists who marched, in spite of the indifference of the population and the media.

The green scarf is also a reference to the white scarves worn by the Mothers of the Plaza de Mayo. The color green was chosen because it represents hope and because it was not associated with any social or political movement in Argentina. According to one of the participants of the XVIII National Meeting of Women, there was also a pragmatic reason: they wanted to distribute scarves but they did not find enough purple fabric, the color of feminism, however there was enough green available.

The green tone used is located between 347 C and 3415 C by Pantone. Until 2018, in textile stores in Buenos Aires, it was known as "green Benetton". Then it changed to be known as "legal abortion green".

The green scarf bears the legend "Sex education to decide, contraceptives to avoid abortion, legal abortion to avoid death".

== Popularization ==
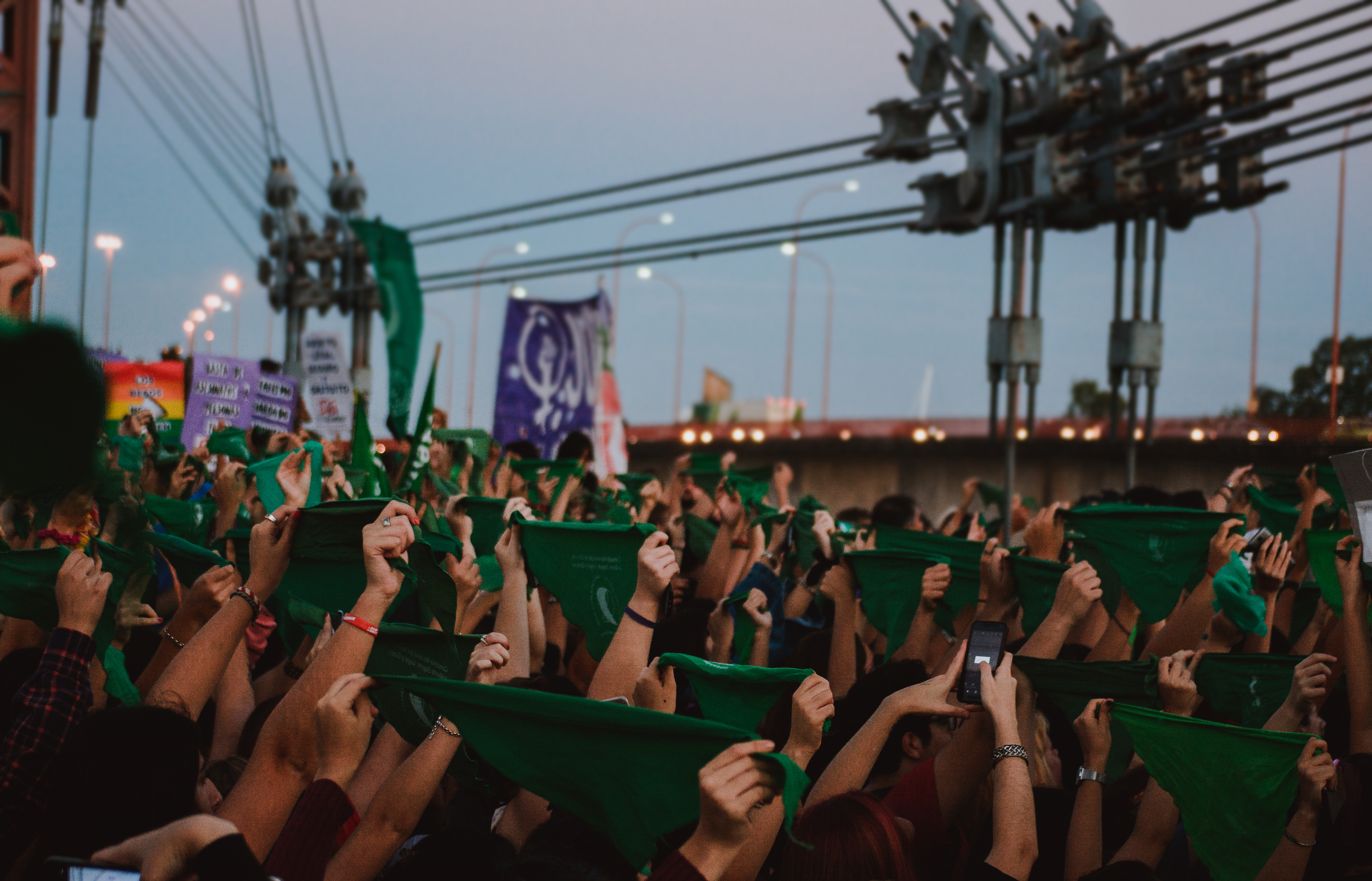
Pañuelazo for the right to legal, safe and free abortion in Santa Fe, 2018

The scarf gradually became more popular, being used in particular during the Ni una menos marches and achieving notoriety in the public space since 2017, after the #MeToo movement, with the march "A global cry for legal abortion" that took place on 28 September of that year, having wide coverage by the media, who spoke of a "green tide".

The green scarf is worn around the neck, on the wrist, or on backpacks and handbags. Celebrities wear it and recently the Mothers of the Plaza de Mayo have incorporated it and usually carry it during their weekly marches.

Until 2018, the National Campaign for the Right to Legal Abortion distributed approximately 8,000 scarves per year, but in 2018 more than 200,000 were distributed.

In reaction, the Argentine anti-abortion movement created a light blue scarf, "in favor of the two lives".

== Internationalization ==
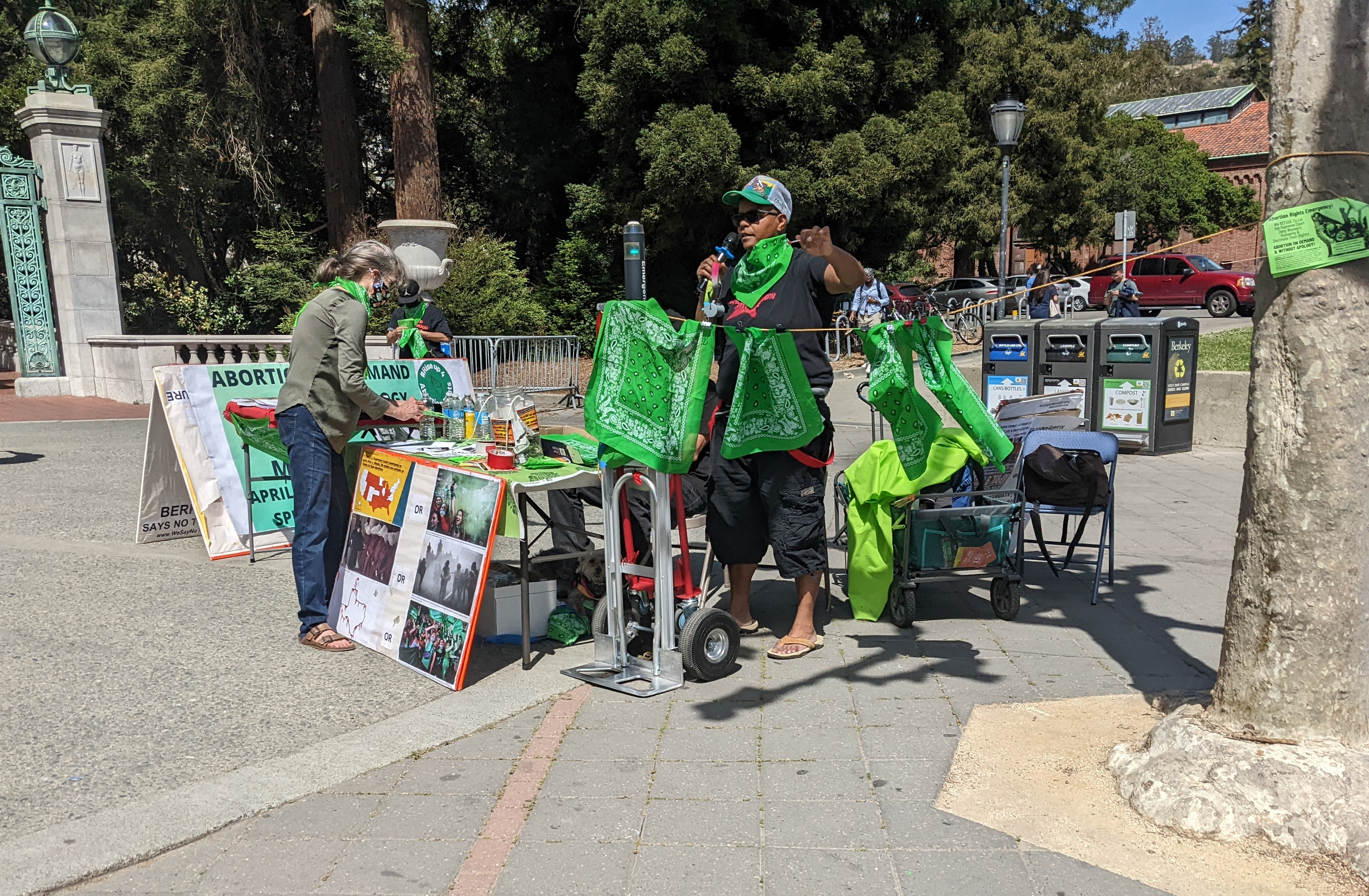
Rise Up 4 Abortion Rights distributing the green scarf outside Sproul Plaza in Berkeley, California

The symbol crossed borders in 2018 and was used in other Latin American countries that fought for the right to abortion. In Chile, for example, the green scarf was used as of 2018, with the messages "Open-access to free and safe abortion" and "#NoBastan3Causales" ("three causes are not enough", referring to the fact that abortion in Chile is only legal in cases of life-threatening risk to the mother, non-viable fetus or rape).

Since September 2020, the green scarf has also been the icon of the Causa Justa Movement in Colombia. This movement filed a lawsuit before the Constitutional Court of that country to eliminate abortion from the penal code. The lawsuit was decided in February 2022 and succeeded in eliminating the crime of abortion up to 24 weeks of gestation.

In May 2022, the green scarf was also used in the United States during the marches in defense of the right to abortion, threatened by a possible overturn of the Roe v. Wade decision.

In June 2022, after the supreme court overturned Roe v. Wade with the Dobbs v. Jackson Women's Health Organization ruling, protests broke out in many cities in the United States, with some protestors using green scarves with the inscriptions "RiseUp4AbortionRights" and "Green4Abortion".

== Prohibitions ==
Although there is no law that bans the use of the green scarf in Argentina, many private institutions (and even some state-run schools) have decided to ban its use and display. Human rights organizations have stood against these prohibitions, stating that they are unconstitutional and a violation of the right to self-expression.
