= Progressive Student Network =

The Progressive Student Network (PSN) was a national, multi-issue, progressive college student activist organization in the United States. It was founded at a conference in 1980 as a merger of the Revolutionary Student Brigade, the Midwest Coalition against Registration and the Draft (Mid-CARD), and the Student Coalition Against Nukes Nationwide (SCANN). The founding of the PSN commemorated the 10 year anniversary of the National Guard killing student anti-war protesters at Kent State and Jackson State in 1970. The PSN quickly grew and attracted many new progressive student activist groups motivated to protest against the shift to the right in U.S. politics when Ronald Reagan was elected president in 1980.

Through the 1980s and into the early 1990s the PSN worked on many issues including organizing against U.S. military intervention in the Central American countries of Nicaragua and El Salvador (the PSN supported the Sandinistas and the FMLN); organizing to kick the CIA off university campuses; the movement against apartheid in South Africa; organizing against the ROTC presence on college campuses; defending women's reproductive rights; and others. PSN groups also led numerous struggles against instances of racism, sexism and homophobia that came up on their campuses. PSN organized a large conference in 1990 at Kent State to commemorate the 20th anniversary of the 1970 Kent State and Jackson State student killings.

== PSN News ==
The PSN published a newspaper called PSN News, which came out sporadically, but usually at least a couple times per semester. In the early years PSN News was published by the UMass Amherst Radical Student Union and the George Washington University Progressive Student Union. Then for most of the 1980s it was published by the University of Iowa PSN chapter, New Wave. In the 1990s it was published by the University of Wisconsin - Madison Progressive Student Network chapter.
