= Refuse Fascism =

American anti-fascist organization

- Formation: December 2016; 9 years ago
- Type: Coalition
- Headquarters: New York City
- Location: United States
- Methods: Nonviolent resistance, Civil disobedience, political protest
- Key people: Sunsara Taylor, Carl Dix, Andy Zee, Cornel West, Paul Street.
- Main organ: Advisory board
- Parent organization: RCP (informal)
- Website: refusefascism.org

Refuse Fascism is a U.S.-based anti-fascist coalition organization, composed of leftists, liberals, intellectuals, artists, and activists, including members of the Revolutionary Communist Party. Until the 2020 United States presidential election, it was characterized by its call for the removal of the first Trump administration by non-violent street protests. After the 2020 election, it counter-demonstrated at a series of pro-Trump events. During Trump’s second term, Refuse Fascism has returned to its call for the removal of Trump by peaceful means. The organization has conducted protests against Trump’s immigration policies, executive order on birthright citizenship, bombing of Iran, opposition to gender affirming care and use of military for domestic purposes. In its “Statement of Unity and Principles,” Refuse Fascism encouraged solidarity with all organizations and individuals wanting to peacefully stop Trump and his policies.

== Organization ==
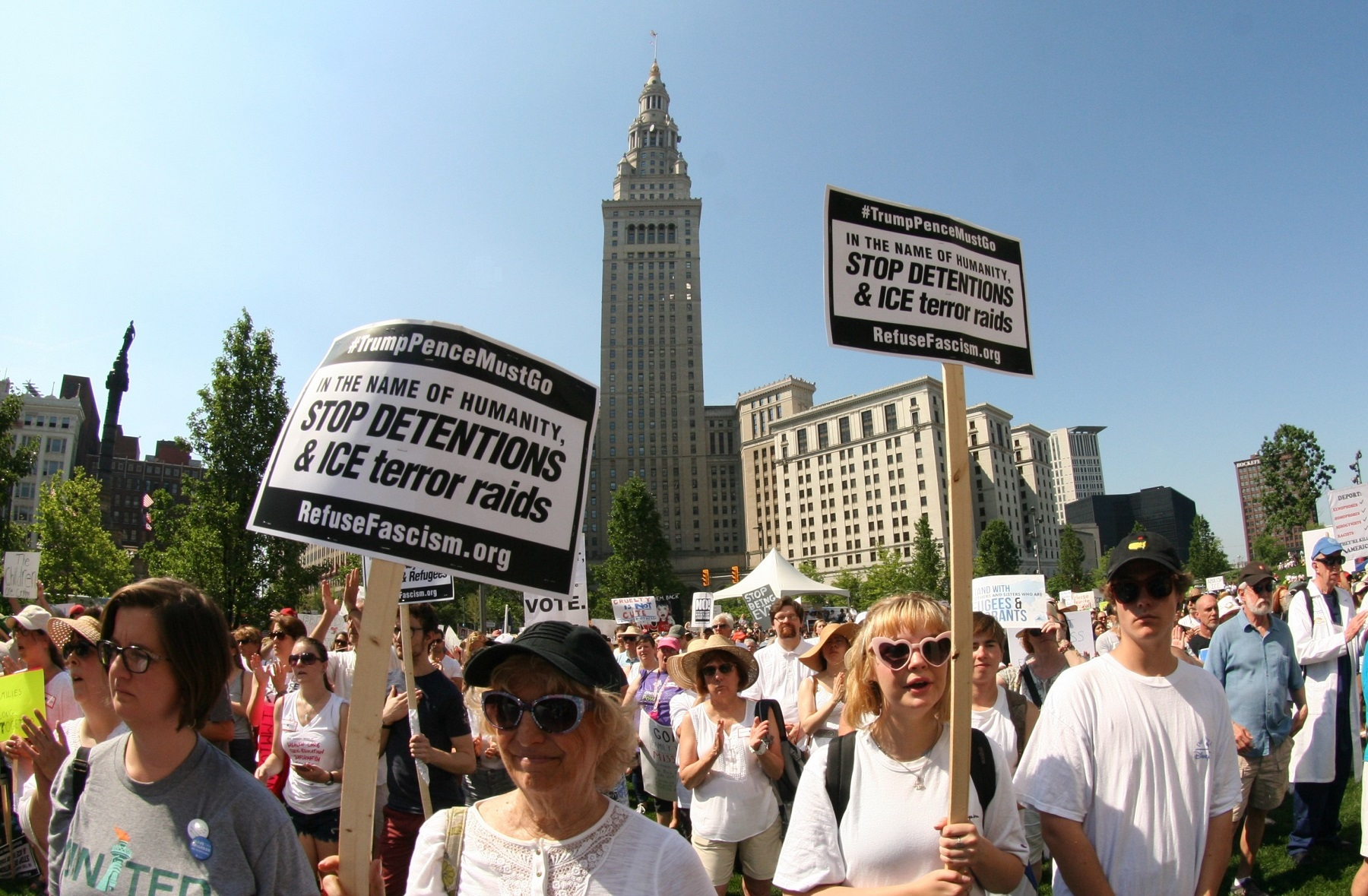
Refuse Fascism placards seen at a rally to protest family separation in Cleveland, Ohio (June, 2018)

Refuse Fascism was formed by a broad ad-hoc coalition of leftists, liberals, intellectuals, artists, and activists, including members of the Revolutionary Communist Party (RCP), after the 2016 election. The RCP has said they issued the call to action which launched the group. Responding to the call, an emergency meeting which officially launched the group was convened at the Great Hall at Cooper Union in New York City, featuring speeches from Sunsara Taylor, Immortal Technique, PZ Myers, Carl Dix, and Jeremy Scahill, among others. Statements of support were sent from Gloria Steinem and Chase Iron Eyes.

Refuse Fascism has been described as having "ties" with or "linked to" the RCP. Spokespeople for Refuse Fascism include Sunsara Taylor and Carl Dix. The group partially operates out of the RCP's Revolution bookshop on 132nd Street in Harlem and shares a mailing address on West Broadway with The World Can't Wait.

== Views ==
Refuse Fascism organizes around issues affecting groups including Muslims, women, LGBTQ people, black and Latino people, children, and the elderly. In August 2017, Refuse Fascism organizers identified themselves as anti-fascists but differentiated themselves from "Antifa". They also distinguished themselves from other groups opposed to Donald Trump such as the Indivisible movement, which engage in electoral politics.

In January 2017, prior to Trump's inauguration, Refuse Fascism member Ted Sirota argued that Trump exhibited fascist "character traits", and argued that the most dangerous aspect of Trump's current presidency would be the alliance "between his unbridled capitalism and the Christian fascism of [Vice President] Mike Pence".

The group advocates Trump's removal from office by constitutional methods (including the Twenty-fifth Amendment) and identifies the Arab Spring and the protests leading to the impeachment of former President of South Korea Park Geun-hye in March 2017 as evidence of the effectiveness of protests. Members share a disbelief in the ability of the Democratic Party's capacity to stop Trump and a commitment to direct action. Refuse Fascism member Rafael Kadaris said in July 2017: "There's a lot of people hoping that Democrats somehow intervene or one of these investigations. The idea we that we can rely on people in the FBI or Democratic party is a dangerous illusion."

Refuse Fascism spokesperson Sunsara Taylor said that the group opposed Trump and Pence because

Trump has openly promoted white supremacy, encouraged police brutality and brought back mandatory sentencing. He has demonized and unleashed terror against immigrants and torn thousands from their families. His Muslim ban is largely in effect. Trump has threatened the courts and the press. The Trump/Pence regime has muzzled scientists, accelerated the destruction of the environment and threatened the world with nuclear annihilation. Pence opposes abortion in all circumstances and would completely deny the rights of LGBTQ people.

== Activities ==
=== January–October 2017 ===
Refuse Fascism organizes non-violent protests. In January 2017 Refuse Fascism participated in the DisruptJ20 protests on the day of Trump's inauguration and the airport protests against Executive Order 13769, which suspended entry to the U.S. by nationals of seven countries.

In July 2017, Refuse Fascism members were present at the Impeachment March events, which called for the U.S. Congress to begin the process of impeaching Trump. Also in July, Refuse Fascism organized demonstrations in several cities, including Los Angeles and San Francisco. Kadaris expressed hope that these demonstrations would "create a legitimacy crisis" affecting Trump's presidency.

In August 2017, following the Unite the Right rally in Charlottesville, Virginia, the Los Angeles branch of Refuse Fascism organized a march which began at Los Angeles City Hall. Refuse Fascism member Michelle Xai said the purpose of the demonstration was "to say, 'No, we're not going to normalize these Nazis and how they feel emboldened.'" Refuse Fascism groups also helped to organize a march to the Trump International Hotel and Tower in Chicago on the same day, and organized a march to Trump Tower in New York City. Carl Dix, a member of Refuse Fascism, said the events in Charlottesville were a "direct outgrowth of the Trump/Pence fascist regime" and said "These fascists are serious. And we must wake up and confront them with resistance that is just as serious."

Refuse Fascism was involved in organizing several demonstrations in Berkeley, California in September 2017: a protest against a speech by the conservative political commentator Ben Shapiro at the University of California, Berkeley on September 12; a "March Against White Supremacy", which was addressed by Chelsea Manning, on September 23; and a demonstration against a planned "Free Speech Week" which involved a brief occupation of Wheeler Hall, on September 25. Also in September, Refuse Fascism–Houston was one of several groups involved in organizing a protest in support of the Deferred Action for Childhood Arrivals program and in opposition to Trump's rescission of the program.

In October 2017 Refuse Fascism members protested panelists at an event on civil discourse and hate speech at the University of California, Los Angeles. One member criticized panelists for normalizing Trump's presidency by discussing hate speech in the abstract.

=== November 4, 2017 ===
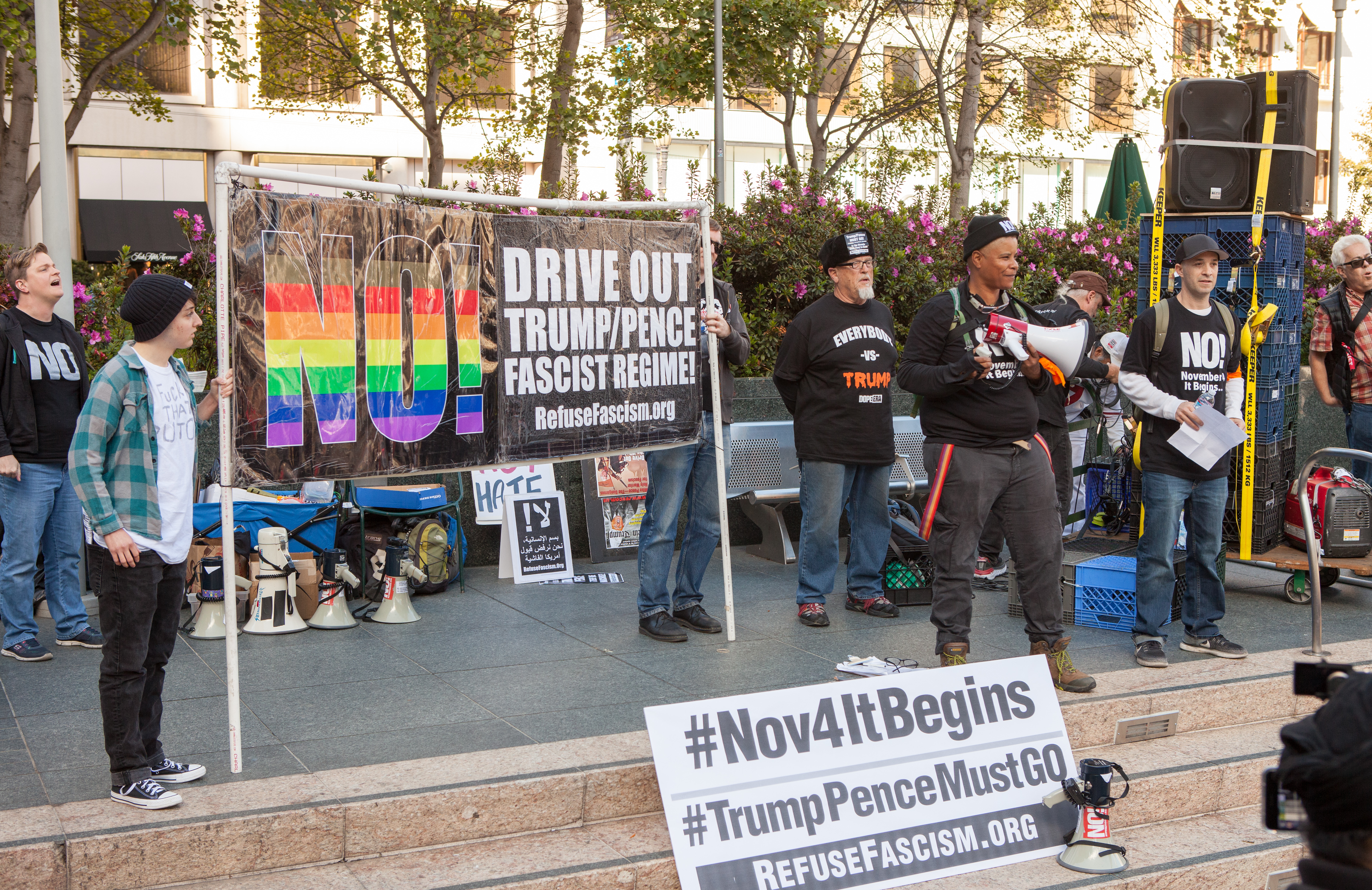
Protesters speak at a Refuse Fascism rally in Union Square, San Francisco, November 4, 2017.

News media reported in September 2017 that Refuse Fascism was organizing a series of nonviolent protests against the Trump administration, which began on November 4, 2017. Conferences were held in Austin, Chicago, Los Angeles, New York and San Francisco in August 2017 in preparation for the protests.

Protestors carrying signs reading "NOV 4 IT BEGINS" blocked traffic on U.S. Route 101, near Alameda Street in Los Angeles, on September 26, 2017.

The road blockade and the planned protests became the subject of a conspiracy theory alleging that anti-fascist groups were planning to foment a civil war in the United States. In September and October 2017 the claims were reported in multiple articles and broadcasts by InfoWars, by the John Birch Society's publication The New American, and by Richard Spencer's Altright.com website. In October 2017, the conspiracy theorist Frank Gaffney and author and activist Trevor Loudon accused Refuse Fascism of inciting, or conspiring to incite, riots across state lines, and called for the federal government to intervene. Later in October, the far-right blog The Gateway Pundit published an article by Lucian Wintrich claiming an "antifa leader" had pledged to "behead white parents" on November 4. The article was shared on Facebook more than 40,000 times. Wintrich subsequently distanced himself from the article. Also in October 2017, rumors circulated claiming that the U.S. Department of Defense (DOD) had scheduled a power outage for November 4. Although the DOD intended to conduct a training exercise that day alongside the American Radio Relay League, an event that had been held quarterly since 2013, the electrical grid was never planned to be turned off. As of October 25, 2017, YouTube videos warning of plans for a civil war had been viewed millions of times; and as of November 2 a viral video entitled "Officer Warns: Antifa To Declare Civil War On Whites Before Year End" had been shared over 55,000 times on Facebook. The conspiracy theory has led to threats to attack the demonstrations and to murder anti-fascists.

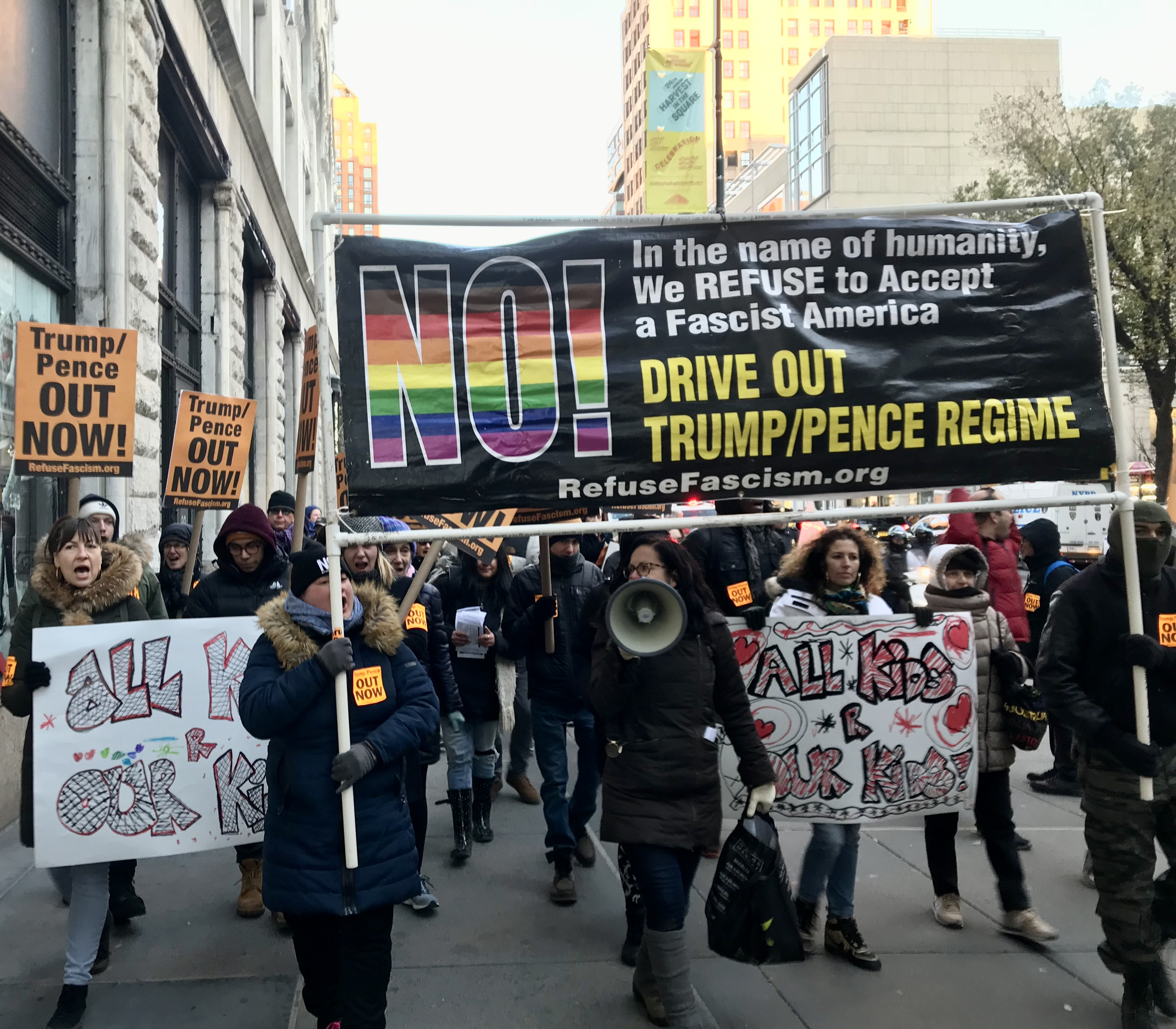
Refuse Fascism members and supporters march in New York City. November 2019.

Taylor said of the claims: "What they're saying is completely false. They're blatant lies, and they're creating and intending to intimidate people who want to stand up to the Trump/Pence regime. It's concerning that these lies are being spread and that they're unleashing threats." Taylor also said that the response "lets us know we've struck a chord, and they recognize the strength of what we are doing." Spencer Sunshine of Political Research Associates argued in October 2017 that "the conspiracy is being used to encourage Far Right activists to harm non-violent Leftist protestors" and that "The organizing function of these 'looming war' narratives serves to motivate the Far Right base, rather than function as actual predictions." Adi Robertson of The Verge wrote on November 3 that "It doesn't necessarily matter how much anyone believes tomorrow's nationwide protest is a civil war—the point is that some people are hoping it will become one."

On November 4, 2017, Refuse Fascism held non-violent demonstrations in New York, Philadelphia, San Francisco, and other cities, in which over 4,000 people attended nationwide.

=== 2020 ===
In March 2020, in response to the COVID-19 pandemic, Refuse Fascism issued an expanded set of demands, including that the government "[p]rovide aid and protection for humanity globally, not just for Americans, based on international cooperation, not competition," the immediate release of all nonviolent offenders from prison and ICE detention centers, the provision of personal protective equipment for all healthcare workers, mass testing, and the provision of ventilators and hospital beds for ICUs, in addition to the overriding demand of the "immediate" removal of Trump and Pence from office.

In late September 2020, Refuse Fascism organized nationwide marches "Against Death, Lies and Fascism" as America neared 200,000 COVID-19 deaths.

=== 2025 ===
After the election of Donald Trump, Refuse Fascism have focused on protesting the current Republican led federal government. With several rallies focused on shutting down traffic and disrupting normal activity near the White House. Refuse Fascism has also participated in No Kings Day protests.

== See also ==
- Protests against Donald Trump
- Antifascism
