= Bob Avakian =

American communist leader (born 1943)

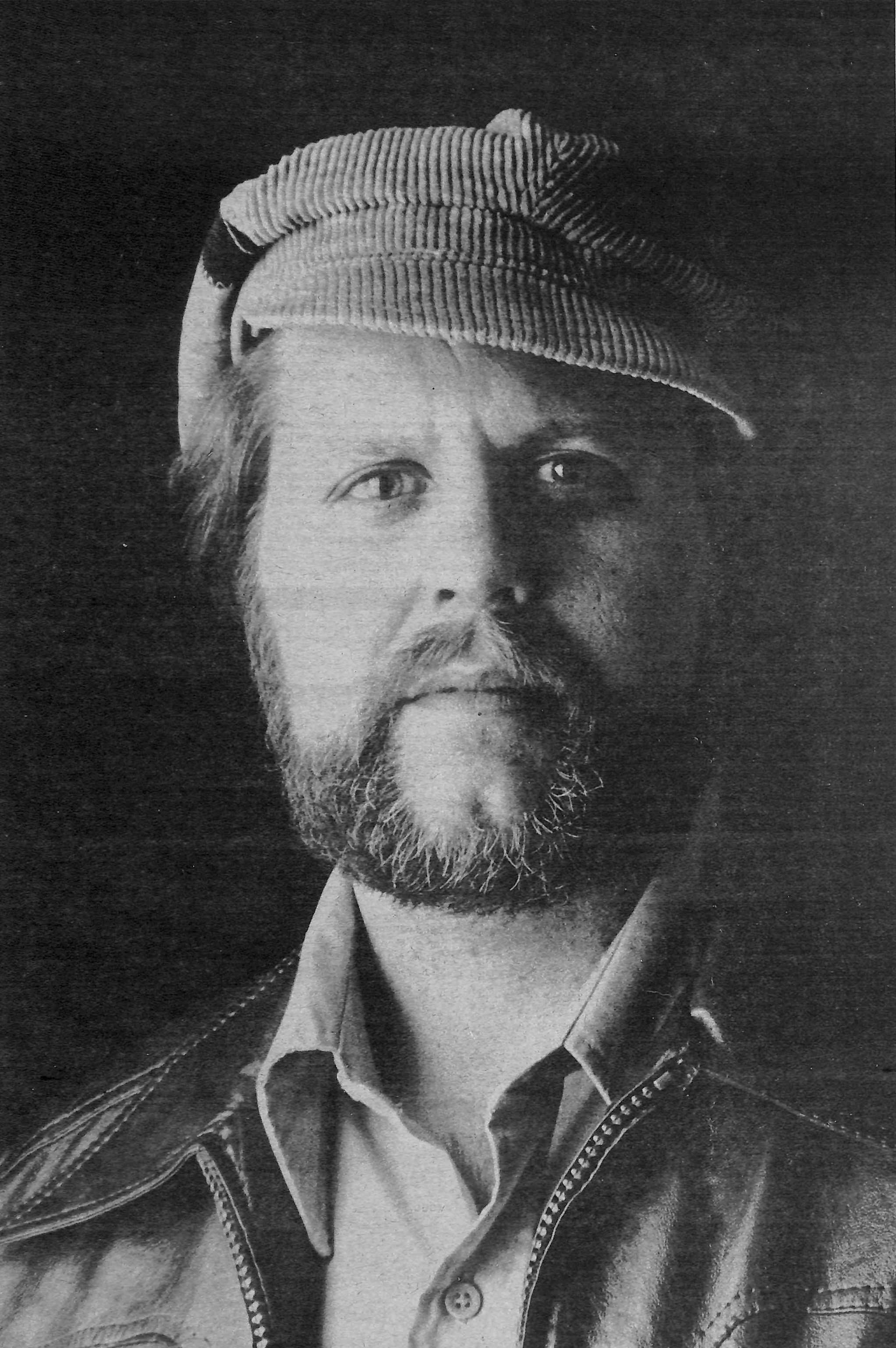
- Avakian in 1980

Chairman of the Revolutionary Communist Party, USA
- Incumbent
- Assumed office 1975
- Preceded by: Position established

Personal details
- Born: Robert Bruce Avakian; March 7, 1943 (age 83) Washington D.C., U.S.
- Party: Revolutionary Communist Party, USA (1975–present)
- Other political affiliations: Peace and Freedom Party (1960s)

Robert Bruce Avakian (born March 7, 1943) is an American far-left political activist and Marxist writer who is the founder and chairman of the Revolutionary Communist Party, USA (RCP).

== Early life ==
Avakian was born on March 7, 1943, in Washington, D.C., to Ruth and Spurgeon "Sparky" Avakian. His father was an Armenian American lawyer, civil rights activist, and later as an Alameda County Superior Court judge. After spending his first three years in the Washington metropolitan area, he spent the rest of his childhood and adolescence in Berkeley, California.

== Political activities ==
As a student at UC Berkeley, Avakian became involved with Students for a Democratic Society (SDS), the Free Speech Movement and the Black Panther Party. In 1968, he wrote articles for the Peace and Freedom Party's publications and in July 1969, he spoke at the Black Panther Party conference in Oakland, California. Avakian was a member of the SDS Revolutionary Youth Movement II faction, and ran as the RYM II candidate for National Secretary at the 1969 SDS National Convention. Avakian was defeated by Mark Rudd of the faction later known as the Weather Underground. During that period, Avakian was a founding member of the Bay Area Revolutionary Union alongside Leibel Bergman.

In the early 1970s, Avakian served a prison sentence for desecrating the American flag during a demonstration. He was charged with assaulting a police officer in January 1979 at a demonstration in Washington, D.C. to protest Deng Xiaoping's meeting with Jimmy Carter. Facing numerous felony charges, Avakian went to France, where he applied for political refugee status. His claim was eventually denied but in 1982, U.S. prosecutors agreed to drop the charges against him and other protesters as part of a plea bargain.

Avakian has been the RCP's central committee chairman and national leader since 1979. As chairman, he has produced a large body of work that articulates what the RCP identifies as "the new synthesis of communism" or "new communism". In 2016, the RCP USA and others helped form the organization Refuse Fascism, which called for Donald Trump's removal from office.

== Criticism ==
Avakian has been criticized as the center of an alleged cult of personality within the RCP. Author Aaron J. Leonard, who worked with the RCP, identified Avakian's 1979 trial as a catalyst in the development of this supposed cult of personality. In 2016, former USLAW national coordinator Michael Eisenscher called the RCP "a cult around Avakian" in an interview with Harper's Magazine. In June 2022, a coalition of 23 abortion rights, feminist, and mutual-aid groups released a statement denouncing RCP and the affiliated abortion rights organization Rise Up 4 Abortion Rights, and calling the RCP a "cult."

Avakian has noted that the RCP emphasizes "the great importance of the work I have done, and continue to do", but claims that criticism of his position within the RCP is "unscientific". The party has called any claims of cultism within its ranks "lies and slander".
