= Rise Up 4 Abortion Rights =

USA based abortion rights organization

- Abbreviation: RU4AR
- Formation: January 2022
- Type: Coalition
- Purpose: Abortion Rights Activism
- Headquarters: New York, New York
- Methods: Political demonstration, Civil disobedience, Nonviolent resistance
- Key people: Sunsara Taylor, Merle Hoffman, Eve Ensler
- Website: https://riseup4abortionrights.org/

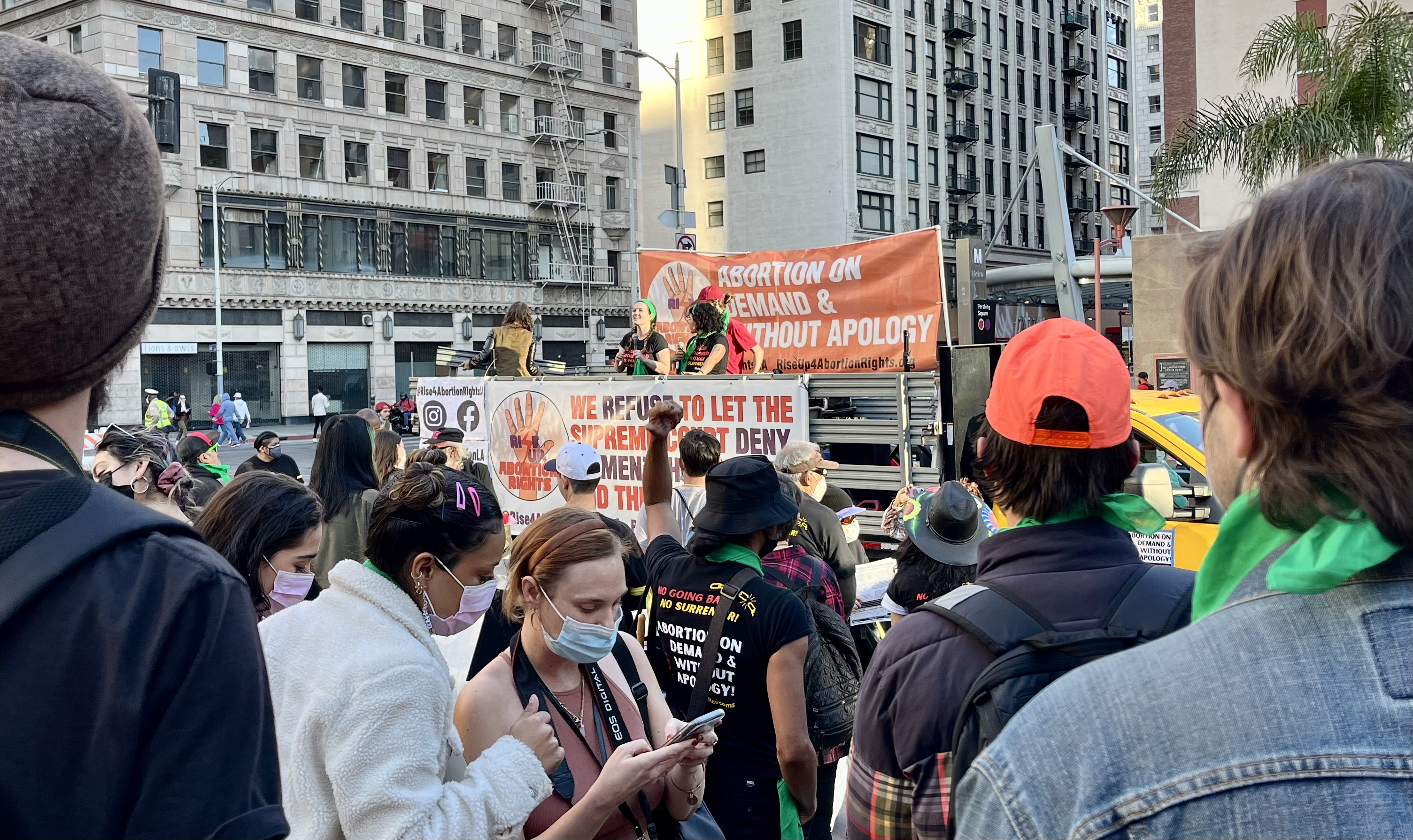
Rise Up 4 Abortion Rights rally in Los Angeles, CA, March 8, 2022

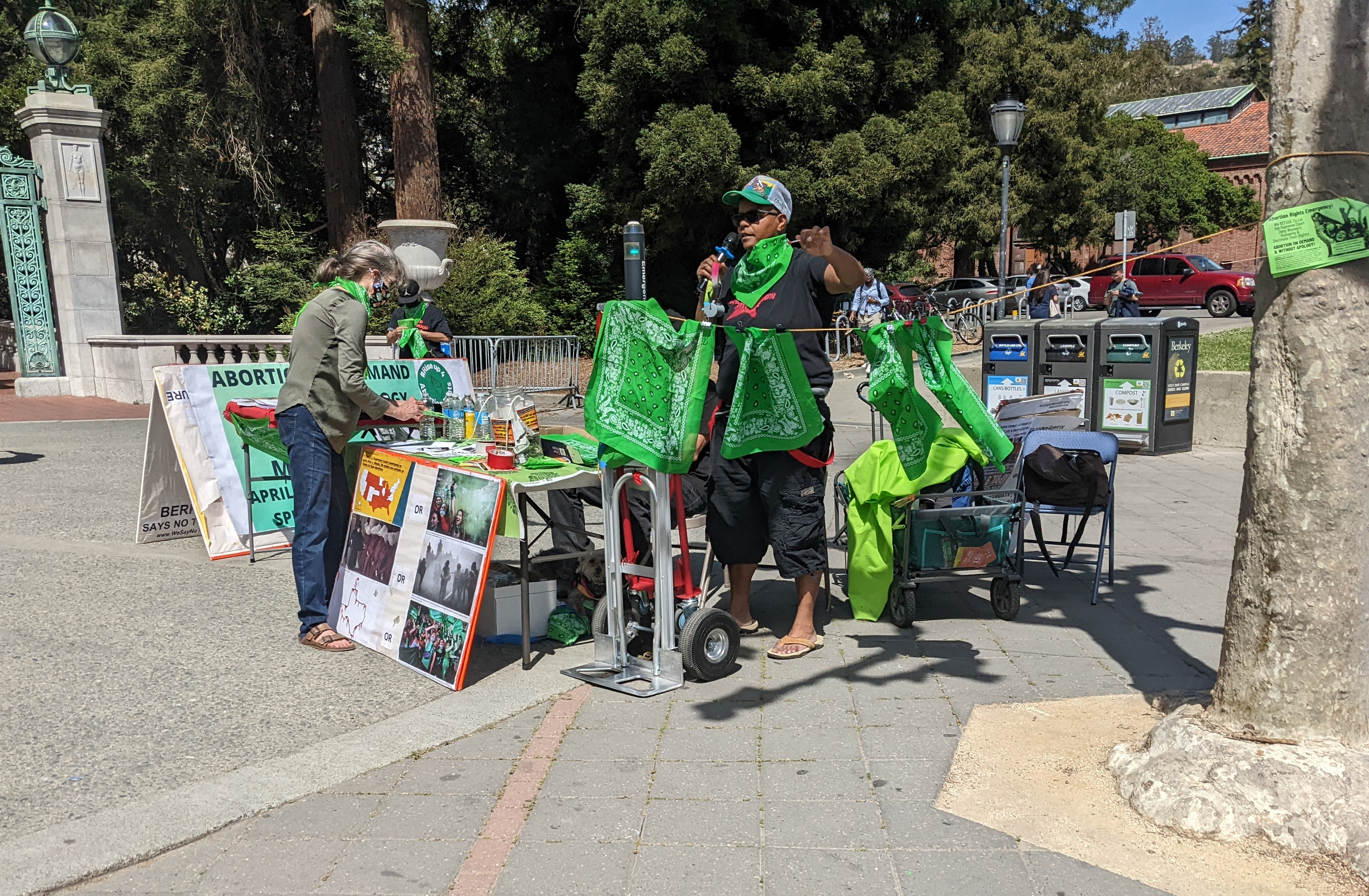
Kareim McKnight of Rise Up 4 Abortion rights distributing green scarf outside Sproul Plaza in Berkeley, CA.

Rise Up 4 Abortion Rights is a U.S.-based pro-choice coalition founded by Merle Hoffman, Lori Sokol, Sunsara Taylor, among others. It is a front organization for the Revolutionary Communist Party, USA. Formed in January 2022, it was aimed at preventing the U.S. Supreme Court from overturning Roe V. Wade and "decimating" abortion rights in the United States.

The group is among those in the United States who use the green scarf as a reproductive rights symbol, borrowing from its use in Argentina since 2003.

== Marches and actions ==
Since its founding RU4AR activists have organized protests across the country in major cities including New York City, Seattle, Los Angeles, Houston, Riverside, California, San Francisco, Santa Monica, Louisville, and Washington, D.C. They also demonstrated outside Justice Amy Coney Barrett's home in Falls Church, Virginia.

On May 12, 2022, RU4AR organized a protest in which approximately 2,000 high-school students walked out of school to demand that the Supreme Court not overturn the right to abortion. The walkout took place more than a week after the Dobbs v. Jackson Women's Health Organization draft opinion was leaked, sparking many protests and outrage.

U.S. Representative Alexandria Ocasio-Cortez marched with the group.

== Reception ==
Other abortion rights groups and other activist groups have criticized Rise Up 4 Abortion Rights' protest strategies, its connections to the Revolutionary Communist Party, USA, and the fact that it is a for-profit organization. Articles in The Daily Beast, The Intercept, and VICE detailed these groups’ criticism.

Co-founder Sunsara Taylor is a member of Revolutionary Communist Party, USA which played a role in founding and building Rise Up 4 Abortion Rights. While she is an active party member, working as a Revolution Nothing Less talk show host and writer for RCP's Revolution magazine, the other co-founders of the coalition, Sokol and Hoffman, and the majority of RU4AR supporters are not affiliated.

RU4AR's founders spoke against the allegations that the group is part of a cult of personality for Bob Avakian and a pyramid scheme in CounterPunch, and Taylor also opposed the charges in Revolution magazine online. A further article in CounterPunch described the allegations as red-baiting.
