= Merle Hoffman =

American journalist and activist

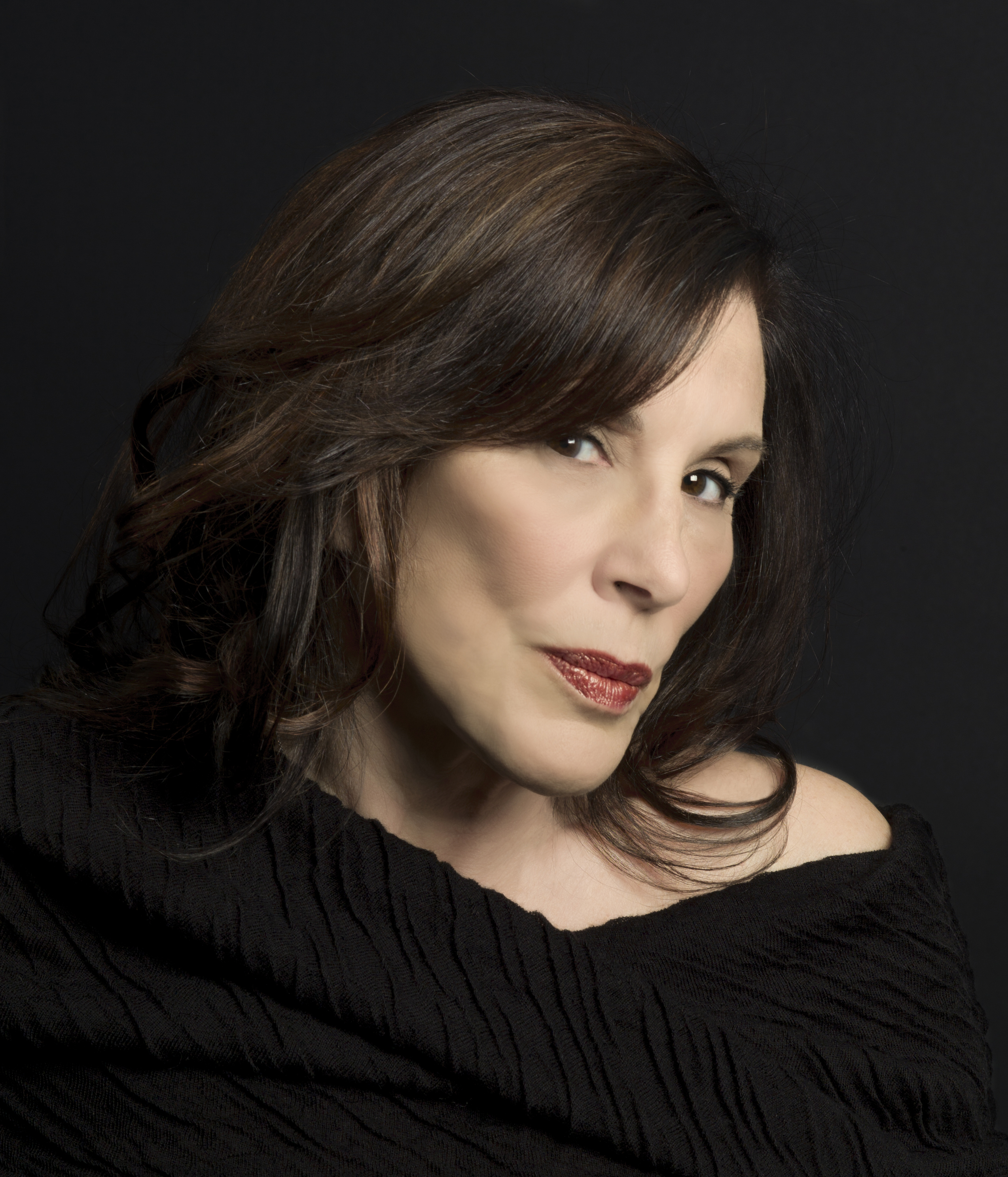
- Hoffman, photo by Joan Roth.
- Born: March 6, 1946 (age 80)
- Known for: Publishing On the Issues magazine

Merle Hoffman (born March 6, 1946) is an American journalist and activist.

Shortly after New York State legalized abortion in 1970, three years before the Supreme Court's Roe v. Wade decision legalized abortion nationally, Hoffman helped establish one of the country's first ambulatory abortion centers, Flushing Women's Medical Center in 1971. It was the forerunner of Choices Women's Medical Center which Hoffman founded and serves as president and CEO. Choices is a full-service healthcare provider, offering gynecological services, pre-natal care, family care, transgender health care, telemedicine, mental health and other services.

Hoffman co-founded the National Abortion Federation in 1976, the first professional organization of abortion providers in the U.S., and was its first president. She also founded the New York Pro-Choice Coalition in 1985. Hoffman is the publisher of On the Issues magazine, which began as a print publication in 1983 and then became an online publication in 2008. She was awarded the Front Page Award for Political Commentary in 2010 from the Newswoman's Club of New York.

== Early life ==
Hoffman was born in Philadelphia and raised in New York City in a Jewish family. Initially intent on becoming a concert pianist, she attended the High School of Music and Art in New York City and graduated from Chatham Square Music School. After living and studying music in Paris, Hoffman returned to the United States and graduated from Queens College, Phi Beta Kappa and magna cum laude in 1972. She attended the Social Psychology Doctoral Program at the City University of New York Graduate Center from 1972 to 1975.

== Early influences ==
In her 2012 memoir, Intimate Wars: The Life and Times of the Woman Who Brought Abortion from the Back Alley to the Boardroom, Hoffman recounts how she was exposed to feminist activism at Queens College in the late '60s and early '70s. She attended a reading by the writer Anaïs Nin and later a lecture by Florynce Kennedy, "who spoke about lesbianism and abortion, giving the class one of her famous lines: 'If men could get pregnant, abortion would be a sacrament.'" In her memoir, Hoffman recalls that her first exposure to abortion had been when she was about ten: "I overheard my parents' discussion of a Philadelphia physician whose patient had died while he was performing an illegal procedure. To cover for himself, he cut her up in pieces and put her remains down the drain."

== Career ==
=== Healthcare "firsts" and innovations ===
Hoffman co-founded and helped run Flushing Women's Medical Center (forerunner of Choices Women's Medical Center) in the borough of Queens in NYC in the spring of 1971, two years before Roe v. Wade legalized abortion nationwide. Hoffman considered many standard medical practices of the day sexist, invasive, and paternalistic. In response, she developed many of the patient-centered tenets and practices that have since become standards of female and feminist healthcare and implemented them at Flushing Women's. Hoffman's theory of "Patient Power" led to such now-standard practices as having another staff member in the room with the doctor and patient at all times and developing the concept of informed consent; having other women counselors rather than doctors provide emotional support and answer patients' questions during abortions; and using patients' abortion-based clinic visits as an opportunity to provide sexual health education as well as counseling on birth control options. Hoffman was also among the first to urge women to question their doctor about everything from their training and background to the reason for prescribing certain medications. Her work was noted by Francis X. Clines in The New York Times as "making women feel powerful."

In November, 1974, Hoffman was the initiator and moderator for New York City's first Women's Health Forum, with speakers including Barbara Ehrenreich and Congresswoman Bella Abzug. In 1975, Hoffman helped develop and introduce a program to diagnosis women with breast cancer in an outpatient center. The program, known as STOP (Second Treatment Option Program), was pathbreaking; prior to its inception women were not consulted as to their diagnosis or treatment options. Previously, doctors had simply removed the breast of any woman whose biopsy came back positive while she was still anesthetized and before she had the opportunity to learn about her options or make decisions.

When Hoffman learned about the lack of birth control options available to women in Russia, she organized and led a trip of physicians and counselors from Choices on a well-publicized educational exchange there. In 1974 she began working with Russian hospitals and doctors to develop CHOICES East, the first feminist outpatient medical center in Russia, and organized Russian feminists to deliver an open letter to Boris Yeltsin on the state of women's health care.

=== Writing, publishing and media ===
In 1982, Hoffman produced, directed, and wrote the documentary film Abortion: A Different Light, and in 1986 she produced and hosted the first feminist TV show, MH: On the Issues, a syndicated 30-minute cable TV show. Her first guest was then-Congresswoman Bella Abzug. Others included Betty Friedan and Phyllis Chesler. A documentary film, 25 Years of Choices: Feminism from the Ground Up (1986), was produced to honor her and her work.

Hoffman's writing has appeared in numerous publications and journals including the American Journal of Obstetrics and Gynecology and the Journal of the American Medical Women's Association. Hoffman also published two studies with Adelphi University in the 80s that documented how poverty leads many women to choose abortions and showed that nearly half the women seeking abortion at CHOICES would pursue one illegally if Roe v. Wade were repealed. The study, "Abortionomics: When Choice is a Necessity – The Impact of Recession on Abortion," was updated in 2011, and the results were presented at the National Press Club in Washington, D.C., on January 19, 2012.

Hoffman began a newsletter for Choices in 1982 which developed into On the Issues: The Progressive Women's Quarterly, an acclaimed national magazine with an international following, featuring interviews by Hoffman with notable activists and thinkers, including Andrea Dworkin, Congressman John Lewis, Kate Millett, and Elie Wiesel. In 2008, On the Issues became an online magazine, extending its reach even further. For both print and online editions, Hoffman wrote editorials on subjects ranging from her visit to San Francisco General Hospital's AIDS Unit in 1985 to a visit to a Rape Crisis Center in South Africa, and what is feels like to be an abortion provider in a time of attacks on clinics and murders of doctors.

In 1990, she published an editorial in the Amsterdam News in response to the Central Park jogger rape case.

Hoffman's memoir, Intimate Wars: The Life and Times of the Woman Who Brought Abortion from the Back Alley to the Boardroom, was published in 2012 by Feminist Press. Publishers Weekly opined that "she eloquently chronicles more than three decades of struggles to keep abortion legal. Readers will learn much about her drive to recast 'reproductive freedom as a positive moral value.'" Kirkus Reviews called it "An inspiring story of a woman who participated in 'one of the greatest revolutions in history'—and is still at the forefront of the struggle."

=== Political activism ===
Hoffman was one of the first activists to criticize Operation Rescue, an organization dedicated to ending access to abortion by blockading clinics. When Operation Rescue announced it would shut down abortion services in New York City for a week in the spring of 1988, the New York Pro-Choice Coalition, founded by Hoffman, responded by rebranding those days "Reproductive Freedom Week," organizing a counter protest that drew 1,300 activists and supporters, and dispatching supporters to ensure that every clinic or doctor's offices Operation Rescue targeted remained open.

During the 1989 New York City Mayoral Race, shortly after the U.S. Supreme Court ruled in Webster that states could limit abortion access, Hoffman and the New York Pro-Choice Coalition held a press conference to rate the candidates on this question.

In 1989 Hoffman also publicly challenged New York City's Cardinal John O'Connor's support of Operation Rescue, which she deemed "violent to women" by organizing the first pro-choice civil disobedience action outside St. Patrick's Cathedral in New York City. Several hundred participated, and nine pro-choice protestors were arrested.

In January 2022 she helped to found Rise Up 4 Abortion Rights, a reproductive rights coalition based in New York City.

=== Recognition and awards ===
Hoffman received the "Bella" Award from the Bella Abzug Leadership Institute, founded by Liz Abzug, daughter of the late Congresswoman, Bella Abzug, in 2015.

The Newswomen's Club of New York awarded Hoffman the Front Page Award for her article "Selecting the Same Sex," published in On The Issues. The essay about the complex issues of sex selection and abortion appeared in the Summer 2009 edition. Hoffman's essay did "a brilliant job with a controversial subject," said syndicated columnist Lenore Skenazy, who presented the Opinion Writing Award to her at a dinner and ceremony in New York on Nov. 4, 2010.

The 1995 Media Award from Community Action NW was given to On the Issues for "Exceptional Merit" for the article, "Let's Get Tough on Rape," A Discussion with Prosecutors Liz Holtzman and Alice Vachss by Hoffman.

Hoffman was honored for her work by New York City Mayor Ed Koch and the Mayor's Volunteer Action Center in appreciation of "dedicated volunteer service" and the Department of Corrections of New York City (July 10, 1984); Friends of Animals/Eco-Visions Conference (1994).

=== Archives and legacy ===
Hoffman's Archive Collection, which features the On the Issues back catalog, CHOICES documents, and thousands of pages on the Reproductive Rights movement is in the Merle Hoffman Papers Collection, 1994 to 2001, at Duke University.

In 2011, Hoffman endowed a director's position for sustained leadership of the Duke University Sallie Bingham Center for Women's History and Culture.

== Personal life ==
In 2005, Hoffman adopted a three-year-old girl from Siberia whom she named Sasha.

Hoffman is Jewish.
