= Marcy Bloom =

American abortion rights activist

Marcy Bloom (born 1954) is an American pro-choice activist known for serving for eighteen years as executive director of Aradia Women's Health Center in Seattle. Bloom was the 2006 recipient of the ACLU's highest honor, the William O. Douglas Award, for her work.

Bloom has described abortion as a "moral good", rather than a necessary evil. She writes a regular column for RH Reality Check, and is a leading fundraiser for reproductive rights organizations in Mexico. In addition to her work for abortion rights, Bloom is regarded as an expert on the biological aspects of sexual intercourse.

During the 2000 Democratic primary campaign, Senator Bill Bradley of New Jersey enlisted Bloom to tape radio ads critical of Al Gore's past flirtation with opposition to abortion.

Bloom is a board member of the Washington, D.C.–based National Abortion Rights Action League.

Bloom is now doing U.S. advocacy and capacity building for a Mexico City-based organization, GIRE – El Grupo de Informacion en Reproduccion Elegida/The Information Group on Reproductive Choice. The GIRE organization helps women in Mexico seek abortion rights. The reason she has migrated to work in the GIRE organization is because women in Mexico face less reproductive rights than women in the US. Bloom has lobbied against abortion restrictions in high court hearings to advocate for women reproduction rights.
