= 1969 Students for a Democratic Society National Convention =

The 1969 Students for a Democratic Society National Convention held in June of that year in Chicago, Illinois was the final convention held by the Students for a Democratic Society (SDS). The gathering, which took place over June 18–22, was one of four conventions that officers and members of SDS attended each year. Taking place at the Chicago Coliseum, the convention was the site of chaos and tension, with members breaking into factions, each vying for control of the organization. Prior to this convention, one of the factions, the Revolutionary Youth Movement (RYM), soon to be renamed the Weathermen, wrote a manifesto regarding the ways and means by which to take SDS in the years to come. The creation of the Weathermen, from RYM, was essentially the main reason for the functioning, and later the disintegration, of SDS. Leading members of the college-based organization wanted to push its boundaries in order to create real revolution and change in America. The SDS National Convention of June 1969 was the culmination of all disagreement within its membership. The result of the convention was a disoriented and gutted organization, complete in only its name.

== Background ==
1969 was a year of turmoil and destruction. The conflict in Vietnam entered its sixth year with no end in sight, as the spring "saw the longest and most violent student strike in American history". Vietnam was an important and all-encompassing topic that covered television, college campuses, newspapers, and conversation. Richard Nixon began his first of two terms as president. The world had seen the chaos of the 1968 Democratic National Convention as it erupted into protest and political radicalism was on the rise.

=== Worker Student Alliance (WSA)/Progressive Labor Party (PL) ===
The SDS June 1969 Convention is best described as a clash between three major factions of the organization: the Revolutionary Youth Movement (RYM), the Worker Student Alliance (WSA) also known as the Progressive Labor Party (PL), and the Revolutionary Youth Movement II (RYM II). The three factions could be described with PL on one end, RYM on the other, and RYM II somewhere in between the two. PL (aka WSA) took a very strictly traditional Maoist-Marxist line. Led by communist Jeff Gordon, PL saw themselves separate of the counterculture, and did not "smoke dope or wear their hair long". This was something that RYM and RYM II disliked about the Maoist faction; the fact that SDS was of and for the counterculture was one of its most distinguishing traits, thus the two other factions felt that PL was disrespecting this feature of the college-based organization. WSA "saw race as divisive and promoted a staid and conservative view of the working class". They did not back African-American nationalism as the RYMs did, and described their purpose as class struggle, appealing to the working class proletariat of America. PL's platform centered around "the old left notion that black nationalism was a diversion from the all-important class struggle". This was a stark contrast from RYM, who saw America's faults in terms of race and imperialism. PL vied for control of SDS in order to expel these other schools of thought and bring in the working-classes of America. However, their conflict with RYM and RYM II at the convention was both poorly timed and not enough to seize full control.

=== Revolutionary Youth Movement (RYM) ===
Going into the June 1969 Convention, RYM was the faction with the most power and control over SDS and originally encompassed those who were a part of RYM II. SDS leaders, Mark Rudd and Bernardine Dohrn being among the leaders of RYM, this faction expected to take SDS into a new decade more radical than ever, under a new name: the Weathermen. This involved expelling the PL, who they viewed as racist and conservative. In the convention's edition of the New Left Notes, the RYM (now calling themselves the Weathermen) published their manifesto: "You Don't Need a Weatherman to Know Which Way the Wind Blows," based on the song Subterranean Homesick Blues by Bob Dylan. It emphasized their purpose of fighting American-imperialism alongside the Black Panthers, Vietnamese, and other third world countries around the globe. The now Weathermen believed that the "fight for black liberation [was] an anti-colonial struggle against racism and the racist imperialist power structure, as well as being part of the class struggle". Landing on the opposite end of the Left's spectrum, RYM felt that their views were superior to PL, and thus planned on being the victors of the convention.

=== Revolutionary Youth Movement II (RYM II) ===
RYM II grew out of RYM as a reactionary group to RYM's "Weatherman" manifesto. Led by Mike Klonsky, RYM II essentially became a real faction at the convention, parting ways from RYM because of ideological differences. Although they backed black nationalism, they interpreted "white skin privileges as being 'insignificant'" and believed in a more traditional Marxist approach, one that related closely to the Soviet Comintern of 1928. They agreed with PL on Old Leftist values, but were not as conservative and did not go as far as to say that race was reactionary to class struggle. RYM II "sought to capture white allegiance by appealing to white 'material interest' – wages, or hours, or benefits". This goal to appeal to the working classes of America on a different level than PL, made the members of RYM II want to pair with their former fellow members in RYM to push PL out of SDS.

== Events ==
=== The First Day ===
The first day of the convention, June 18, 1969, was filled with "delegates clashing over seemingly minor procedural issues". During the opening talks, "PL put forth a resolution that mainstream media be barred completely from the convention". This was passed with overwhelming support, the only proposal of the convention that was agreed upon by all three factions.

=== The Second Day ===
On the second day, both RYM faction leaders "engineered a show of solidarity", inviting as speakers "representatives of the Young Lords, a Puerto Rican nationalist group, and the Black Panthers [to] address the assembly". This angered the PL, as the Panthers "were fully aware of PL's animosity toward black nationalism," and "were unrestrained in their contempt for PL" as well. Rufus "Chaka" Walls, the Black Panther speaker, then took the stand to give a speech, insulting PL by calling them "armchair Marxists" and painting them as racist. However, it was not the PL who came out of the second day as the most flustered, "the anti-PL front was severely embarrassed" when Walls, "after attacking the 'armchair Marxists' in PL... managed to offend most in the room by criticising women's liberation as 'pussy power'". He began a chant this phrase and PL countered by yelling "Smash Male Chauvinism!". The "evening ended in a fist fight" when the myriad shouting would not come to a conclusion. June 19 was also the day of the convention in which RYM II officially emerged as a faction. Seeing the disagreement between PL and RYM, the members of the new RYM II began to quarrel with its mother faction (RYM) and had many "disagreements over the Weatherman paper" concerning Marxist issues, wanting to relate more to the working peoples of America and class struggle.

=== The Third Day ===
The last three days, June 20–22, 1969, are very much connected and are sometimes described as a blur. The third day of the convention, June 20, 1969, began with tense conversations between RYM, RYM II, and PL who fought over how to proceed with SDS as a whole. The question of black nationalism and the role of women in SDS caused much disagreement. RYM thought that black nationalism was important and backed it, while RYM II merely agreed that it existed and PL very strongly opposed to it. Like black nationalism, when it came to the "matter of women's liberation," PL thought that it was more important for women to "focus upon the 'class struggle'". RYM disagreed, instead proposing that women's focus be in "anti-imperialism and anti-racism", but in a more prominent and powerful role. To PL's beliefs, Bernardine Dohrn, Mike Klonsky, and others "responded by declaring that it was impossible to remain in the same organization with people who opposed self-determination in practice and demanded an immediate split". After this, Dohrn "announced that she was walking out and invited all those who agreed with her to follow".

=== The Fourth Day ===
The next day began with RYM I and II meeting in an opposite wing than PL, on different sides of the Coliseum. As discussion eventually resumed between the two groups, "it became clear that the expulsion of PL was inevitable". Dohrn spoke again about Third World Struggles and anti-imperialism, things of which PL had no concern. She ended her speech with the proclamation that SDS "was becoming a revolutionary movement; and as such, it could not allow a group such as PL in its ranks". Chanting began again, with PL fighting for their beliefs; however, it was basically over. "Although they controlled a third of the delegates at the final SDS convention," the reality was that PL "had a presence in only a handful of the locations where SDS was active, and everyone knew it. It was over.".

=== The Fifth Day ===
Statement issued by one SDS faction immediately after the convention. (Side 1)

Statement issued by one SDS faction immediately after the convention. (Side 2)

The final day was short, SDS was now an organization consisting of the factions RYM and a much less powerful RYM II. What was left of the organization's leading members and officers were Weathermen. However, as "excised as it might have been", PL did meet on that last day in the Coliseum. "Proclaiming itself the true SDS," PL met on the other side of the convention center, away from the new SDS, who spent their last day planning a Chicago event that would take place that October, only a few months later. This event is what would later be named the Days of Rage.

== Consequences ==
=== Creation of the Weathermen ===
The final SDS National Convention in June 1969 herald in a new era of the radical left, with the casting out of PL being regarded as a concise cleaning-up of SDS. The convention resulted in SDS practically in shambles, the three factions had only caused the downfall of the organization instead of the progress they wanted to accomplish. The Weathermen were now in control of SDS, taking it into the 1970s with a new focus and drive towards real radical revolution in the United States. They intended on truly 'bringing the war home'. Under the SDS flag, "the Weathermen had claimed... that it was seeking, by its militancy, to win whites to the black and Vietnamese struggles". In the months to follow, the Weathermen would ultimately shed its mother organization's name and enter a decade of rage and uncertainty, eventually being forced to move underground.

=== The Days of Rage ===
The Days of Rage took place shortly after the June Convention, during the second week of October that fall. Taking place once again in Chicago, they were a consequence of the Weatherman faction seizing control of the student-run organization and convincing the group as a whole for the need of a full-fledged revolution. During the Days of Rage, "young radicals invested militant action with special power to enlighten, inspire, and mobilize". This event "provided a way for them to establish the authenticity of their commitments, to assert their dissident or 'revolutionary' identities, and to live what they considered meaningful and engaged lives. The Weathermen had anticipated "at least 25,000 people" were to attend the Days of Rage; however, "instead of the promised 25,000 white youth ready to tear up 'pig city,'" a mere "700 to 800 people gathered" half of them spectators. The four-day spectacle opened the Weathermen's eyes to the fact that because of their tactics, they would not gain the support that they had originally intended on gathering.

=== Disintegration of RYM II ===
Shortly after the June 1969 Convention, the newly made Revolutionary Youth Movement II, with Mike Klonsky at the helm, splintered off and disintegrated. As opposed to the Weathermen, who were "secure in the understandings of imperialism and white supremacy", RYM II "defined the existence of a black nation that neither the Panthers nor SNCC had asked for". This caused frustration and disagreement among the relatively young faction, and resulted in the splintering off of members into new, even smaller factions, all of which seemed focused on their own version of Communist Party formation. "By the spring" of 1970, "except for a pocket here or there, RYM was dead".
