= Revolutionary Communist Party, USA =

Political party

- Chairman: Bob Avakian
- Founded: 1968
- Preceded by: Revolutionary Youth Movement
- Headquarters: Chicago, Illinois
- Membership (2010): 300
- Ideology: Communism; Anti-revisionism; Marxism–Leninism–Maoism; Bob Avakian's New Synthesis
- Political position: Far-left
- International affiliation: none (2006–current); Revolutionary Internationalist Movement (1986–2006)

Party flag
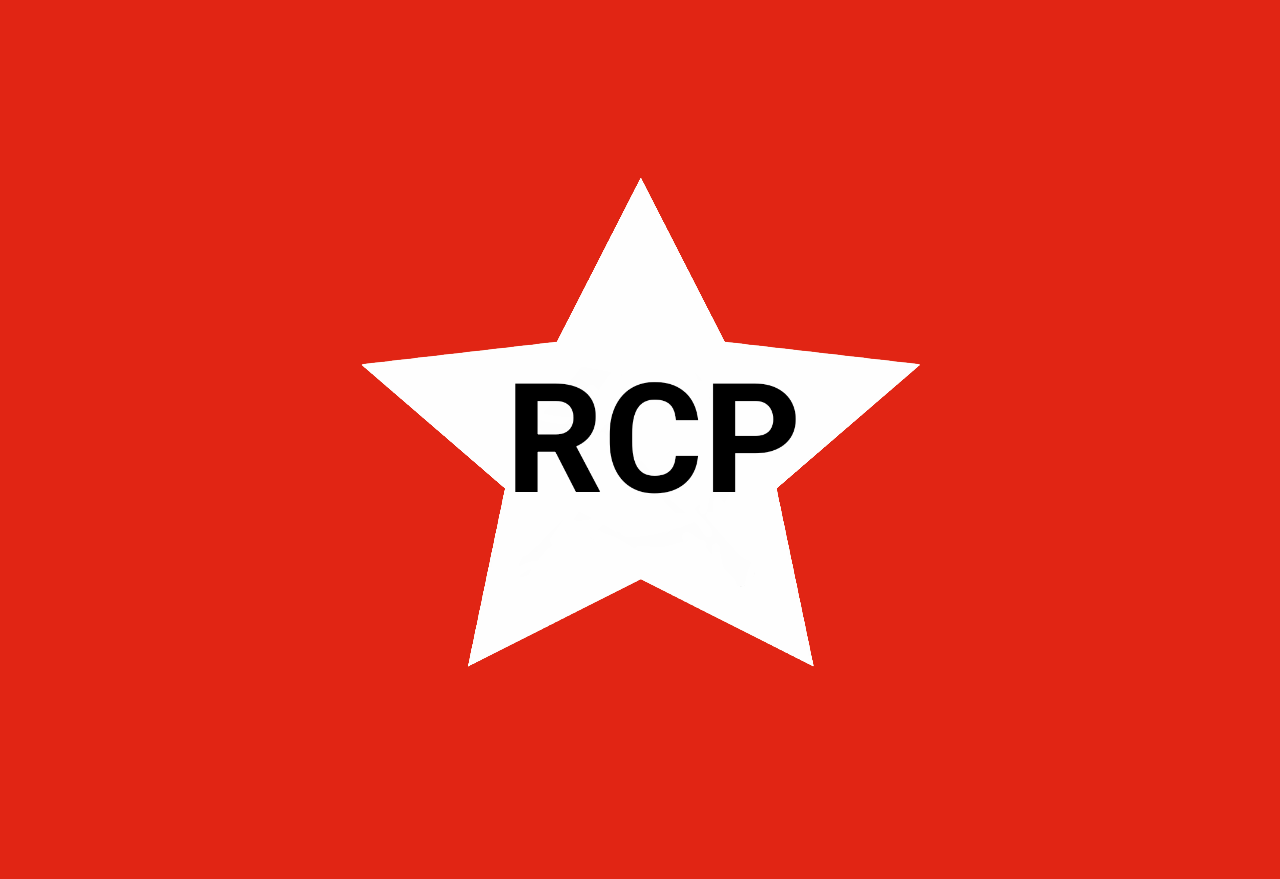

Website
- revcom.us

The Revolutionary Communist Party, USA (also known as the RCP, The Revcoms, or Revcom) is an anti-revisionist communist party in the United States. Founded in 1975, the RCP has its origins in the New Communist movement of the 1960s and 1970s.

Bob Avakian has led the RCP since its founding. RCP is often described as a cult of personality around Avakian. Since the 2000s, the RCP has upheld Avakian's "New Synthesis of Communism" or "New Communism" as its ideology.

== Membership ==
RCP has never published membership numbers. In 1968, BARU started with about 20 members. In 1969 and 1970, the Hoover Institution estimated BARU membership at "less than 100", which then grew "from some 100 to about 300" over 1970 until the split. In early 1971, RU lost about 150–200 members to Venceremos, representing about one third of RU members, suggesting 450–600 before the split and 300–400 after. In 1972, FBI director J. Edgar Hoover said RU was "not large, perhaps several hundred" people. In 1976, the FBI estimated that RCP had 650 members and its youth wing 500, with some overlap. In 2022, historians Aaron J. Leonard and Conor Gallagher estimated that RCP's peak, in 1976, was between 900–1100 people. In 1977, RCP lost about a third of its members to Revolutionary Workers Headquarters, leaving about 600–750. In 1980, The Nation writer George Vickers estimated RCP had 500 members. In 1997, historian Maurice Isserman estimated RCP membership at 300. In 2010, Democratic Socialists of America member William Schulman estimated RCP membership at 300.

== Ideology ==
The RCP originated as a Maoist political organization with roots in the New Left of the 1970s. In the 1980s and 1990s, RCP upheld Marxism–Leninism–Maoism. Since the 2000s, the RCP's ideological framework has been Avakian's "New Synthesis" (or "New Communism"), which RCP sees as a scientific advancement of Marxism–Leninism–Maoism.

=== Cult of personality ===
RCP has often been called a "cult" or "cult-like", with a cult of personality around Avakian. Accusers include New Communist movement veteran Paul Saba (1979), The Indypendent (2014), Harper's (2016), The Intercept (2022), and CounterPunch (2024), among others. In June 2022, a coalition of 23 abortion rights, feminist, and mutual-aid groups released a statement denouncing RCP and the affiliated organization Rise Up 4 Abortion Rights, describing RCP as a cult.

Leonard and Gallagher argue that RCP began developing into a cult of personality around Avakian after his trial for a 1979 Deng Xiaoping protest. RCP pivoted, in hopes of both increasing support for Avakian in the legal arena and making RCP a more revolutionary organization. Avakian was put forward as a larger-than-life figure to revitalize the group, inspired by Joseph Stalin's cult of personality, Mao Zedong's cult of personality, and the more recent Free Huey! campaign, in which Avakian had participated. Avakian framed the development of a cult as a scientific socialist organizational strategy.

=== LGBT issues ===
In the 1970s and 1980s, the RCP called homosexuality "petty bourgeois" and banned gay people from joining the party. RCP's gay ban coexisted with its opposition to gay-bashing and attacks on homosexuals by religious conservatives.

In that period, many New Communist movement and Marxist–Leninist organizations were similarly slow to support gay rights. As the 1970s progressed, other NCM and ML organizations considered RCP unusually "backward" on homosexuality.

RCP ended its gay ban in 2001 and called for a ban on anti-gay discrimination.

== History ==
=== Creation of BARU and battle for SDS ===
In early 1968, Bob Avakian, Leibel Bergman, H. Bruce Franklin, Stephen Charles Hamilton, and about 20 other people formed the Bay Area Revolutionary Union (BARU). BARU's creators came from both former members of the Communist Party USA and Bay Area radicals based in Palo Alto, Berkeley, and San Francisco.

BARU supported an anti-revisionist Marxist–Leninist and Maoist party line, with emphasis on the Black liberation struggle and the liberation of all colonized peoples in and outside the U.S. BARU elaborated its political philosophy in the 1969 pamphlet The Red Papers (later known as Red Papers I). In 1969 and 1970 BARU also published the underground newspaper Maverick, to which Franklin contributed articles under the pseudonym "Will B. Outlaw".

BARU strongly supported the Revolutionary Youth Movement (RYM) faction of Students for a Democratic Society (SDS), which struggled for control of SDS against the Worker Student Alliance (WSA), backed by the Progressive Labor Party (PLP). BARU and PLP disagreed on the Black Panther Party, the Chinese Cultural Revolution, and the direction of Maoism. At the 1969 SDS convention, the RYM-WSA fight led SDS to splinter and collapse. Most SDS members left radical politics. PLP kept the SDS name. RYM splintered into two groups, RYM I and RYM II. RYM I became the Weather Underground Organization. RYM II merged into BARU.

=== Creation of RU and VVAW entryism ===
By 1971, BARU had expanded well beyond the Bay Area, with collectives nationwide. BARU renamed itself the Revolutionary Union (RU). Avakian was elected to the RU central committee shortly thereafter. The RCP claims that of the various groups coming out of SDS, it was the first to seriously attempt to develop itself at the theoretical level, with the publication of Red Papers 1.

In 1971, H. Bruce Franklin led a split of roughly 1/3 of RU members, around 150 to 200 people, to join the more militant Venceremos Organization.

In 1972, the Revolutionary Union created the Attica Brigade as an anti-imperialist student organization, named after the 1971 Attica prison uprising. On March 31–April 1, 1973, the Attica Brigade held an Eastern regional conference that drew 250 attendees from 31 campus chapters. On June 15–17, 1974, the Attica Brigade renamed itself the Revolutionary Student Brigade (RSB) at a conference that drew about 450 attendees from 80 campuses.

In 1973, after the end of the Vietnam War, the antiwar group Vietnam Veterans Against the War (VVAW) began to reform itself. The RU entered into the VVAW, seeking to make it an explicitly anti-imperialist organization and to open its membership to civilians. RU members won influential VVAW positions, including its national council. This peaked in 1975, when the RU-controlled national office voted to remove members, expel chapters, and force members to observe programmatic uniformity. The vast majority of members left, leaving only RU members and RU supporters. In 1980, non-Marxist members of the former VVAW won a lawsuit prohibiting the RU-dominated group from using the VVAW name, logos, or materials. The RU organization renamed itself "Vietnam Veterans Against the War - Anti-Imperialist" (VVAW-AI). Deep animosity persists between the two organizations. VVAW-AI later voted to dissolve itself into the Revolutionary Union.

=== Creation of RCP and 1976 split ===
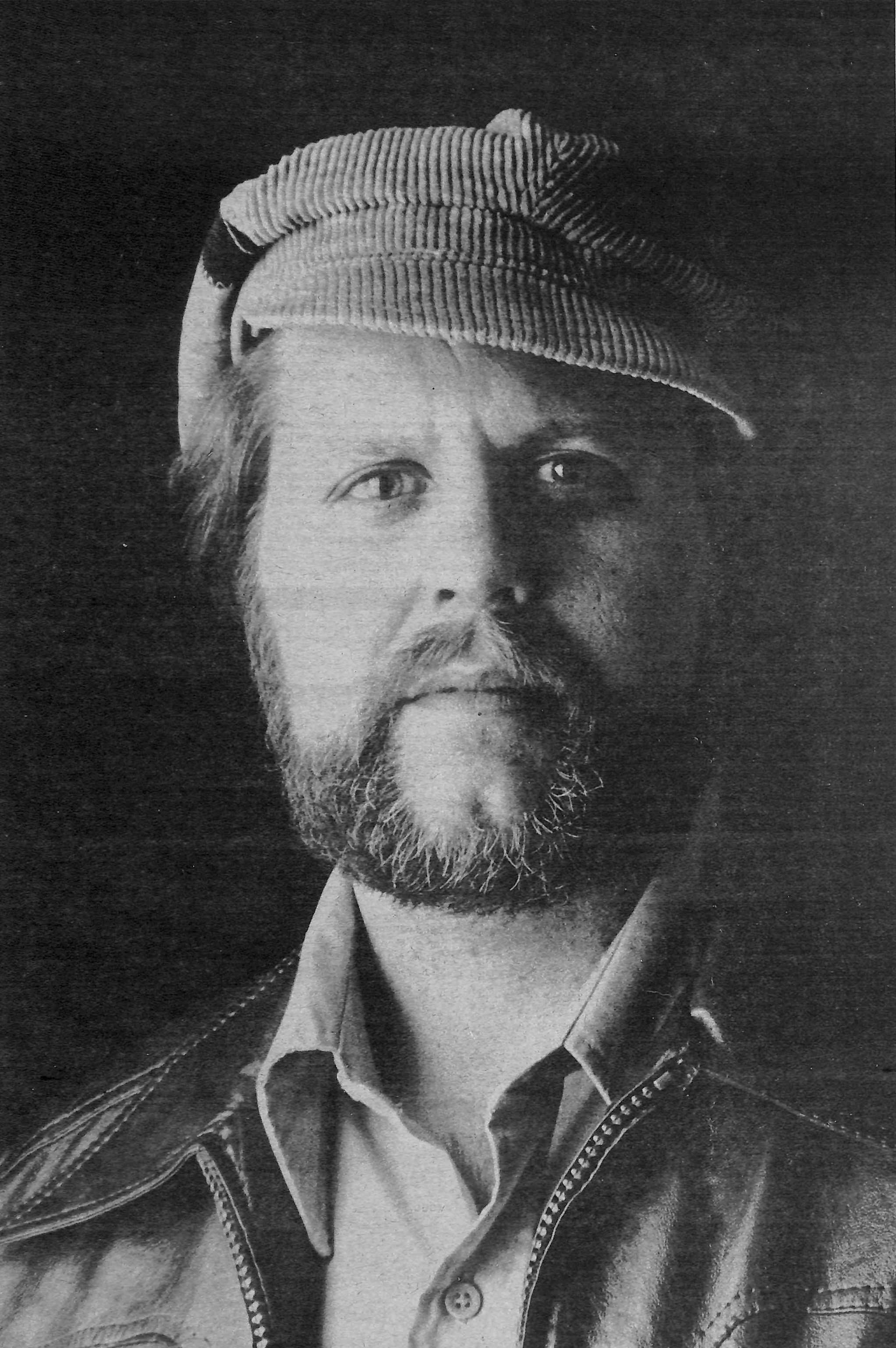
Bob Avakian, c. 1980, taken from first page of the 1982 RCP Constitution.

In September 1975, after the integration of the Revolutionary Union's faction of the VVAW, RU reconstituted itself as the Revolutionary Communist Party (RCP).

In 1976, after Mao Zedong died, the RCP split over which position to take in relation to the new Chinese leadership. About 40% of members, who considered China a socialist country even as Hua Guofeng began to reform it, left and created the Revolutionary Workers Headquarters (RWH). Avakian and the RCP majority considered this a counterrevolutionary coup against Mao's allies. The RCP-RWH split also split the RCP's youth organization. In 1977, RCP youth members created the Revolutionary Communist Youth Brigade (RCYB). RWH youth members kept the Revolutionary Student Brigade (RSB) name. In 1980, the RSB merged with the Student Coalition Against Nukes Nationwide (SCANN) and Midwest Coalition Against Registration and the Draft (MidCARD) to create the Progressive Student Network. RSB members had been active in both of the other organizations.

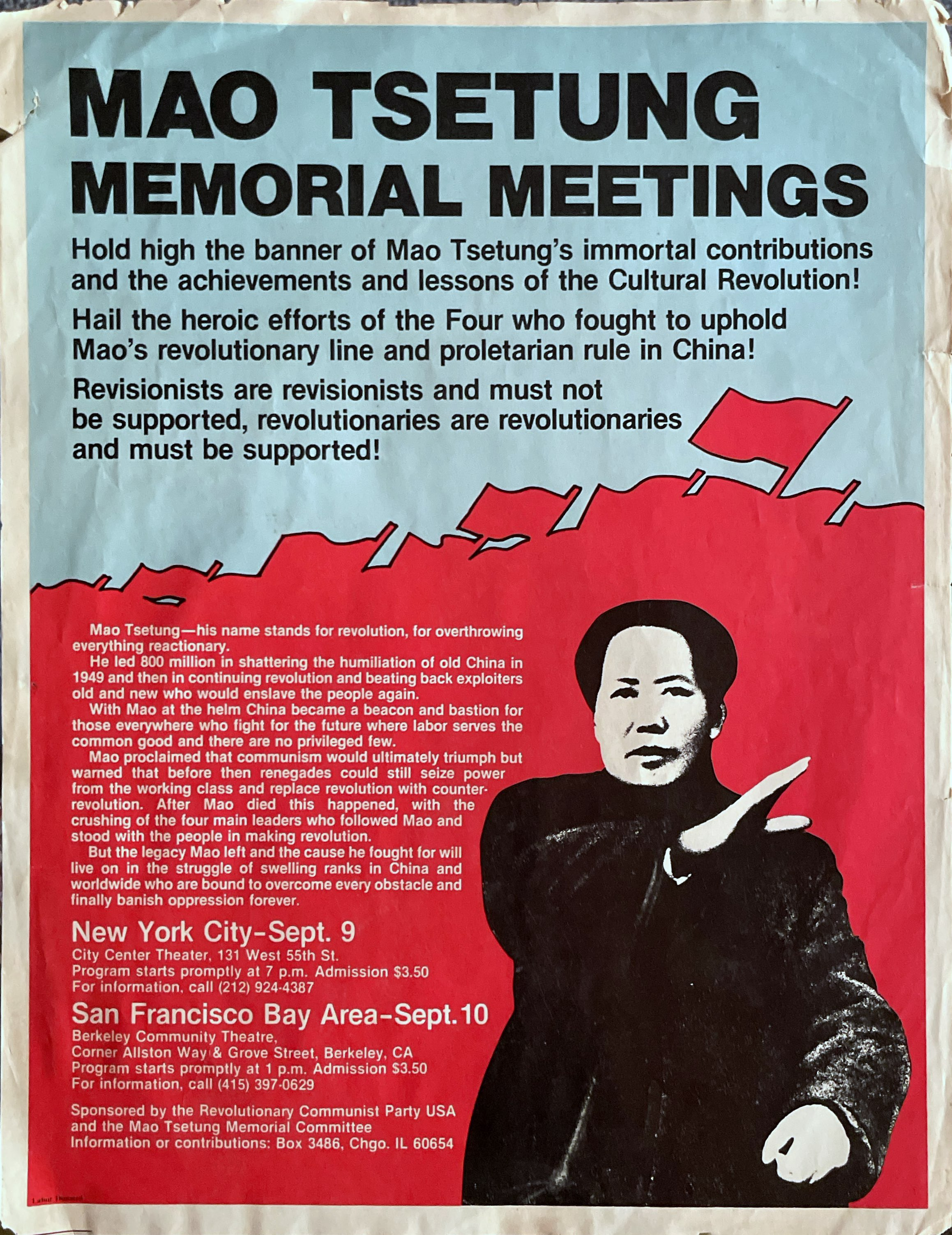
1978 RCP poster commemorating Mao's legacy and denouncing Deng Xiaoping's reforms.

In January 1979, Avakian and 78 other party members and supporters were arrested and charged with various crimes in connection to a militant protest against Deng Xiaoping's visit to the White House. Avakian called Deng a "posturing, boot-licking, and sawed-off pimp". Seventeen demonstrators, including Avakian, were charged with multiple felonies that carried a combined sentence of up to 241 years. RCP focused on political and legal support for the defendants. In 1982, the charges were dropped, but most of the RCP leadership had already fled into exile, with Avakian applying for political asylum in France. He remained in self-imposed exile in France until at least 2010.

=== 1980s ===
In 1980, RCP organized May Day rallies in 16 cities. In April 1980, RCP member Damian Garcia and two others climbed the Alamo to tear down the American flag, raised the Red Flag in its place, and were arrested. On April 22, 1980, Garcia was stabbed to death while organizing in a Los Angeles housing project, Aliso Village. Police said that Garcia's murderer was gang-affiliated, but Avakian insisted that the state had assassinated Garcia in retribution for his Alamo action.

In 1984, Avakian and other RCP members created the Revolutionary Internationalist Movement (RIM), an international for Maoist parties. RIM was united by a founding declaration upholding Marxism–Leninism-Maoism. Other RIM member parties included the Communist Party of Peru – Shining Path, the Union of Iranian Communists (Sarbedaran), and the Revolutionary Communist Group of Colombia.

In 1984, RCP and RCYB member Gregory Lee Johnson burned a U.S. flag during the 1984 Republican National Convention. His arrest led to the 1989 Texas v. Johnson decision, which established burning the U.S. flag as a constitutionally protected right. In 1995, Johnson decried the Flag Desecration Amendment as "fascist".

=== 1990s ===
In the 1980s and 1990s, RCP strongly supported Shining Path's insurgency against the Peruvian state.

In 1991, RCYB members protesting the Gulf War were arrested. In 1992, RCYB members participated in agitation and organization efforts during the Rodney King protests and riots in Los Angeles.

After the Los Angeles riots, RCP attempted to organize in Latino areas of L.A., such as Pico-Union.

=== 2010s ===
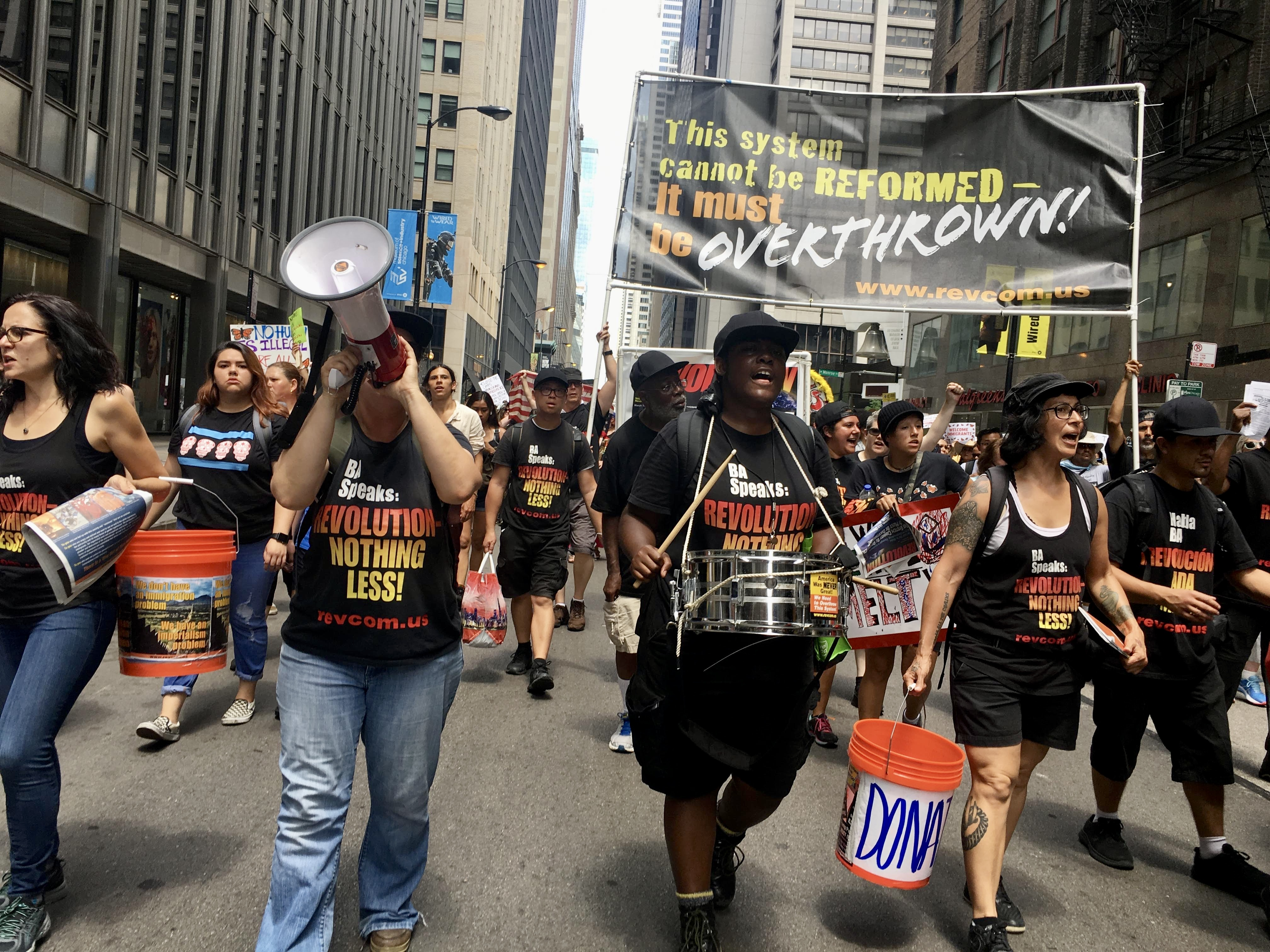
RCP supporters at an immigration rights march in Chicago, 2019.

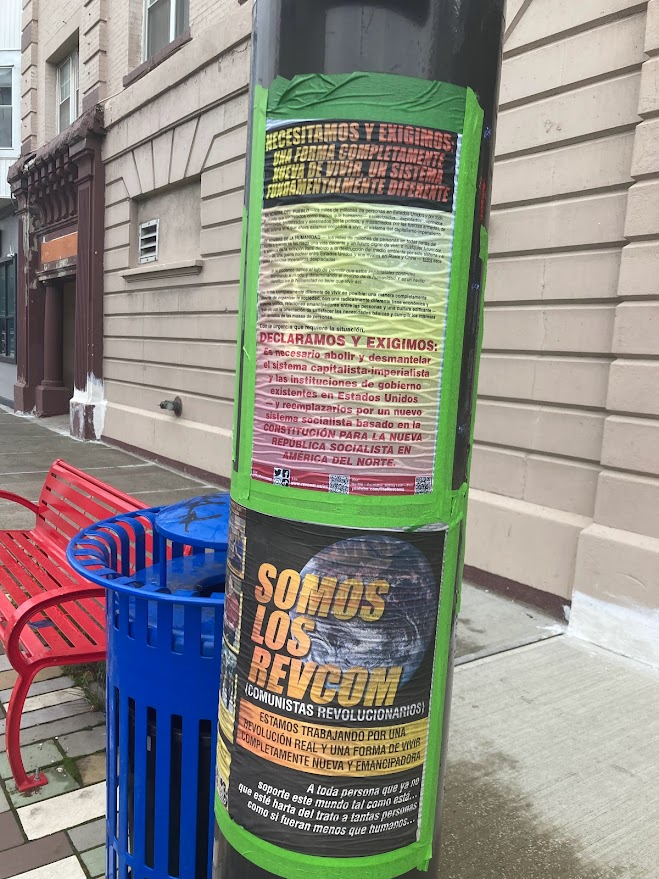
RCP posters in Cleveland, 2023.

In 2011, Cornel West and RCP spokesperson Carl Dix started the campaigns to Stop "Stop and Frisk" and Stop Mass Incarceration. Dix and West appeared on Democracy Now! to discuss the state of Black America in the age of Obama. RCP organized Rise Up October against racism and police brutality; attendees included Quentin Tarantino.

In July 2016, mass protest and police arrests erupted over a flag-burning by the RCP outside the Republican National Convention before a crowd of thousands. The next week, the RCP staged another flag burning outside the Democratic National Convention after denouncing the United States. Later that year, in response to Donald Trump's tweet calling for the criminalization of flag burning, RCP supporters burned another U.S. flag outside the Trump International Hotel in New York City.

In August 2016, during the 2016 Milwaukee riots, the RCP led protesters in a two-day march in front of a barricaded police station after the Milwaukee police shot and killed a black man. The police chief blamed the RCP for "violence toward police".

In September 2016, RCP members handed out fliers outside the San Diego Levi's Stadium in support of Colin Kaepernick and NFL protests of the U.S. national anthem.

In December 2016, after Donald Trump was elected president, RCP members helped create Refuse Fascism, a coalition group aiming to "drive out" the Trump administration through sustained street protests. InfoWars and other far-right conspiracy theory websites claimed the RCP and Refuse Fascism were organizing a military overthrow of the government on November 4, 2017. Several nationwide anti-Trump protest marches were organized for that day, numbering in the thousands.

In September 2017, Refuse Fascism protesters were arrested after blocking four lanes of the 101 Freeway in Los Angeles during rush hour to "sound the alarm about fascism."

In July 2018, Refuse Fascism and RCP organized 100 "handmaids" to protest U.S. Vice President Mike Pence in New York City, calling him "a Christian fascist theocrat for whom The Handmaid's Tale is a model".

In October 2018, the RCP organized a demonstration in Chicago's Daley Plaza on the 23rd Annual "National Day of Protest to STOP Police Brutality", in response to the police murder of Laquan McDonald and other black youth.

In March 2019, police detained a Revolution Newspaper correspondent on the anniversary of the police shooting of Stephon Clark after the correspondent got into an argument with Al Sharpton while urging attendees to organize for revolution rather than political reforms.

On Independence Day 2019, the RCP staged flag burnings at the U.S.–Mexico border and the White House, the latter being a demonstration against the "Salute to America" military parade. Two RCP supporters were attacked by the Proud Boys and arrested by Secret Service officers.

=== 2020s ===
In 2023, RCP members set U.S. flags on fire while protesting a Jason Aldean concert in Chicago.

== Newspaper ==
RCP publishes a newspaper in English and Spanish at revcom.us. In 1974, the RU created its newspaper, Revolution. In 1979, it was renamed Revolutionary Worker. In 2005, it was renamed Revolution again. In the 2010s, RCP branches in major cities began opening Revolution Books stores to sell radical books. RCP runs the Prisoners Revolutionary Literature Fund (PRLF), which sends Revolution to prisoners.

== National conventions ==
RCP has not publicly announced a national congress since 1978.

#	Name	Date	Location	Notes	Reports
1st	Founding Congress	September 1975		RCP founded. Bob Avakian elected Chair of the Central Committee.	Program and Constitution (1975); Communiqué; Avakian's speech
2nd	Second Congress	May 1978			Communiqué; Avakian's speech

== Bibliography ==
=== Books ===
- Elbaum, Max (2002). Revolution In the Air : Sixties Radicals Turn to Lenin, Mao and Che. London: Verso Books. ISBN 9781859846179.
- Leonard, Aaron J.; Gallagher, Conor A. (February 27, 2015). Heavy Radicals - The FBI's Secret War on America's Maoists: The Revolutionary Union / Revolutionary Communist Party 1968-1980. Zero Books. ISBN 978-1-78279-533-9.
- The Red Paper I (1972)
