= New Students for a Democratic Society =

American progressive student organization (2006–)

Students for a Democratic Society
- Abbreviation: SDS
- Leader: none, collective leadership
- Founded: 2006
- Preceded by: Students for a Democratic Society (unofficial)
- Ideology: Progressivism; Anti-war; Anti-racism; Participatory democracy

Website
- new-students-for-a-democratic-society.ghost.io

Students for a Democratic Society (SDS), also called New Students for a Democratic Society (new SDS) is a politically progressive student activist organization in the United States. New SDS is strongly anti-war and embraces participatory democracy, led by students and youth. New SDS formed in 2006, in response to the US invasions of Iraq and Afghanistan, with the aim of rebuilding the student movement.

New SDS takes its name and inspiration from the Students for a Democratic Society of 1960–1969 ("old SDS" or "sixties SDS"), which was the largest anti-capitalist student organization in US history. New SDS has no formal links to old SDS, though several old SDS members helped create new SDS.

SDS members have participated in numerous student protests around the country, primarily anti-war and anti-racism protests, such as the 2024 pro-Palestinian protests on university campuses.

Notable new SDS members include Alan Haber.

== Ideology ==
SDS is a progressive, multi-issue student and youth-led activist organization. SDS is "non-tendency", with members united by a commitment to direct action and participatory democracy, rather than any particular political ideology. SDS is strongly anti-war, anti-racist, anti-sexist, anti-homophobia and anti-transphobia, and anti-police brutality, and anti-authoritarianism. New SDS is inspired by anti-war and Marxist ideals of the old SDS.

New SDS aims to rebuild the student movement through direct action campaigns on college, university, and high school campuses across the United States.

== Membership ==
New SDS started in January 2006 with 3 members, student Jessica Rapchik, student Pat Korte, and old SDS member Alan Haber. By September 2006, new SDS claimed 1000 members and 150 chapters. In April 2007, new SDS claimed over 2,000 members. In January 2008, new SDS claimed over 3,000 members and 120 active chapters. In July 2009, SDS claimed "over 100 chapters". In 2023, SDS claimed "over 40 chapters".

SDS members do not pay dues. SDS has no elected national leadership. Chapters are autonomous and freely pursue campaigns of interest.

== History ==
=== Re-formation ===
In January 2006, students opposed to the Iraq invasion hoped to revive the 1960s Students for a Democratic Society took shape. Two high school students, Jessica Rapchik and Pat Korte, decided to reach out to former members of the "Sixties" SDS, to re-establish a student movement in the United States. Korte did this by contacting Alan Haber. They called for a new generation of SDS, to build a radical multi-issue organization grounded in the principle of participatory democracy. Several chapters at various colleges and high schools were subsequently formed. On Martin Luther King Jr. Day of 2006, these chapters banded together to issue a press release that stated their intentions to recreate the national SDS organization.

In the press release, new SDS called for the organization's first national convention since 1969 to be held in the summer of 2006 and to have it preceded by a series of regional conferences occurring during the Memorial Day weekend. These regional conferences would also be the first of their kind since 1969. On April 23, 2006, SDS held a northeast regional conference at Brown University. New SDS held its first national convention from August 4 to August 7, 2006 at the University of Chicago.

The Freedom Road Socialist Organization helped create new SDS, which has significant FRSO leadership and FRSO collaboration.

=== 2000s ===
Alternative logo used by some SDS chapters

In March 2006, Pace University SDS protested against a speech by Bill Clinton at the University's New York City campus, prompting the university to hand over two students, Lauren Giaccone and Brian Kelly, to the United States Secret Service. After Pace threatened to expel the protesters, Pace SDS began a campaign that helped pressure the President of Pace to resign.

From July 27–30 2007, the second SDS National Convention took place at Wayne State University in Detroit, Michigan. Approximately 200 members of SDS attended what was a constitutional convention. The primary focus of the convention was to democratically create a national structure and vision for the organization. These goals were achieved, though all decisions made at the convention will be sent back to SDS chapters for a process of ratification which is currently under way.

From September 1–4 2008, SDS members and chapters from around the country converged on St. Paul, Minnesota to participate in four days of protest against the 2008 Republican National Convention.

On September 22 2008, Providence SDS members took over a board meeting of the Rhode Island Public Transit Authority RIPTA to protest proposed route cuts. SDS argued that the RIPTA board is detached from its riders and doesn't represent them.

=== 2010s ===
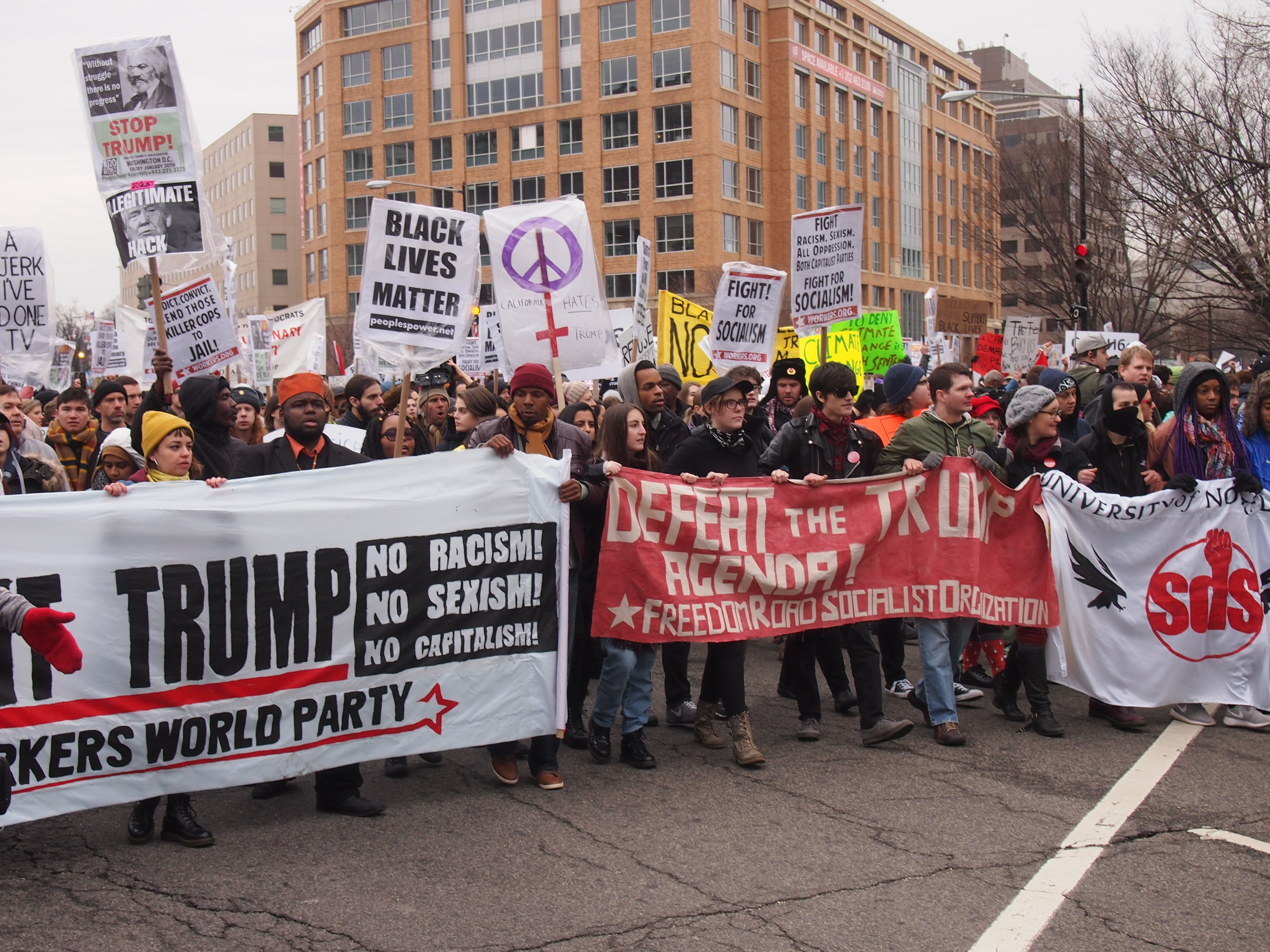
SDS and FRSO protesters in January 2017 at DisruptJ20

In March 2010, University of Houston SDS joined the March 4 National Day of Action to Defend Education, along with SDS chapters nationwide.

In March 2010, University of Wisconsin Milwaukee SDS members staged a protest outside the Chancellor's building. The event, designed to protest rising tuition costs, was met with a police presence. Police began using pepper spray, and arrested sixteen members of the protest, including both SDS members and allied organizations on campus through the Education Rights Campaign.

=== 2020s ===
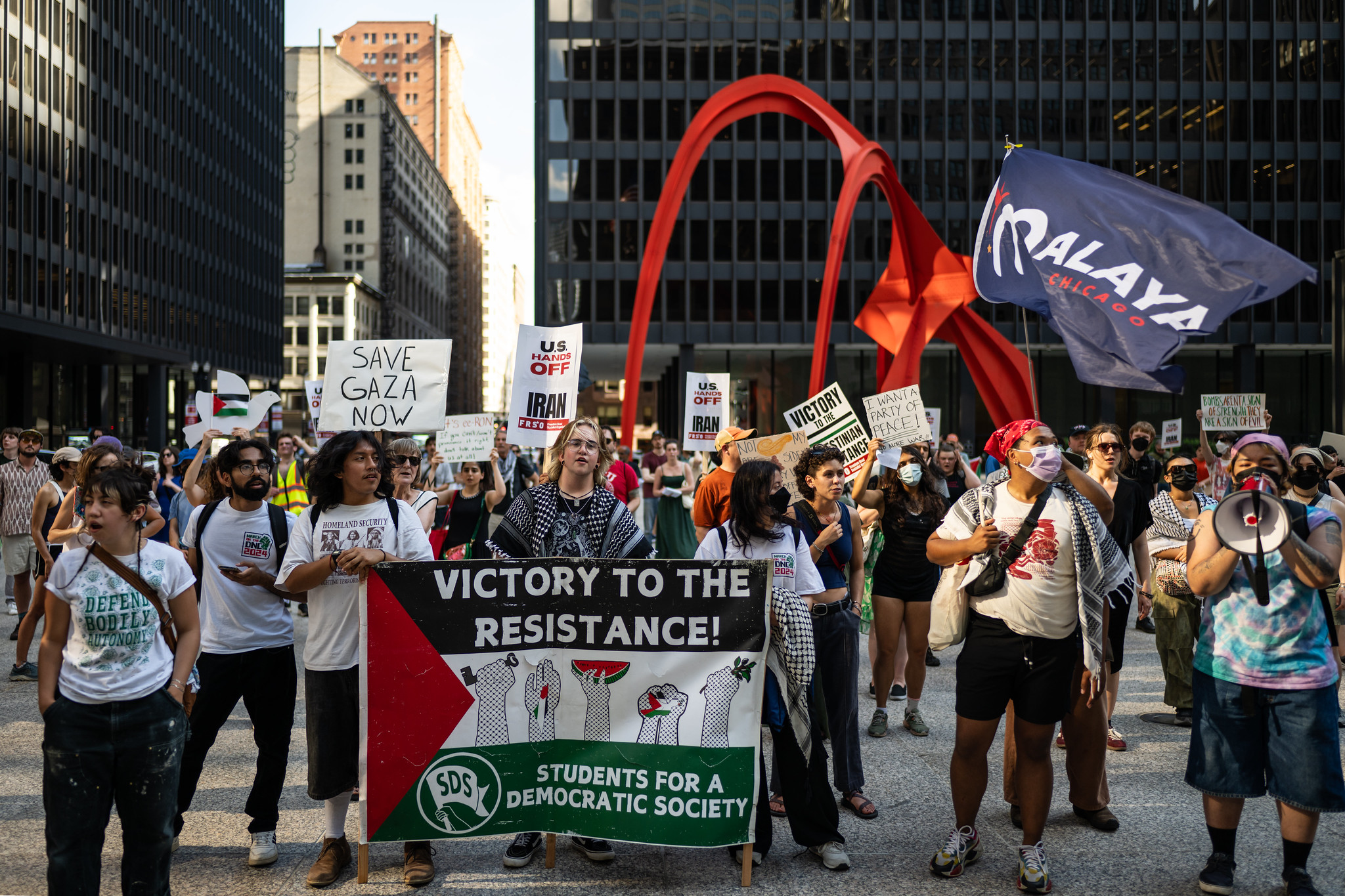
SDS and FRSO members in a June 24, 2025 Chicago pro-Palestine, anti-war rally (specifically against bombing Iran)

In 2024, SDS chapters across the country began or participated in encampments as part of the 2024 pro-Palestinian protests on university campuses. Notable encampments included those at the University of Minnesota Twin Cities Campus, Auraria Campus in Denver, the University of Washington Seattle campus, Tulane University, Florida State University, University of Wisconsin Milwaukee, Willamette University, and the University of South Florida. The University of Minnesota Twin Cities chapter occupied a campus administrative building.

In July and August 2024, SDS participated in marches on the 2024 Republican National Convention and the 2024 Democratic National Convention.

In 2025, SDS chapters and members joined the protests against Trump's mass deportation. In April 2025, SDS chapters joined protests against the Trump administration's international student visa revocations and deportations.

== Conventions ==
Due to Freedom Road Socialist Organization's tight links with SDS, Fight Back! News has posted an article for nearly all SDS conventions.

#	Name	Date	Location	Attendees	Notes	Reports
19th	2025 National Convention	October 11–12, 2025	University of Wisconsin–Milwaukee	over 250 members from over 40 chapters		Invite
18th	2024 National Convention	October 12–13, 2024	Auraria Campus			Invite; Resolutions; Points of Unity (2024-)
17th	2023 National Convention	October 14–15, 2023	University of Illinois Chicago	180 members from 20 chapters		Invite; Resolutions
16th	2022 National Convention	Oct 15–16, 2022	Kent State University	about 90 members		Resolutions
15th	2021 National Convention	Oct 16–17, 2021	University of Minnesota	almost 170 members		Invite; Resolutions
14th	2019 National Convention	Sept 20, 2019	University of North Florida	over 80 members from 12 chapters		Invite; Resolutions
13th	2018 National Convention	Oct 20–21, 2018	University of Utah	not stated		Resolutions; Points of Unity (2018-2023)
12th	2017 National Convention	Oct 21–22, 2017	UC Santa Barbara	over 95 members		
11th	2016 National Convention	Oct 8–9, 2016	University of Minnesota			
10th	2015 National Convention	October 10–11, 2015	University of Wisconsin–Milwaukee			Resolutions
9th	2014 National Convention	Oct 10–11, 2014	University of Minnesota			Resolutions
8th	2013 National Convention	Oct 12–13, 2013	Austin Peay State University	over 100 members		Report
7th	2012 National Convention	Oct 27–28, 2012	University of Florida	70 members		Report; Resolutions
6th	2011 National Convention	Nov 12–13, 2011	University of Wisconsin–Milwaukee	over 150 members		Report
5th	2010 National Convention	Oct 22–24, 2010	University of Wisconsin–Milwaukee	around 100 members from 20 cities		Report
4th	2009 National Convention	July 11–12, 2009	Middle Tennessee State University	around 100 members		
3rd	2008 National Convention	July 24–27, 2008	University of Maryland, College Park	about 120 members	Convention finally decided on a national structure, the National Working Committee, which had a representative from each region, working group, and caucus for oppressed groups.	Convention bulletin
2nd	2007 National Convention	July 27–30, 2007	Wayne State University	about 150 members or 200 members	Michael Albert attended and favorably compared the organization to old SDS. Convention developed a draft national structure and constitution, sent back to SDS chapters for ratification.	Proposals pending ratification; Ratified proposals; Convention Bulletin; Principles of Unity (2007-2017); Who We Are; Wiki
1st	2006 National Convention	August 4–7, 2006	University of Chicago	about 100 members or 200 members	Alan Haber attended and hoped that old SDS members might teach new SDS members how to avoid old SDS's mistakes.	

== See also ==
- Global justice movement
- List of anti-war organizations
- Peace movement
