= Jason Flores-Williams =

American writer and attorney

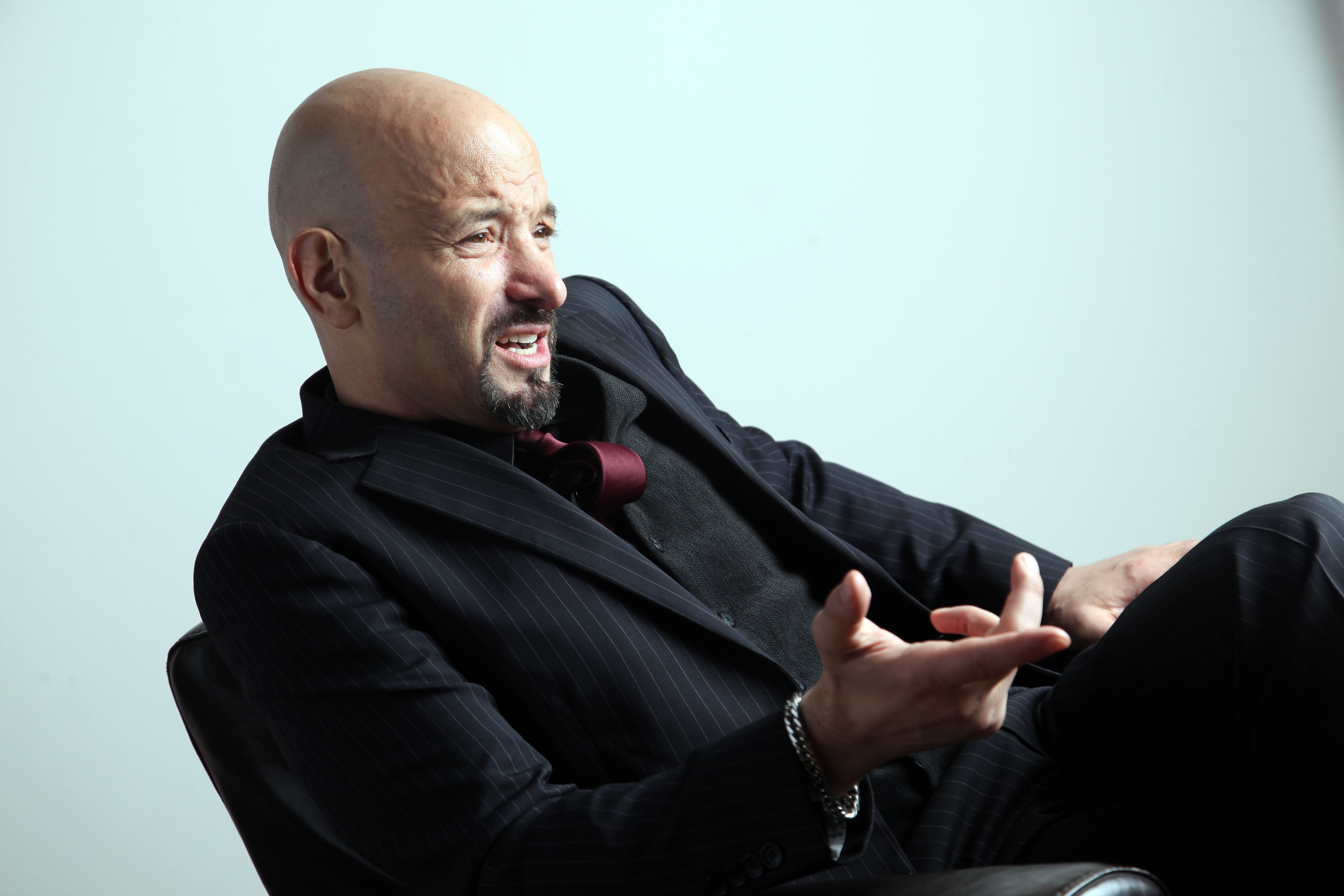
- Jason Flores-Williams
- Born: 1969 (age 56–57); Los Angeles
- Education: Hunter College (A.B.) Rutgers Law School (J.D.)
- Occupation: Attorney
- Years active: 2007–present
- Website: Jason Flores Williams

Jason Flores-Williams (born 1969, Los Angeles, CA) is an author, political activist, and civil rights attorney. He is best known for his legal work on behalf of death row clients, political protesters, the homeless population of Denver, and his suit to have the Colorado River recognized as a legal person. Flores-Williams is an acknowledged expert in conspiracy law and First Amendment cases whose views are frequently sought by media organizations, including the Washington Post, the New York Times, and the Los Angeles Times. He was also a lead organizer of the protests against the 2004 Republican National Convention. He lives in Denver, Colorado.

== Biography ==
Jason Flores-Williams' parents are Camille Flores, a New Mexican journalist and newspaper editor, and Drake Williams, a CPA and small business owner. He was raised in Texas outside of Houston. In the early 1980s, he moved to Santa Fe, New Mexico with his family. There, his father was convicted along with his twin brother of involvement with illicit drug trafficking and was sentenced to 35 years in prison. After his father's conviction, Flores-Williams dropped out of high school and moved to Washington, DC, where he self-educated at the Library of Congress and got his GED. He spent the late 80s living in Harlem across from the Apollo Theater, and graduated from Hunter College at CUNY with an honors degree in Philosophy. He spent the early 90s in Prague where he wrote and worked as the first pizza delivery boy in post-Soviet Eastern Europe. He later moved to San Francisco to focus on writing. He is the grandson of William Flores, one of the founding fathers of League of United Latin American Citizens.

== Literary career ==
After moving to San Francisco, Flores-Williams' first book was End of the West. Published in 1996, it describes his bohemian lifestyle in the city. His follow up novel, Last Stand of Mr. America was a called "a ferocious portrait of a San Francisco public relations yuppie who lives a double life in underground sex clubs seeking salvation and meaning" and Flores-Williams was called "an all-American outlaw and edge-walker in the tradition of Jack Kerouac, Charles Bukowski, and Biggie Smalls" by novelist David Gates. He was also helped start the Litstock festival. After traveling to Scotland to get a 2nd edition of the novel published in 2004, Flores-Williams moved to New York where he became a blogger for High Times.

== Activism and legal career ==
In the September/October 2004 edition of High Times entitled, How to get Arrested, Jason Flores-Williams wrote the lead article entitled, A Call to Resistance, a guide for people looking to protest the 2004 Republican National Convention In May 2004, he was arrested leading a die-in staged on Fifth Avenue in Manhattan to protest the invasion of Iraq by the US. After the convention protests, Flores-Williams became disillusioned with protest politics and completed his J.D. degree at Rutgers Law School.

After graduating from law school, Flores-Williams worked for the Capital Appeals Project representing indigent clients on death row in post-Hurricane Katrina New Orleans. He moved back to Santa Fe, and represented US fugitive from justice and former Republic of New Afrika member Charlie Hill in his attempts to prevent his extradition from Cuba to face murder charges for the alleged killing a police officer. Hill was eventually allowed by the Cuban government to remain in the country and not extradited to the US. He also represented a Vietnam Veteran suffering from PTSD who was denied benefits from the Veterans Administration because he lived in Cuba, which the veteran eventually lost.

After moving to Denver, Flores-Williams represented a group of homeless people living in Denver in a class-action lawsuit seeking an end to the city's practice of confiscating their property and the clearing their encampments from the city streets. It was alleged that the city had used flamethrowers to burn the homeless people's possessions after the raids and held a BBQ where the sweeps had occurred. Class-action status for the homeless people suing the city was initially denied, but was ultimately approved. Three of the homeless people who were a part of the lawsuit were convicted of violating the city's ordinance on camping.

After the mass arrests at the DisruptJ20 during the Inauguration of President Donald Trump in January 2017, Flores-Williams was the attorney for the first three defendants facing charges of property destruction or assaults on police.

In September 2017, Flores-Williams filed a controversial lawsuit on behalf of the Colorado River claiming that the river is a legal person and suing the state of Colorado and current Colorado Governor John Hickenlooper "for violating the river’s 'right to exist, flourish, regenerate, be restored, and naturally evolve.'" The lawsuit was eventually dismissed with prejudice by Flores-Williams due to the threat of legal sanctions from the Colorado Attorney General's Office who stated, "the case itself unacceptably impugned the State’s sovereign authority to administer natural resources for public use, and was well beyond the jurisdiction of the judicial branch of government." Flores-Williams stated regarding the dismissal, “Situations change, and what is best for the rights of nature movement is not to get involved in a lengthy sanctions battle, but to move forward with seeking environmental justice.”

== The 2020 Colorado avalanche case ==
In March 2020, two Colorado snowboarders, Tyler DeWitt and Evan Hannibal, accidentally triggered an avalanche that led to the temporary closure of a road in rural Summit County. Although nobody was injured in the avalanche, local prosecutors charged DeWitt and Hannibal the following month with reckless endangerment and sought $168,000 in restitution. Both defendants pled not guilty and announced their intention to fight the charges. As the lawyer representing the two men, Flores-Williams put the state on the defensive, forcing Colorado state District Attorney Bruce Brown to wade into the case to publicly defend the prosecution. In addition to being unjust on their merits, Flores-Williams attacked the charges as potentially setting a dangerous precedent related to the regulation of recreation and sporting activities throughout the state and beyond. The charges, Flores-Williams said, were

an attempt to send a chilling message and criminalize the backcountry. In taking these cases, our goal is not simply to prevail, but also to stop that message from being sent. In our minds, there are certain zones that we cannot let the state enter into and limit the few liberties and freedoms we have left.

== Mexico City Office and international criminal law practice ==
In 2020, Flores-Williams opened a law office in downtown Mexico City. His first international office is focused on protecting the rights of Mexican nationals charged with drug offenses in the U.S. legal system. Flores-Williams is descended from Mexican heritage on his father’s side, whose arrest and abuse at the hands of the U.S.-led “war on drugs” continues to inspire and guide his life’s work. Flores-Williams described what he calls “the family tradition of the fight for justice” in conversation with the Mexican newspaper Pie en Pagina, where he explained his efforts to initiate "large scale" litigation actions across the globe.

The Mexico City office collaborates with human rights groups throughout Latin America. Along with enforcing currently established rights, the strategic mission of the Mexico City office is to assert rights for rights-less people through litigation that synthesizes American constitutional and international law.

== Disbarment in Colorado ==
On November 21, 2025, the Colorado Presiding Disciplinary Judge disbarred Flores-Williams in the state of Colorado for allegedly pressuring a client to sign a plea agreement and mishandling her money while also propositioning her for sex and cocaine, and for mishandling a separate client's funds.

== Bibliography ==
- Flores-Williams, J. (1996) The end of the west. San Francisco: Caught Inside Press. OCLC 50990498
- Flores-Williams, J. (1998) The Last Stand of Mr. America. San Francisco: Caught Inside Press. OCLC 752309343
- Flores-Williams, J. (2004) The Incarceration of Ivan Brown. Alexander, VA: Alexander Street Press. OCLC 304164814
- Flores-Williams, J. (2004) The Inside of Despair. Alexander, VA: Alexander Street Press. OCLC 304164821
- Flores-Williams, J. (2020) The Dead Sea.

== Further reading by Jason Flores-Williams ==
- Farewell to CBGB's , The Brooklyn Rail
- Still Standing: Jason Flores-Williams and the American Condition, Flavorwire
- In the Battle of the Open Heart , The Brooklyn Rail
- My Wounded Constitution, The Brooklyn Rail
- The Funny Thing About the Rise of Fascism, Westword
