= American Deserters Committee =

Group of American Armed Forces deserters who went to Canada during the Vietnam War

The American Deserters Committee (ADC) of Montreal, Quebec, Canada was a group of American Armed Forces members who deserted their posts and went to Canada to avoid the Vietnam War. The deserters were aided in their efforts by groups such as Students for a Democratic Society, the Black Panthers, the Revolutionary Union, The Resistance, American Friends Service Committee, War Resisters League and the Committee for Peace and Freedom.

ADC was formed by a group of politically active deserters, including David Beauchesne in December 1968, modeled on existing Deserters' Committees in Paris and Stockholm. ADC members included both deserters and their spouses and girlfriends, and welcomed other expatriate Americans who shared their views. Though ADC retained almost total ideological independence, it sought donations from various sources.

ADC published a newsletter called ADC Times. By the early summer of 1970, friction within ADC began to emerge over the group's inner circle of founders and colleagues, who had begun calling themselves the "Central Committee." The Committee was seen by many as increasingly autocratic and undemocratic, adopting a radical, Marxist agenda, and discouraging dissent.

In 1971, the ADC merged with the MCAWR, forming the American Refugee Service.

== See also ==
- List of anti-war organizations
