= Freedom Road Socialist Organization =

Marxist–Leninist political organization in the United States

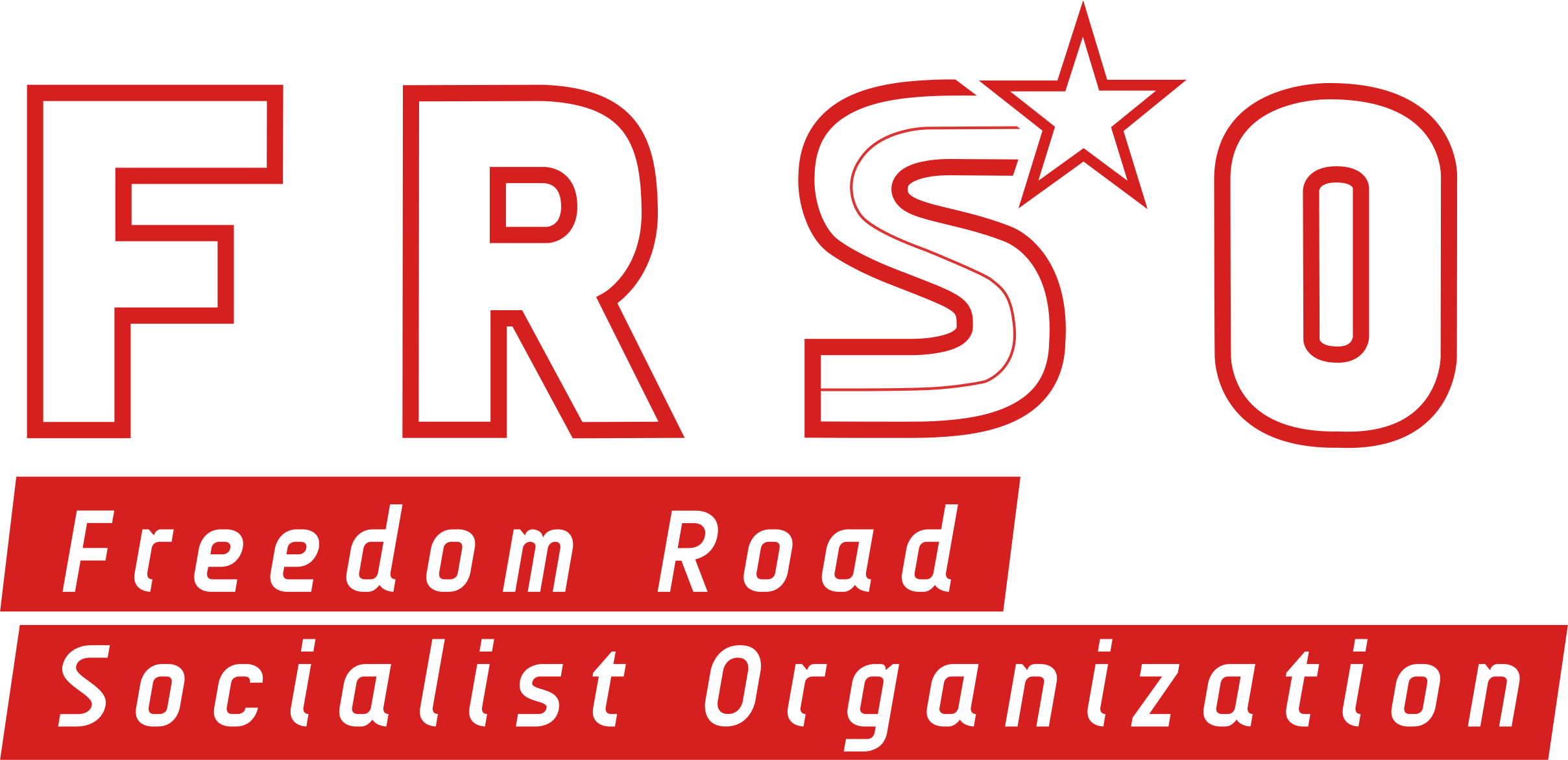
- Abbreviation: FRSO
- Founded: 1985; 41 years ago
- Merger of: Revolutionary Workers Headquarters (1985), Proletarian Unity League (1985), Organization for Revolutionary Unity (1986), Amilcar Cabral/Paul Robeson Collective (1988), Socialist Organizing Network (1996)
- Headquarters: Minneapolis, Minnesota
- Newspaper: Fight Back! News
- Membership (2026): ▲2,100
- Ideology: Communism; Marxism–Leninism; Maoism
- Political position: Far-left
- Colors: Red

Website
- frso.org

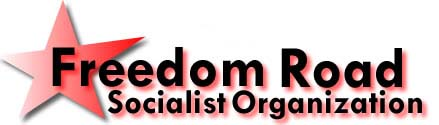
Previous FRSO logo

The Freedom Road Socialist Organization (FRSO) is a communist political organization in the United States. FRSO formed in 1985 as a merger of several New Communist movement organizations.

The organization describes itself as revolutionary socialist and Marxist-Leninist, seeking to "build a new, revolutionary, communist party" in the United States.

== History ==
=== Origins ===
Logo of the FRSO as it appeared in a 1985 pamphlet

In 1985, the Proletarian Unity League and the Revolutionary Workers Headquarters merged to create FRSO. In 1986, FRSO fused with the Organization for Revolutionary Unity. In 1988, FRSO absorbed the Amílcar Cabral-Paul Robeson Collective.

In 1993, FRSO merged with the Socialist Organizing Network (SON) and adopted the placeholder name "Freedom Road Socialist Organization / Socialist Organizing Network" (FRSO/SON). The SON was formed by former members of the League of Revolutionary Struggle (LRS), which had dissolved in the late 1980s. The 1994 FRSO Congress, which formalized the merger, was called the "First Congress of FRSO/SON". However, no new name emerged, and FRSO/SON reverted back to FRSO afterwards.

FRSO's component groups believed that ultraleftism was the US New Communist movement's main error. Merging under the FRSO banner, these groups hoped to consolidate the movement's remnants in a single organization and move beyond the sectarianism that marked the previous decades.

=== 1999 split ===
In response to the 1989 Tiananmen Square protests and the dissolution of the Soviet Union, FRSO began to develop two distinct positions on socialist countries. The "Left Refoundation" group, aligned with democratic socialism, argued that these events resulted from a deep crisis of Marxism. The "Fight Back!" group, aligned with Marxism-Leninism, argued that these events resulted from revisionism rather than failures within Marxism. These divisions grew during the 1990s. In 1998, the Left Refoundation group wrote an internal document, "Theses on Left Refoundation", and requested an organization-wide discussion. The FRSO National Executive Committee (NEC) unanimously rejected this discussion. In 1999, the Left Refoundation group received a second hearing, at which the NEC and FRSO as a whole split in two.

Both factions claimed the name "Freedom Road Socialist Organization". In 2006, the Left Refoundation group renamed itself to "FRSO/OSCL", combining the English and Spanish acronym. In 2019, the Left Refoundation group renamed itself to Liberation Road.

=== FBI raid ===
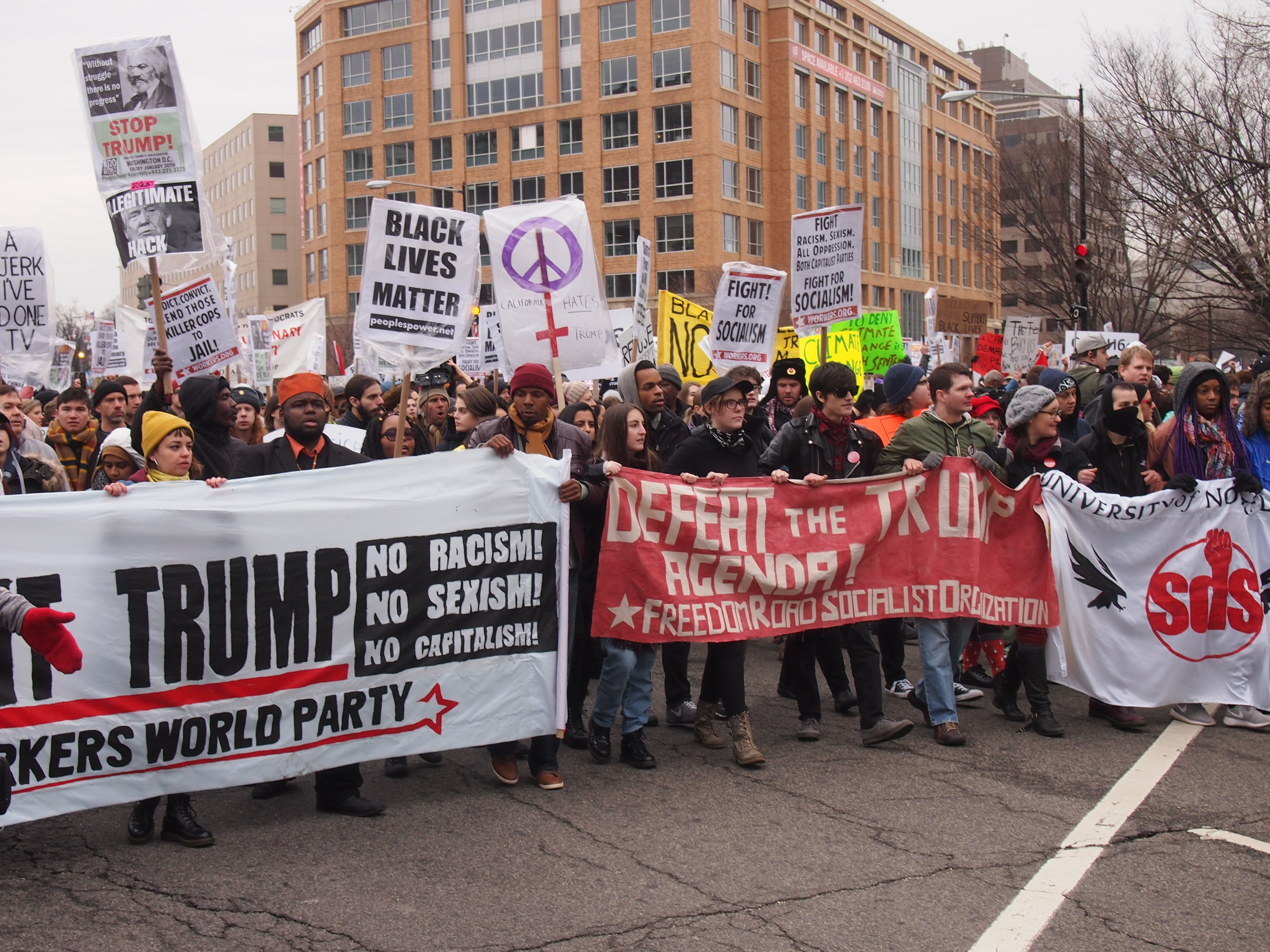
FRSO and new SDS protesters in January 2017 at DisruptJ20

On September 24, 2010, over 70 FBI agents raided the homes of six antiwar activists, five of whom were FRSO members, as well as the Anti-War Committee (AWC) headquarters. The FBI claimed to be searching for evidence of "material support of terrorism". FRSO formed the "Committee to Stop FBI Repression" and claimed that FBI agents left behind documents indicating that the raids were aimed at people suspected of FRSO membership, due to the AWC's political support for the Revolutionary Armed Forces of Colombia (FARC) and Popular Front for the Liberation of Palestine (PFLP). FRSO further claimed that the FBI had placed informants inside its organization.

On February 26, 2014, a federal judge unsealed the extensive documents the FBI collected during its nearly three-year surveillance of FRSO. The FBI never charged any person involved.

== Ideology ==
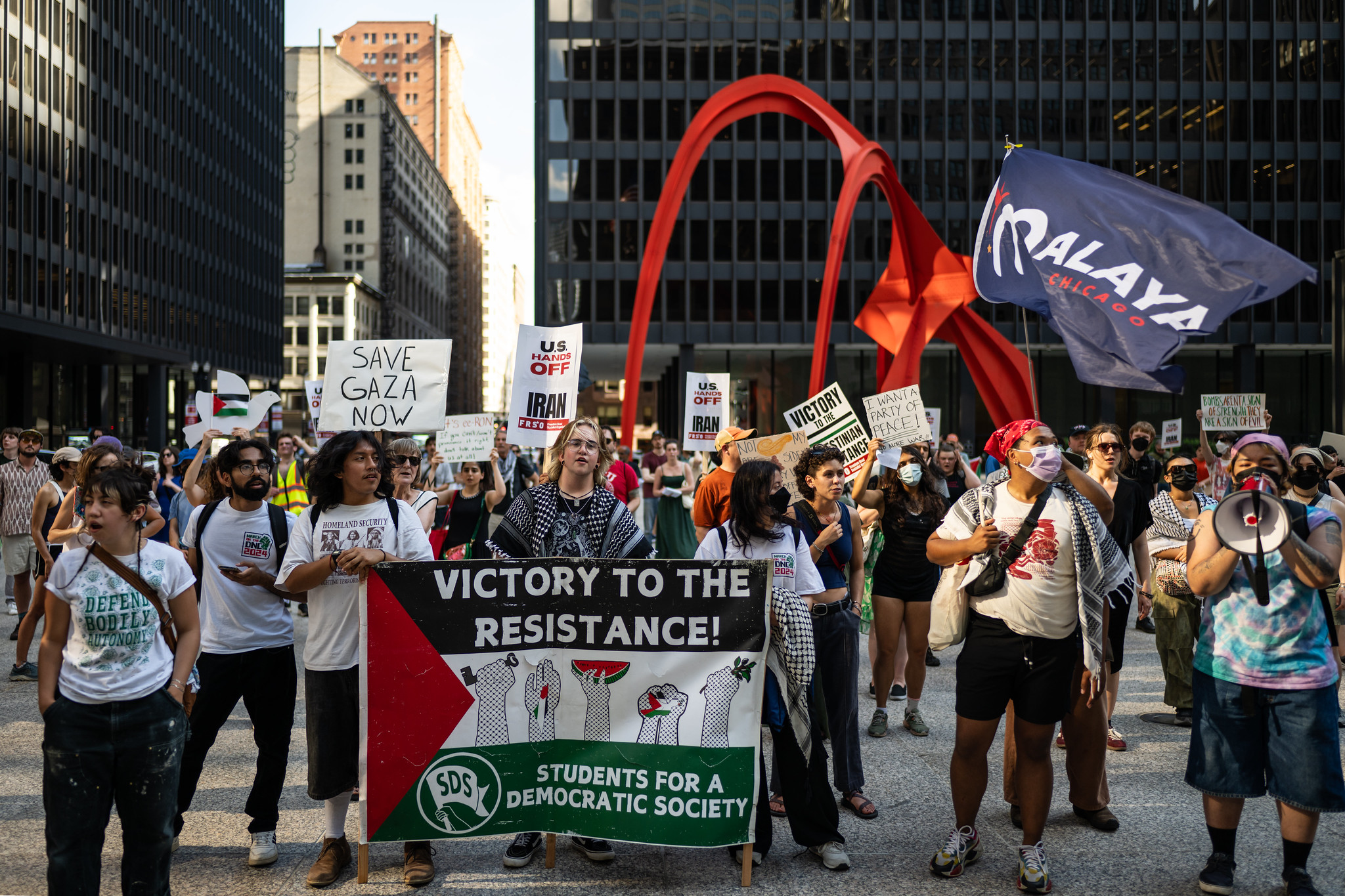
FRSO and new SDS members in a June 24, 2025 Chicago pro-Palestine, anti-war rally (specifically against bombing Iran)

FRSO is a Marxist–Leninist and democratic centralist organization.

In labor, FRSO advocates a strategy of the building of a "militant minority" within the unions and opposing "collaborating union officials".

In elections, FRSO generally encourages members to tactically vote against the "most reactionary" candidate, usually Republicans. However, in the 2024 election, FRSO stated "we don’t advocate voting for Harris as a way to oppose Trump", as a result of Harris' support for Israel bombing Palestine.

FRSO recognizes China, Cuba, Laos, North Korea, and Vietnam as socialist countries. FRSO "positively evaluates" Albania, the Soviet Union, and the Warsaw Pact countries, but argues they "gave up on Marxism". FRSO also supports the United Socialist Party of Venezuela and Nicolas Maduro as "leading the masses of people in building a new society". FRSO participates in the annual International Communist Seminar. FRSO is Anti-Zionist.

== Membership ==
Mick Kelly, FRSO Political Secretary

FRSO has two levels of membership. "General" members pay dues annually and must attend one online seminar per year. "Cadre" members must adhere to Leninist organizational norms, including democratic centralism.

In December 2020, FRSO claimed "over 500" general members. In March 2021, FRSO claimed almost 1000 members and "hundreds" of cadre.

=== Associated groups ===
FRSO's publishes the newspaper Fight Back! News and its Spanish version Lucha y Resiste.

In 2002, FRSO created the Anti-War Committee (AWC), which it leads. In 2008, the AWC protested the 2008 Republican National Convention.

In 2006, FRSO helped create the new Students for a Democratic Society (SDS or "new SDS"), which has significant FRSO leadership and FRSO collaboration.

=== National conventions ===
The table below includes only the "Fight Back!" majority faction, which retains the FRSO name.

Name	Date	Statement	Main Political Report	Program	Notes
10th Congress	May 2026	We have nothing to lose but our chains!	Three parts: 1, 2, 3		
9th Congress	Spring 2022	Seize the Time	Three parts: 1, 2, 3	Program	
8th Congress	May 2018	Statement	2018 MPR	Program	
7th Congress	2014	Statement	Three parts: 1, 2, 3		
6th Congress	2010	Congress of Victory	2010 MPR		before FBI raids
5th Congress	May 2007	Period of Struggle	2007 MPR	Program	no program before 2007
4th Congress	June 2004	Building on Success	2004 MPR		
3rd Congress	May 2001	2001 Unity Statement	2001 MPR		after split, Fight Back! group explicitly gave FRSO "Marxist-Leninist" label
2nd Congress	November 1997	FRSO Strategy			before 1999 split
1st Congress	1994	1993 Unity Statement			merged FRSO and SON
n/a	1986	ORU Merges			merged FRSO and ORU
Unity Conference	October 1985	1985 Unity Statement			merged RWH and PUL

== See also ==
- American Left
- History of the socialist movement in the United States
- New Communist Movement
- Democratic Socialists of America
- Communist Party USA
- Revolutionary Communist Party, USA
