= Revolution in the Air =

2002 history book about the New Communist movement

Revolution in the Air: Sixties Radicals Turn to Lenin, Mao and Che
- Cover of the first edition
- Author: Max Elbaum
- Language: English
- Subject: New Communist movement
- Genre: Politics, history, memoir
- Publisher: Verso Books
- Publication date: 2002
- Publication place: United States
- Media type: Print (hardcover, paperback), Amazon Kindle
- Pages: 320 (first edition)
- ISBN: 978-1859846179
- Website: https://revolutionintheair.org

Revolution in the Air: Sixties Radicals Turn to Lenin, Mao and Che is a history book by Max Elbaum. First published in 2002, it was reissued in 2006 and 2018. The book chronicles a post-1968 offshoot of the New Left, in which a racially diverse group of young American radicals embraced an ultra-left Marxist-Leninist variant that Elbaum refers to as "Third World Marxism". This political mobilization, which he took part in, was embodied in the New Communist movement (NCM). Revolution in the Air charts the rise and demise of the NCM, analyzes its strengths and weaknesses, and gives the author's retrospective assessment of the lessons learned.

== Synopsis ==
Elbaum says in the Preface to the 2006 edition that he wrote the book "to fill in a blank spot in the literature on US radicalism by providing a roadmap of post-1960s Third World Marxism and the New Communist Movement."

In the Introduction, he summarizes the historical context out of which the NCM took shape:

By early 1971, public opinion polls were reporting that upwards of three million people thought a revolution was necessary in the US. Tens of thousands believed revolution was not only desirable, but possible – and maybe even not too far around the corner. Between 1968 and 1973, layer after layer of young people went in search of an ideological framework and strategy to bring that revolution about. Inspired by the dynamic liberation movements that threatened to besiege Washington with "two, three, many Vietnams", many decided that a Third World-oriented version of Marxism...was the key to building a powerful left in the US.

He notes that from 1968 through the mid-1970s, the NCM grew faster than any other segment of the US left, and was the most racially integrated. When its members looked to Third World countries for inspiration, "the Communist Party of China (CPC) was then the most ambitious in presenting its views as a rallying point for leftists worldwide. With its Cultural Revolution, China also claimed to pioneer a new, grassroots model of socialism. Largely because of this, Maoism captured the initiative within the early New Communist Movement, and Maoist tendencies were at first much better organized than...the Cuban or Vietnamese Revolutions or other variants of Third World Leninism."

After the Introduction, the book is divided into five parts:

- Part I, "A New Generation of Revolutionaries, 1968-1973", sets the context by narrating events from the politically turbulent year of 1968 which, in Elbaum's view, motivated a segment of New Left radicals to go further left.
- Part II, "Gotta Get Down to It, 1968-1973", analyzes the birth and initial stages of the NCM when it was a growing organization, reaching a peak membership of 10,000 core activists. In the "Bodies on the Line" chapter, he details the intense day-to-day life of a cadre in the movement, partly drawing on his own experiences.
- Part III, "Battered by Recession, Restructuring, and Reaction, 1974-1981", begins to chart the NCM's decline. Among the reasons Elbaum cites are (a) the rightward shift in U.S. politics due to a stagnant economy and racial backlash; and (b) Maoism's disarray after Mao's death in 1976.
- Part IV, "Walking on Broken Glass, 1982-1992", chronicles the NCM's role in building the Rainbow Coalition during Jesse Jackson's two presidential campaigns (1984 and 1988), and also tells how the collapse of communism in the Soviet Bloc had a devastating impact on the NCM.
- Part V, "End of the Long March", describes what came next in the 1990s when "the bulk of movement organizations had shriveled or disappeared." Elbaum recounts "the reentry of thousands of members of the New Communist Movement into mainstream society. Most remained progressives if not activists as they pursued their careers or raised their families."

In the last chapter and at various junctures in the book, Elbaum highlights crucial mistakes that doomed the NCM, for example:

A central problem was outright misassessment of how ripe capitalism was for defeat. This error was fundamental to the failure of the entire revolutionary left, but in the late 1960s just about everyone – including many capitalists themselves – underestimated the economic resilience of capitalism and in particular its capacity to harness the scientific and technological revolution to its advantage.

He often faults NCM members for sectarianism, "ultraleftism", and a "quest for Marxist orthodoxy", which he regards as impediments that prevented the organization from fulfilling its promise.

In addition to critiquing the movement, Elbaum also defends it, saying: "While spotlighting the New Communist Movement's fundamental errors, I take issue in this book with today's conventional wisdom that the movement – and the entire revolutionary left – was a political aberration, an almost silly or even pathological reaction to the upheavals of the sixties. On the contrary: the turn toward revolutionary politics was a completely logical response to a generation's concrete experience. The New Communist current in particular was a plausible, responsible attempt to overcome systematic injustice."

== Reception ==
Revolution in the Air was well received within socialist and Marxist circles, with Jacobin writer Ethan Young recommending the work as essential to understanding the New Communist movement. Paul Buhle called the book "the scholarship of record. An undergraduate still in 1969, Elbaum was perfectly suited for a fresh adventure. Thirty years later, he looked back carefully at the upbeat qualities of those who sought to break out of the narrow campus circles of the New Left, finding allies not only abroad (illusions about China here ended fairly early) in Third World struggles but also back at home among minorities seeking a liberation defined in 1960s terms".

In contrast, Loren Goldner of the anarcho-communist news website Libcom was far more critical:

[W]ithout exactly setting out to do so, Max Elbaum in his book Revolution In The Air, has managed to demonstrate the existence of progress in human history, namely in the decline and disappearance of the grotesque Stalinist- Maoist- "Third World Marxist" and Marxist-Leninist groups and ideologies he presents, under the rubric New Communist Movement, as the creations of pretty much the "best and the brightest" coming out of the American 1960's.

Goldner added that "'Internationalism' for Elbaum means mainly cheerleading for the latest 'Third World Marxist' movement or regime, but in reality his vision of the world is laughably America-centered." NCM veteran and former Theoretical Review contributor Paul Saba gave the book a mixed review in Viewpoint Magazine.

In her foreword to the 2018 edition, activist Alicia Garza praised Revolution in the Air for warning leftists about the dangers of sectarianism, and for emphasizing that "through the experience of making mistakes, of taking risks and having our efforts fail, that we can assess with clear eyes what went wrong, what went right, what the opposition is up to, and what to do or not to do the next time one is presented with an opportunity."
