= Leibel Bergman =

American communist activist (1915–1988)

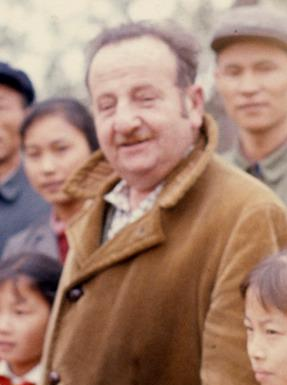
Leibel Bergman in China in the 1960s

Leibel Bergman (1915–1988) was an American communist activist. A member of the Communist Party USA (CPUSA) from the 1930s to the 1950s, he was later involved in the founding of the Maoist Bay Area Revolutionary Union and its successor organization, the Revolutionary Communist Party (RCP). Between 1965 and 1967 he lived in China, where he met and married fellow activist Vicki Garvin. After Mao's death in 1976 he left the RCP, co-founding the Revolutionary Workers Headquarters. Bergman represented a link between the prewar CPUSA and the New Communist movement of the 1970s. He was a target of FBI surveillance for decades.

== Life and career ==
Bergman was born in Grand Forks, North Dakota in 1915, into a religiously observant Jewish family. In high school he was a member of Aleph Zadik Aleph and chairman of the school debate team. He earned a degree in mathematics at the University of North Dakota, graduating at the age of 19. After college he took a job as a statistician at the North Dakota State Planning Board.

Bergman joined the CPUSA in 1937, according to his FBI file. In the late 1930s he traveled the Midwest and East Coast as a Party activist. With the outbreak of World War II he joined the US Army (consistent with the anti-fascist position of the CPUSA at the time), serving as an Army-Air Force navigator in the Pacific theater. A 1950 article in the Daily Worker noted that he was in one of the observation planes that flew over Hiroshima immediately after the first atomic bomb was dropped. During the war he married his first wife, Anne, a fellow communist. The couple had three children together. In 1951, while living in St. Paul, Minnesota, he was indicted for harboring a fugitive—Eunice Court Caldwell, wanted for perjury in connection with a loyalty board hearing in which she had denied ever being a member of the Communist Party. The Bergmans settled in San Francisco, where he worked in a drop forge factory. Continuing his activism with the CPUSA, he participated in union organizing and published a newsletter, The Scriber.

An anti-revisionist, Bergman left the CPUSA after Kruschev's speech criticizing Stalin in 1956. In 1960 he was called to testify before HUAC, where he refused to provide any information, telling the committee "I am here against my will." He was held in contempt. He was briefly a member of the Progressive Labor Party but disagreed with its strategic direction.

Bergman's wife Anne died of cancer in 1963, at the age of 47.

Inspired by the Chinese Communist Revolution, in July 1965 Bergman and his sons left the US for China, where he taught English. In China he met Vicki Garvin, who he married in 1966. He returned to the US in 1967, with Garvin following a few years later.

With a group of mostly younger activists (including Bob Avakian, H. Bruce Franklin and Steve Hamilton) Bergman founded the Maoist Bay Area Revolutionary Union (BARU) in Spring 1968. At the time, an FBI informant inside the organization described Bergman as its "dominating factor." Bergman continued to help lead the BARU as it grew into a national organization and changed its name, first to the Revolutionary Union and then (in 1975) to the Revolutionary Communist Party, USA (RCP).

After Mao's death in 1976, Bergman supported his successors, who Avakian and others in the RCP viewed as betraying Mao's legacy and moving China towards capitalism. With Mickey Jarvis, Bergman left the party to form the Revolutionary Workers Headquarters, taking about a third of the RCP's membership with them.

Bergman and Garvin eventually divorced—the date is unclear from publicly available sources.

Bergman published two books of poetry, I Cannot See Their Faces and Keep Silent (1946) and Will We Remember? (1988).

Bergman died in 1988 after a long illness.

Bergman's son Lincoln Bergman is a poet and journalist. He was poet laureate of Richmond, California. His daughter Miranda Bergman is a muralist.

== FBI surveillance and harassment ==
The FBI monitored Bergman for decades. One FBI assessment written after his return from China suggested that he had returned to act as a Chinese agent, developing a cadre of young activists to be "held in reserve for utilization by China in 20 to 30 years." During the early years of the Revolutionary Union, the Bureau used an informant to try to convince H. Bruce Franklin that Bergman himself was an FBI informant. A later FBI document described him as "a principled, dedicated Marxist-Leninist revolutionary for many, many years."

== Books ==
- I Cannot See Their Faces and Keep Silent. Saint Paul, MN: Prometheus Press, 1946.
- Will We Remember? Poems by Leibel Bergman. Chicago: Friends of Leibel Bergman, 1984.

== Sources ==
- Leonard, Aaron J. and Conor A. Gallagher. Heavy Radicals: The FBI's Secret War on America's Maoists. Zer0 books. 2014.
