= National Negro Labor Council =

The National Negro Labor Council (1950–1955) was an advocacy group dedicated to serving the needs and civil rights of black workers. Many union leaders of the CIO and AFL considered it a Communist front. In 1951 it was officially branded a communist front organization by U.S. attorney general Herbert Brownell Jr..

== History ==
=== Background ===
From the early 20th Century, the American radical movement attempted to build bridges to the African-American working class as a potentially revolutionary force — isolated from mainstream middle class life by racism, excluded for the same reason from membership in many trade unions, and consigned as a social caste to the most menial occupations at inferior wages. The forerunners of the Communist Party, USA made early connection with the African Blood Brotherhood, lending that organization financial support, and fully sponsored its successor in 1925, the American Negro Labor Congress.

During the Great Depression of the 1930s and the years of World War II, great advances were made by American organized labor in quantitative terms. From just over 3.7 million unionized workers in 1935, the ranks of organized labor swelled to 8.94 million in 1940 and approximated 15 million in 1950 — nearly a third of the entire national work force. Black workers made a significant part of this growth, thanks in measure to the more open industrial unions of the Congress of Industrial Organizations (CIO), with an estimated 1 to 1.5 million black Americans in union ranks by 1950.

During the years of World War II, black union workers joined nationally in support of the American war effort in the Negro Labor Victory Committee, founded in February 1941 under the direction of Ferdinand Smith, head of the National Maritime Union (NMU) of the CIO. This organization attempted to build a network of black union officials for joint action on behalf of the war and held mass meetings in Madison Square Garden in 1943 and 1944 to publicize black labor's support of the American government's cause.

The Negro Labor Victory Committee was disbanded at the conclusion of the war in 1945 and members of the organization were encouraged to join the Trade Union Committee of the National Negro Congress to work for the amelioration of the endemic social and economic problems facing black workers. The wartime gains of black workers were largely erased during the second half of the 1940s, with the principle of "last hired, first fired" having drastic effect with the return of millions of American men from war to the work force. African-American men, who as a group had held 15.9 percent of factory jobs in 1940, saw their share fall to just 8.5 percent in 1950. Male black employment in the professions rose from 2.8 percent in 1940 to 3.3 percent during the height of the war before falling to 2.6 in 1950 — lower than the pre-war level.

Dissatisfaction with the faltering economic situation faced by black workers and a desire for a new labor offensive on their behalf was widespread among African-American labor officialdom.

=== Preparations ===
During 1950 it was determined that a new national organization, the National Negro Labor Council (NNLC) should be established. The chief organizer of the founding convention was Ernest "Big Train" Thompson, a former foundry worker in a radiator plant in Bayonne, New Jersey, who had later become the first black organizer of the Communist-led United Electrical, Radio, and Machine Workers of America (UE), a member organization of the CIO. Thompson traveled from coast to coast visiting local labor leaders and making the case for the new organization, finding a particularly positive reception in New York City, Chicago, Cleveland, Louisville, Detroit, and San Francisco. A number of key union activists came on board with the project, including Bill Hood of the United Auto Workers (UAW) and future Detroit mayor Coleman Young of the Amalgamated Clothing Workers (ACW), both constituent unions of the CIO.

A series of meetings were held by leaders from the industrial midwest in preparation for the organization's founding, with extensive debates held over the multiple strands of difficulty faced by black workers — racial, class, and national. The relationship of the new organization to white workers was extensively discussed, and a commitment was forged to black leadership of the black workers' organization — a departure from the racial composition of the National Association for the Advancement of Colored People (NAACP), which historically featured a disproportionately large number of whites among the ranks of its top leadership.

The radical roots of the organization were apparent to conservative and anti-communist liberal labor leaders, with Walter Reuther of the UAW and James Carey of the International Union of Electrical, Radio and Machine Workers (IUE) issuing statements urging their members to boycott the new organization.

Cincinnati was chosen as the location for the group's founding convention, a provocative choice given the city's status as a Jim Crow town, in which blacks were systematically denied accommodation in white hotels, while black hotels possessed insufficient rooms to house all visiting delegates. Victoria Garvin, a vice president of the Distributive, Processing and Office Workers of America, another CIO union, spent several months arranging hotel rooms, finding housing in private homes, and negotiating with a hostile city government over the forthcoming convention, the convocation of which was publicized with 15,000 printed copies of a call sent out to union locals around the country.

=== Founding convention ===
The founding convention of the National Negro Labor Council was gaveled to order at noon on October 27, 1951, with the 1100 assembled delegates joining together to sing "The Star-Spangled Banner" and the black anthem "Lift Every Voice and Sing."

=== Development ===
By 1951, twenty three NLC chapters were established across the nation. In October of that same year, representatives from all 23 chapters met again in Cincinnati, Ohio and founded the National Negro Labor Council. In 1951 it was officially branded a communist front organization by U.S. attorney general Herbert Brownell Jr..[1]

The NNLC carried out many things such as militant strikes, campaigns to acquire more jobs for Afro-Americans, gain the right to vote or to use public facilities. The organization led job campaigns against companies such as Sears-Roebuck, Ford Motor Company, General Electric and others. But instead of focusing on the issues raised by NNLC, some union leaders of the AFL and CIO decided to attack the NNLC. As a result, it caused investigations by the McCarthyite House Un-American Activities Committee (HUAC). HUAC charged NNLC of having communist sympathies.

=== Charges before the House Un-American Activities Committee ===
Although this organization had accomplished many tasks relating to civil rights and race discrimination, it came to an end in 1956. It was called before the Subversive Activities Control Board. The organization was accused of being a Communist front organization. Defense lawyers ran up an enormous legal defense bill which the organization was not able to pay.

When the charges began to amount to an uncontrollable portion, the NNCL decided to vote. When the vote was counted, it was decided that it would dissolve itself. The legal charges were too much for the organization to handle and remain prosperous, so this decision had to be made.

== See also ==
- American Negro Labor Congress
