= Vicki Garvin =

American activist (1915–2007)

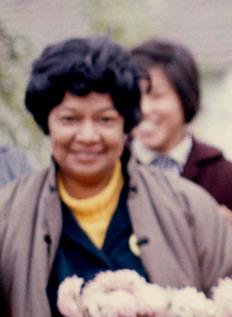
- Vicki Garvin in China in the 1960s
- Born: Victoria Holmes; December 18, 1915; Richmond, Virginia, U.S.
- Died: June 11, 2007 (aged 91)
- Spouse: Leibel Bergman (divorced)

Victoria Garvin (December 18, 1915 – June 11, 2007) was an American political activist, Pan-Africanist, and self-described working class internationalist. While growing up in a working-class family during the height of the Great Depression, Garvin was exposed early on to the realities of both proletariat and racial exploitation. Garvin became a prominent organizer in the Black Left during the height of McCarthyism, before traveling to Nigeria, Ghana, and China. In Ghana, Garvin was a member of a committee who received Malcolm X and created his itinerary, since Garvin had previously met him in Harlem. As a lifelong activist and radical intellectual, Garvin created direct links between Black Power politics, Pan-Africanism, and Third World liberation.

== Early life and education ==
Victoria Holmes was born in Richmond, Virginia on December 18, 1915. Her father, Wallace J. Holmes, worked as a plasterer and her mother was a domestic worker. The Holmes family eventually settled in Harlem in search of better job opportunities. During this time, Garvin's father was unable to find work as a plasterer, and Garvin's mother battled increasingly unfair wages and working conditions. Garvin's family often moved from apartment to apartment in order to avoid eviction. In an effort to alleviate her family's financial hardships, Garvin spent many of her summers working in the garment industry.

Garvin attended Wadleigh High School for Girls, where she founded a black history club. After graduating at the age of 16, Garvin attended Hunter College, where she received a degree in political science. In 1940, 4 years after graduating college, Garvin decided to attend Smith College to receive her master's degree. She became the first African American woman to receive a graduate degree in economics from Smith College. During her time at Smith, Garvin was heavily influenced by her studies in Marxist economics and remained heavily involved in student activism.

== Union Activism and Communist Organizing ==
Vicki Garvin was first exposed to labor union activism when she joined the National War Labor Board in 1942. As World War II came to an end, Garvin became further engaged in union work through her position as the National Research Director for a Congress of Industrial Organization (CIO) union, the United Office and Professional Workers of America (UOPWA). She joined the Harlem chapter of the Communist Party USA in 1947. During her time in the Communist Party, she often became embroiled in conflict with the racism of white Communist Party members. Around this time, she married a fellow union organizer, and although the marriage was brief, she kept her husband's last name of Garvin. During this period, Garvin first met Malcolm X, who was a bartender at the time, and she tried unsuccessfully to convince him to join the Communist Party. In the 1950s she worked as vice president of the National Negro Labor Council (NNLC) and as an executive secretary in the council's New York chapter. Garvin advocated for black women, black labor rights, and criticized the CIO's decision to disown the UOPWA for its communist politics. Due to Garvin's advocacy and outspokenness against the government's Cold War policies, anti-communist repression continued to burden Garvin's political and personal life. In 1953, she was called before the House Un-American Activities Committee. In 1955, the NNLC disbanded due to political pressure. Garvin left the Communist Party in 1957.

== Travel to Ghana, Nigeria, and China ==
In the face of McCarthyism and rising anti-communist sentiment, Garvin had limited outlets to continue union work or community-based organizing. In 1960, Garvin discovered an opportunity to work in Nigeria, which had just gained independence from the United Kingdom. While living in Lagos, Garvin experienced disillusionment with the realities of neocolonialism, which left Nigerians impoverished and divided despite their nation's independence from formal colonial rule. By 1963, Garvin had decided to leave Nigeria, and traveled to Accra, Ghana, which, under the leadership of Kwame Nkrumah, had become a hub for black activism and Pan-Africanism. Garvin was roommates with Maya Angelou and Alice Windom, and was part of a black intellectual network that included Julian Mayfield, W.E.B. and Shirley Du Bois, and Ollie Harrington. Garvin's internationalism and interest in Third World revolutions was developed during this time. When Malcolm X arrived in Ghana in 1964, Garvin, who had already met Malcolm X in Harlem, was part of a committee that shaped his experience in Ghana and accompanied him to his meetings with diplomats from Algeria, China, and Cuba.

In 1964, 2 years before the military coup that would overthrow Nkrumah, Garvin received an offer from the Chinese Ambassador to visit the People's Republic of China. After moving to China, Garvin taught English at the Shanghai Foreign Language Institute (SFLI) and was the first African American to teach at a Chinese college. She also created the university's course in African American history. In her lectures, Garvin criticized the NAACP for diluting and diverting the African American struggle and criticized Martin Luther King Jr. for what she described as an insistence that African Americans "suffer in order to defeat violence by peaceful manner." Garvin described the African American struggle as fundamentally a class struggle and stated that its correct direction was represented by advocates of armed self-defense like Robert F. Williams.

The Cultural Revolution in 1966 and the suspension of regular classroom activities ended her teaching work at SFLI. Garvin maintained close ties with the Red Guards and unlike other foreign instructors at SFLI remained in China during the Cultural Revolution. After her work at SFLI ended, Garvin taught English to workers and technicians who would be sent to African countries.

Garvin later began work as the editor of an English newspaper in Beijing, the Peking Review. After the release of Mao's 1968 statement "In Support of Afro-American Struggle Against Violent Repression," Garvin was invited back to Shanghai by her old students to give a speech at a rally. Garvin's experience speaking in front of millions of Chinese who were rallying in support of black power solidified her commitment to Third World solidarity and transnational liberation movements.

== Return to America ==
Vicki Garvin returned to the United States in 1970, relocating to Newark, New Jersey with her husband Leibel Bergman, whom she had married in China. Garvin used her skills and experience in organizing to remain heavily involved in political activism. She gave public lectures about China. She was the director of the Tri-City Citizen's Union, and shortly thereafter, worked as the Area Leader for Community Interaction at the Center for Community Health Systems of Columbia University. In 1974, after leaving her position at Columbia, Garvin became an editor for the New China, a glossy magazine published by the US China Peoples Friendship Association (USCPFA).

Garvin and Bergman relocated to Chicago in the late 1970s, where Garvin joined the Revolutionary Communist Party and served as a mentor to its inexperienced membership. In the 1980s, Garvin left Chicago in light of her divorce with Bergman and moved to Jamaica, Queens, New York, where she joined the National Black United Front (NBUF). Garvin was hailed by fellow members for her strategic thinking and negotiation of ideological differences within the group. Harnessing her decades of political experience in both communist organizing and transnational politics, Garvin played a significant role in shaping the NBUF's ideologies. Garvin was a member of the NBUF's Women Committee, which advocated for women's equality. In 1985, Garvin, along with the NBUF Women Committee, traveled to the United Nations World Conference on Women held in Kenya.

Throughout the 1980s and 1990s, Garvin remained active and supportive in groups such as the Sisters Against South African Apartheid, Black Workers for Justice, and the Black Radical Congress. She was also a participant in protests and rallies in support for perceived political prisoners, such as Mumia Abu Jamal. On June 11, 2007, Garvin died from serious illness.
