= Ad Hoc Committee for a Marxist-Leninist Party =

American "Maoist" group run by FBI

- Abbreviation: AHC
- Founded: 1962
- Dissolved: 1977
- Headquarters: Chicago, Illinois, U.S.
- Ideology: Anti-communism (de facto); Maoism (nominal)

The Ad Hoc Committee for a Marxist-Leninist Party (AHC) was an ostensibly Maoist political organization in the United States. AHC presented itself as a principled, far-left anti-revisionist communist tendency.

AHC was a front group run by the FBI's Chicago office as a counterintelligence operation under COINTELPRO. AHC provided a "radical" background for FBI informants, who joined New Communist movement organizations to spy on members, promote division and splits, and derail merger proposals. AHC newsletters sharply criticized FBI targets, such as Communist Party USA, as moderate sellouts who had abandoned real Marxism-Leninism.

== History ==
=== Origins ===
In 1962, the FBI created the Ad Hoc Committee for a Scientific Socialist Line and began publishing the Ad Hoc Bulletin (Marxist-Leninist), originally as an attempt to divide CPUSA leadership over the Sino-Soviet split. From 1962 to 1965, the AHC grew "from a notional entity into a full-fledged intelligence operation". In 1965, the operation was renamed the Ad Hoc Committee for a Marxist-Leninist Party. The AHC's leadership was anonymous.

Declassified FBI files show that the AHC was created as part of COINTELPRO covert operations by agent Herbert K. Stallings, whose "knowledge of Marxism-Leninism is broad and outstanding". The FBI described both AHC and Bulletin as "fictitious counterintelligence" organizations. After the Citizens' Commission to Investigate the FBI broke into FBI headquarters in 1971, stolen papers revealed that the AHC operation was named "ALCHEMY". Following the AHC model, the FBI established Red Star Cadre, operated by an FBI informant from 1972 to 1974, in an attempt to sow discord and prevent unification of a Marxist-Leninist organization.

Historians Aaron J. Leonard and Conor A. Gallagher describe the AHC as an initiative run entirely by the FBI and its informants, with no conventional organizational features such as an independent leadership hierarchy or stable membership structure. As a front group, AHC allowed FBI informants to establish contacts across left-wing tendencies while obscuring their FBI ties.

During the Sino-Soviet split, AHC grew from an anti-CPUSA newsletter into a method for gathering intelligence on, and influencing, factions in the New Communist movement and New Left milieu. AHC strongly encouraged breaks from the Communist Party USA and channeled militants toward anti-revisionist formations. AHC informants included some members of the leadership of both the Black Panther Party (BPP) and Students for a Democratic Society (SDS).

=== Disruption activities ===
AHC first focused its ire on the FBI's primary target, Communist Party USA, which AHC decried as moderate, "revisionist", "anti-revolutionary", and soft on imperialism. AHC wrote: "Comrades: The time has come to throw off the shackles of revisionism and return to the Revolutionary principles of Lenin, Stalin and Mao." AHC recruitment contacts described the CP as "anti-revolutionary" and "revisionist" while pushing members to defect. AHC members asked dissident CPUSA members to spy on the organization, allegedly to help build the AHC. FBI informant and senior CPUSA leadership member Morris Childs helped distribute the Ad Hoc Bulletin.

AHC published scathing articles against CPUSA in the Bulletin and circulated letters to movement newspapers, such as The Guardian. AHC built domestic and international contacts among left-wing organizations by projecting the image of a functioning militant group. Leonard argues that this publishing activity helped create the appearance of a functioning Marxist-Leninist current and provided channels for interventions into existing disputes inside the American left. For example, in 1969, AHC informants described themselves as a "Chicago Maoist group" to obtain a meeting with Weathermen leaders Bill Ayers and Jeff Jones, framed as a proposal for Chinese-backed support. The FBI also used letters received by the AHC to build up a network of Maoists to surveil, such as Revolutionary Communist Party, USA founder Robert Fitch, who saw its advertisements in The Guardian.

AHC sought to intensify factional conflict. AHC heightened intra-left debates over anti-war strategy, whether to work with Black Power movements, and whether to support Third World liberation movements. AHC frequently criticized rival party-building projects in the late 1960s and 1970s. FBI offices instructed informants, including AHC contacts, to vote with the Revolutionary Youth Movement (RYM) faction at the 1969 Students for a Democratic Society convention, in order to oppose the Progressive Labor Party (PLP). SDS fragmented into many pieces, one of which became the Weathermen.

AHC actively sought to encourage splits and discourage unifications. For example, in 1970, the FBI used the AHC's radical bona fides to insert FBI informant Don Wright into the Revolutionary Union (RU), now known as the Revolutionary Communist Party (RCP). Wright also, falsely, claimed to be a Black Panther Party member. Wright was quickly promoted within the RU, and became the RU's representative on the National Liaison Committee (NLC). The NLC had hoped to build a Maoist united front between the Revolutionary Union, the Black Workers Congress, the Puerto Rican Revolutionary Workers Organization (formerly Young Lords Party), and I Wor Kuen. Instead, Wright worked to sabotage the NLC. Wright argued that a multinational party was anti-revolutionary, as it prevented the need for independence of Third World revolutionaries. The AHC argued in The Guardian against any multinational party:

[T]he time for building a multinational party has not yet come. Since Blacks are more advanced politically than whites (as are Latins, American Indians, etc.), the amalgamation of all groups in one party would result in fragmentation, disunity and the rapid dissolution of such a party. Racism is still so strong as to separate all but the most revolutionary of comrades. [....] Blacks must work with Blacks, Latins with Latins, whites with whites.

The NLC soon collapsed.

=== Decline and legacy ===
In 1977, the FBI wound down the AHC and ALCHEMY after the Church Committee forced the FBI to reduce domestic covert operations.

AHC exemplified the FBI's strategy of using informant-driven entities to steer and monitor left-wing political milieus. ALCHEMY demonstrated that small Marxist-Leninist and Maoist organizations were readily infiltrated by FBI informants given sufficiently "radical" credentials. Historian Aaron J. Leonard argues that the AHC proved that "familiarity with Marxism" is no shield against FBI infiltration:

It used to be an article of faith on the Left that the FBI can’t bamboozle us with political line, because they wouldn’t be able to speak the language of the Left. Yeah, they totally can. The Ad Hoc Committee shows that.

== See also ==
- COINTELPRO
- New Communist movement
- Sino-Soviet split
