= Revolutionary Workers Headquarters =

- Abbreviation: RWH
- Founder: Micky Jarvis; Leibel Bergman
- Founded: 1977
- Dissolved: 1985
- Split from: RCP
- Merged into: FRSO
- Ideology: Communism; Marxism-Leninism

Revolutionary Workers Headquarters (RWH) was a U.S. Marxist-Leninist organization that formed out of a split from the Revolutionary Communist Party (RCP) in 1977. After Mao Zedong, Chairman of the Chinese Communist Party, died in 1976, the majority of the RCP's leadership criticized the post-Mao Chinese leadership as "revisionist" and "capitalist-roaders", saying that China was no longer a socialist country.

A sizable minority of the RCP (led by RCP vice chairman Micky Jarvis and founding member Leibel Bergman) believed that China was still a socialist country, and continued to support the post-Mao Chinese Communist Party under new leader Hua Guofeng. They left the RCP to form the RWH. One scholarly source estimates that 40% of the RCP's membership (over 400 people) left for the RWH. Aaron J. Leonard estimates the number at 400 or 500. In early 1979 a delegation from the RWH visited China, joined by representatives from other American Maoist groups. On their return they commented (echoing the Chinese government's position) that "China is firmly on the socialist road and dealing with its problems in a way to overcome the disastrous consequences of the Cultural Revolution.”

Aside from differences on how to assess the changes in China, the RWH also criticized the RCP for ultra-leftism, or left-idealism in their approach to political work in the U.S. After leaving the RCP, the RWH also did an extensive critique of the RCP's line on the national question, criticizing the RCP for "white chauvinism". The RWH published this critique in a lengthy 1981 pamphlet titled Build the Black Liberation Movement, which itself was subsequently criticized by Amiri Baraka of the League of Revolutionary Struggle in a pamphlet titled RWH on the BLM: Wrong Again! as having white chauvinist errors.

RWH cadre were active in various movements, including the labor movement, struggles of oppressed nationalities, the women's movement, the student movement, the struggle for divestiture from companies doing business in then-apartheid dominated South Africa, and others. In 1980 The Nation commented that the RWH "seems to be having some organizing success within rank-and-fiIe union movements" and estimated its membership at 500. Through its cadres who worked in the Revolutionary Student Brigade, the RWH was directly involved with the founding of the Progressive Student Network.

Initially, RWH activity was almost exclusively found in urban areas of the Midwest and the East; it expanded to the West Coast when it absorbed the Bay Area Communist Union in 1979.

The RWH made efforts to unite in the early 1980s with the Communist Party (Marxist-Leninist), but then the CP(M-L) dissolved. In 1985, the RWH merged with the Proletarian Unity League and the Organization for Revolutionary Unity to form the Freedom Road Socialist Organization.

While the RWH was structured according to the principles of democratic centralism, it did not consider itself a communist party per se, but rather a "pre-party organization." Like the RCP, the RWH has been categorized as a member of the New Communist movement.
