= Max Elbaum =

American author and social activist

- Born: August 21, 1947 (age 79); Milwaukee, Wisconsin, United States
- Writing career
- Notable work: Revolution in the Air
- Website: revolutionintheair.com

Max Elbaum is an American author and left-wing activist. He has written extensively about the New Left, the civil rights movement and the anti-war movement.

His book on the New Communist movement of the 1970s and 1980s, Revolution in the Air: Sixties Radicals turn to Lenin, Mao and Che, was praised by historian David Garrow as "an absolutely first-rate work of political scholarship".

He was a member of Students for a Democratic Society and later a founder of Line of March.

He is on the editorial board of Convergence Magazine. He also co-edited Power Concedes Nothing: How Grassroots Organizing Wins Elections (OR Books, 2022) with Linda Burnham and María Poblet.
