= Proletarian Unity League =

U.S. Maoist organization (1975–1985)

- Abbreviation: PUL
- Founded: 1975
- Dissolved: 1985
- Merged into: Freedom Road Socialist Organization
- Headquarters: Boston
- Ideology: Marxism-Leninism-Maoism; Anti-racism

The Proletarian Unity League was a Boston-based Maoist organization formed in 1975. Its founders were ex-Students for a Democratic Society (SDS) members who had been associated with the Revolutionary Youth Movement II: one of three factions (the others being Progressive Labor and the Weathermen) to emerge from the split in SDS that occurred at its June 1969 National Convention.

== History ==
The Proletarian Unity League (PUL) arose as part of the New Communist Movement (NCM) in the early 1970s. The PUL members rejected the Communist Party USA for its alleged revisionism; they also rejected the Socialist Workers Party and other Trotskyist sects for their opposition to Maoism and Chinese foreign policy.

In surveying the proliferation of "self-proclaimed 'communist parties'" in the U.S., the PUL criticized what it saw as a tendency toward ultra-leftism, a critique articulated in its 1977 book Two, Three, Many Parties of a New Type? Against the Ultra-Left Line. As Max Elbaum writes:

Two, Three, Many Parties went on to provide numerous examples of how sectarianism and infantile left tactics had afflicted the movement since its earliest days. Further, the book offered a comprehensive analysis of the roots of these problems in the voluntarist and semi-anarchist ideas prevalent in the late-1960s movements, and in the attraction of those ideas to the students and former students who disproportionately made up the Marxist-Leninist ranks.

Throughout its ten-year span, the PUL differentiated itself from most other Maoist organizations by:

1. Battling what it characterized as white supremacy in the American labor movement and its damaging effects on the development of class consciousness.
2. Advocating an anti-sectarian approach and arguing that there is not "one true party".
3. Supporting gays and lesbians, in contrast to the homophobia found in some NCM groups.

In February 1979, the PUL was one of six U.S. Maoist organizations to send a representative in a delegation to China. The visit's stated purpose was to "strengthen the unity between the U.S. Marxist-Leninists and the Communist Party of China" and to "promote the prospects for unity among the U.S. Marxist-Leninists." The delegation held a series of meetings with Chinese Communist Party leaders, including Vice-Premier Geng Biao.

In 1985 the PUL merged with the Revolutionary Workers Headquarters (RWH) to form the Freedom Road Socialist Organization (FRSO). The FRSO vowed to avoid the dogmatism that had been a defining feature of Maoism in the U.S. Over the next decade, several more groups joined the FRSO, which split in 1999.

== Publications ==
In addition to its Forward Motion newsletter—started in 1982 and published 4-6 times a year—the PUL's publications included:

- "It's Not the Bus! Busing and the Democratic Struggle in Boston, 1974-1975". September 1975.
- On the October League's Call for a New Communist Party – A Response. New York: United Labor Press. 1976. OCLC 80292029.
- Bring Home the Struggle against 'Left' Sectarianism: A Further Reply to the Committee of Five. New York: United Labor Press. November 1977.
- Mitchell, Roxanne; Weiss, Frank (1977). Two, Three, Many Parties of a New Type? Against the Ultra-Left Line. New York: United Labor Press. LCCN 77154452.
- "The Ultra-Left Danger and How to Fight It: Three Articles on 'Anti-Dogmatism'". January 1978.
- "On the 'Progressive Role' of the Soviet Union and Other Dogmas. A Further Reply to the PWOC and the Committee of Five". September 1978.
- "Party Building and the Main Danger: An Exchange Between the Proletarian Unity League and the Committee of Five (Detroit Marxist-Leninist Organization, El Comite-M.I.N.P., Philadelphia Workers Organizing Committee, Potomac Socialist Organization, Socialist Union of Baltimore)". 1978.
- "Kampuchea, Self-Determination, and the 'Boat People': The Challenge for Socialism" (PDF). January 1980.
- "The Left and the Challenge of the '80s" – via Bibliomania. First delivered as a speech at the National Lawyers Guild convention in Boston, August 1980.
- "Losing and Learning How to Win: Observations on the Campaign Against Proposition 2 1/2 in Massachusetts". 1980 – via Bibliomania.
- Mitchell, Roxanne; Weiss, Frank (1981). A House Divided: Labor and White Supremacy. New York: United Labor Press. OCLC 8110706. The book's back matter includes "A Comment by Harry Haywood" and the authors' response.
- A False Orthodoxy: Some Disagreements with the League of Revolutionary Struggle. New York: United Labor Press. 1981. OCLC 83718937.
- "The Proletarian Unity League: Where We Came From, What We Look Like, What We Do". January 1982.
- Dubrovsky, Ruth; Niles, Lorna (1982). Lesbian and Gay Exclusion: The Policy That Dares Not Speak Its Name. New York: United Labor Press. OCLC 47628552.
- Cummings, Susan; Hoffman, Jonathan, eds. (1982). Labor's Survival/Labor's Revival: Working Papers on the Trade Unions. New York: United Labor Press. OCLC 8762930.
- Sarkis, Charles, ed. (1982). What Went Wrong? Articles and Letters on the U.S. Communist Left in the 1970's. New York: United Labor Press. LCCN 82050349.
