= New Communist movement =

Diverse left-wing political movement in the 1970s and 1980s

The New Communist movement (NCM) was a diverse left-wing political movement during the 1970s and 1980s in the United States. The NCM were a movement of the New Left that represented a diverse grouping of Marxist–Leninists and Maoists inspired by Cuban, Chinese, and Vietnamese revolutions. This movement emphasized opposition to racism and sexism, solidarity with oppressed peoples of the third-world, and the establishment of socialism by popular revolution. The movement, according to historian and NCM activist Max Elbaum, had an estimated 10,000 cadre members at its peak influence.

== History ==
=== Origins ===
Until the 1960s the largest and most influential organization to the left of the Democratic Party within the United States was the Communist Party, USA (CPUSA), which achieved peak influence during the Great Depression and World War II, before declining in the post war years due to a number of factors, including state-repression (e.g., McCarthyism, the Smith Act, the Rosenberg Trial, etc.), as well as internal ideological schisms within the party. Members were often disillusioned by the party-leadership's official subordination to the USSR ideologically, with the party defending the numerous controversial actions by the Soviet state.

This would be a key moment in the Marxist movement in the United States and the world, with numerous ranking party members leaving the organization due to Krushchev's perceived revisionism in pursuing the policy of peaceful coexistence with the Capitalist West, which was perceived as a fundamental departure from the revolutionary socialism and anti-imperialist elements of Marxism–Leninism. The New Communist Movement was influenced by world events of the time, specifically the Cuban Revolution of 1959, the Chinese Cultural Revolution, The French May-Day Uprising, and the Black Power Movement. Many of the early participants in the NCM were former members of the New Left student organization Students for a Democratic Society. The NCM emerged from numerous distinct movements in the United States during the late 1960s, with historian Max Elbaum, identifying Black Panther Party, Students for a Democratic Society, and the Progressive Labor Party.

=== Revolutionary Union / Revolutionary Communist Party ===
One of the most prominent groups of the New Communist Movement was the Bay Area Revolutionary Union (later, shortened to Revolutionary Union), formed by activists led by Bob Avakian which gained most of its membership from the Students for a Democratic Society. Its anti-revisionist line emphasized the Black liberation struggle and the liberation of colonized peoples within and outside the United States. They became active in the Vietnam Veterans Against the War after it opened its membership to non-veterans and temporarily gained control when the national office voted to expel non RU chapters and members and voted to integrate into the Revolutionary Union although non Marxist members of the VVAW filed and won a lawsuit prohibiting the RU dominated group from using the VVAW name, logos and materials. Deep animosity still exists between the two organizations. In September 1975 the RU officially voted to dissolve and reestablish itself into the Revolutionary Communist Party, USA.

=== October League ===
The Communist Party (Marxist–Leninist)'s predecessor organization, the October League (Marxist–Leninist), was founded in 1971 by several local groups, many of which had grown out of the radical student organization Students for a Democratic Society when SDS split apart in 1969. Michael Klonsky, who had been a national leader in SDS in the late 1960s, was the main leader of the CP(M-L).

The October League came out of the Revolutionary Youth Movement II grouping in the SDS split. During the early 1970s the OL took positions that were at odds with most of the US Left, including opposition to gay liberation and support of the Shah of Iran, whose regime they saw as a bulwark against Soviet social-imperialism.

The OL established influence within some of the established civil rights organizations, including the Southern Christian Leadership Conference and the Southern Conference Educational Fund, which had been under the influence of the Moscow-oriented Communist Party USA.

In late 1975 they organized a "National Fight Back Conference," which drew 1,000 participants and was attended by representatives of the August 29th Movement, the Congress of Afrikan People and the Marxist–Leninist Organizing Committee of San Francisco. They also had a youth group called the Communist Youth Organization.

=== Greensboro massacre ===
On November 3, 1979, four members of the Communist Workers' Party (CWP) and a male protester were killed by members of the Ku Klux Klan and the American Nazi Party (ANP) during a Death to the Klan march, organized by the CWP. The event had been preceded by inflammatory rhetoric from both sides. The CWP had originally come to Greensboro to support workers' rights activism among mostly black textile industry workers in the area. The march was a part of that larger effort. The Greensboro city police department had an informant within the KKK and ANP group who notified them that the Klan was prepared for armed violence.

=== 1970s and 1980s ===
As one of its last initiatives, SDS had begun to leave its campus base and organize in working-class neighborhoods. Radical militant groups such as Weather Underground are recognized as participants in the movement. Some former members subsequently developed local organizations that continued the trend, and they attempted to find theoretical backing for their work in the writings of Vladimir Lenin, Mao Zedong and Joseph Stalin. Maoism was then highly regarded as more actively revolutionary than the brand of communism supported by the post-Stalin Soviet Union (see New Left: New Left in the United States). As a result, most NCM organizations referred to their ideology as Marxism–Leninism-Mao Zedong Thought and rejected what they saw as the devolution of socialism in the contemporary Soviet Union.

Similar to the New Left's general direction in the late 1960s, these new organizations rejected the post-1956 Communist Party USA as revisionist, or anti-revolutionary, and also rejected Trotskyism and the Socialist Workers Party for its theoretical opposition to Maoism.

The groups, formed of ex-students, attempted to establish links with the working class through finding work in factories and heavy industry, but they also tended toward Third-worldism, supporting National Liberation Fronts of various kinds, including the Black Panther Party (then on the decline), the Cuban Revolution, and the National Front for the Liberation of Vietnam. The New Communist Movement organizations supported national self-determination for most ethnic groups, especially blacks and those of Latino origin, in the United States. These organizations addressed problems of sexism and racism, partly by voicing adamant support for self-determination and identity politics, and felt that they were dealing with problems they were of the opinion had not been addressed in the groups of the 1960s. However, different NCM groups came to this similar conclusion via quite different routes.

In its early years, NCM organisations formed a loose-knit tendency in United States leftist politics, but never coalesced into a single organization. As time went on, the organizations became extremely competitive and increasingly denounced one another. Points of distinction were frequently founded on the attitude taken toward the successors of Mao and international disputes between the Soviet Union and China regarding such developments as the Angolan Civil War. The Revolutionary Union organized the founding congress of the Revolutionary Communist Party, USA in 1975.

The October League organized the founding congress of the Communist Party (Marxist–Leninist) in 1977. During this period a few other new communist movement organizations also formed new communist parties.

Unlike the majority of NCM groups, the Dodge Revolutionary Union Movement (DRUM), which evolved into the League of Revolutionary Black Workers (LRBW), was formed by factory workers rather than student activists. The AFL–CIO leadership supported the Vietnam War and sought to avoid strikes, but union workers saw through this and independently organized a series of wildcat strikes. Radical Marxist and other African-American auto workers subsequently formed DRUM. From 1968 to 1971 DRUM and the league acted as a dual union, with black leadership, within the United Auto Workers. In the late 1970s a group labeled the May 19th Communist Organization was created, going on a bombing campaign.

In 1979, after the publishing of Enver Hoxha's Imperialism and the Revolution and other criticisms of Maoism from Albania, some groups renounced Maoism in favour of an "orthodox Marxist–Leninist" line similar to that of the Albanian communists. Many of these groups such as the Marxist–Leninist Organizing Committee and Sunrise Collective formed together in a joint statement against the end of Chinese aid to Albania. The U.S. Marxist–Leninist Party, previously the Central Organization of U.S. Marxist-Leninists, would become the primary recognized vanguard party in the United States supported by Albania, although Albanian aid to the American communists was minimal due to fears of CIA infiltration. Other groups such as the Red Dawn Organization and Pacific Collective (Marxist–Leninist) would meet with similarly pro-Albania groups in the 1979 in an attempt to unite and form a single communist party.

== Legacy ==
The New Communist Movement as a whole became smaller in the 1980s. The militant May 19th Communist Organization was dissolved. Some organizations dissolved in the early 1980s, such as the Communist Party (Marxist–Leninist). The Revolutionary Communist Party USA remains as an original product of the New Left. The Revolutionary Workers Headquarters and Proletarian Unity League joined forces to form the Freedom Road Socialist Organization in 1985, and various other new communist movement collectives and organizations later merged into FRSO. Subsequently, in 1999, FRSO split into two organizations, both of which until 2019 continued to use the name Freedom Road Socialist Organization.

=== Homophobia ===
The groups and individuals representing the movement were persistently hostile towards homosexuality and homosexuals, reflecting both the homophobia within the United States, as well as homophobic tendencies within the larger international Marxist–Leninist movement, although gay rights activism was an early component of the New Left. A 1974 Revolutionary Union position paper concluded that "homosexuality is based on petty bourgeois ideology and deals with the contradiction between men and women by turning its back to it." By the 2010s, the RU's successor organization, the Revolutionary Communist Party, demanded full recognition of LGBT rights as a fundamental element of establishing socialism.

== Influences ==
- Frantz Fanon, anti-colonialist writer and existentialist philosopher
- Mao Zedong, military leader of the Chinese Communist Revolution, General Secretary of the CCP
- Huey Newton, leader and co-founder of the Black Panther Party, deeply influenced by Maoism and Black Nationalism
- Amílcar Cabral
- Kwame Nkrumah
- Stokely Carmichael
- Fidel Castro, leader of the July 26th Movement and the Cuban Revolution
- Harry Haywood, CPUSA member, anti-racist activist, anti-revisionist
- William Z. Foster, anti-revisionist leader of the CPUSA
- Bobby Seale, co-founder of the Black Panther Party
- Vladimir Lenin, leader of the Bolshevik Party during the October Revolution
- Joseph Stalin, leader of the Soviet Union during WWII and beyond
- Ho Chi Minh, leader of the Vietnamese revolution and the Democratic Republic of Vietnam
- Ernesto "Che" Guevara, prominent member of the 26 July Movement
- Thomas Sankara, Marxist-Leninist, Panafricanist, leader of Burkina Faso
- Elaine Brown, leader of the Oakland Black Panther Party
- Malcolm X
- Enver Hoxha, First Secretary of the Party of Labour of Albania, leader of communist Albania.

== Organizations ==
=== Predecessors ===
- Ad Hoc Committee for a Marxist-Leninist Party, a FBI front group
- Provisional Organizing Committee for a Communist Party
- Bay Area Revolutionary Union
- Black Panther Party
- Dodge Revolutionary Union Movement
- Revolutionary Youth Movement II
- Students for a Democratic Society
- Young Pioneers of America
- Communist Party, USA
- Progressive Labor Party
- Peace and Freedom Party

=== Organizations of the 1970s and 1980s ===
- Committee for a Proletarian Party
- Communist Organization, Bay Area
- Communist Labor Party of North America
- Communist Party (Marxist–Leninist)
- Communist Workers Party
- Georgia Communist League
- League of Revolutionary Struggle
- Marxist-Leninist Party, USA
- May 19th Communist Organization
- National Guardian
- National Labor Federation
- October League
- Organization for Revolutionary Unity
- Proletarian Unity League
- Puerto Rican Revolutionary Workers Organization
- Revolutionary Communist Party, USA
- Revolutionary Union
- Revolutionary Workers Headquarters
- Revolutionary Workers Organization
- Sojourner Truth Organization
- Venceremos Organization

=== Current descended organizations ===
- Freedom Road Socialist Organization
- Revolutionary Communist Party, USA
- Progressive Labor Party

== Prominent figures ==
=== Revolutionary Union / Revolutionary Communist Party (1968–present) ===
- Steve Hamilton
- Bob Avakian, present Chairman
- Leibel Bergman
- H. Bruce Franklin

=== Communist Workers Party ===
- Michael Nathan
- James Michael Waller

=== October League ===
- Lynn Wells

=== Others ===
- General Baker
- Irwin Silber, editor of The Guardian
- Marian Kramer
- Lynn Wells
- Max Elbaum

== See also ==
- Black Power movement
- Communism in the United States
- K-Groups (Germany)
- Autonomism
- Workerism
- Proletarian Democracy
- New Left in Japan
