= Revolutionary Union =

Revolutionary Union may refer to:

- Anarcho-syndicalism, also known as "revolutionary unionism"
- National Leftist Revolutionary Union (UNIR), a democratic socialist organization in Colombia
- Dodge Revolutionary Union Movement (DRUM), a New Communist labor union for the Dodge Main factory
- Popular Socialist Party (Cuba), a communist party in Cuba, which merged with the Communist Revolutionary Union
- Revolutionary Communist Party, USA (RCP), a New Communist organization created as the Bay Area Revolutionary Union (BARU)
- Revolutionary Union (Peru), a fascist organization in Peru
- Revolutionary Union for Internationalist Solidarity (RUIS), a Greek anarchist militant organization in Kurdistan
- Revolutionary Union of Kurdistan, which can refer to two Kurdish groups: Kurdistan Freedom Party in Iran, Revolutionary Party of Kurdistan in Turkey
- Revolutionary United Front, a militant organization in Sierra Leone
- Revolutionary Youth Union, the youth organization of the Arab Socialist Ba'ath Party – Syria Region
- Workers' Socialist Federation, a left communist organization in Great Britain which emerged from the All-Workers Revolutionary Union
