= DisruptJ20 =

Protest group in the US

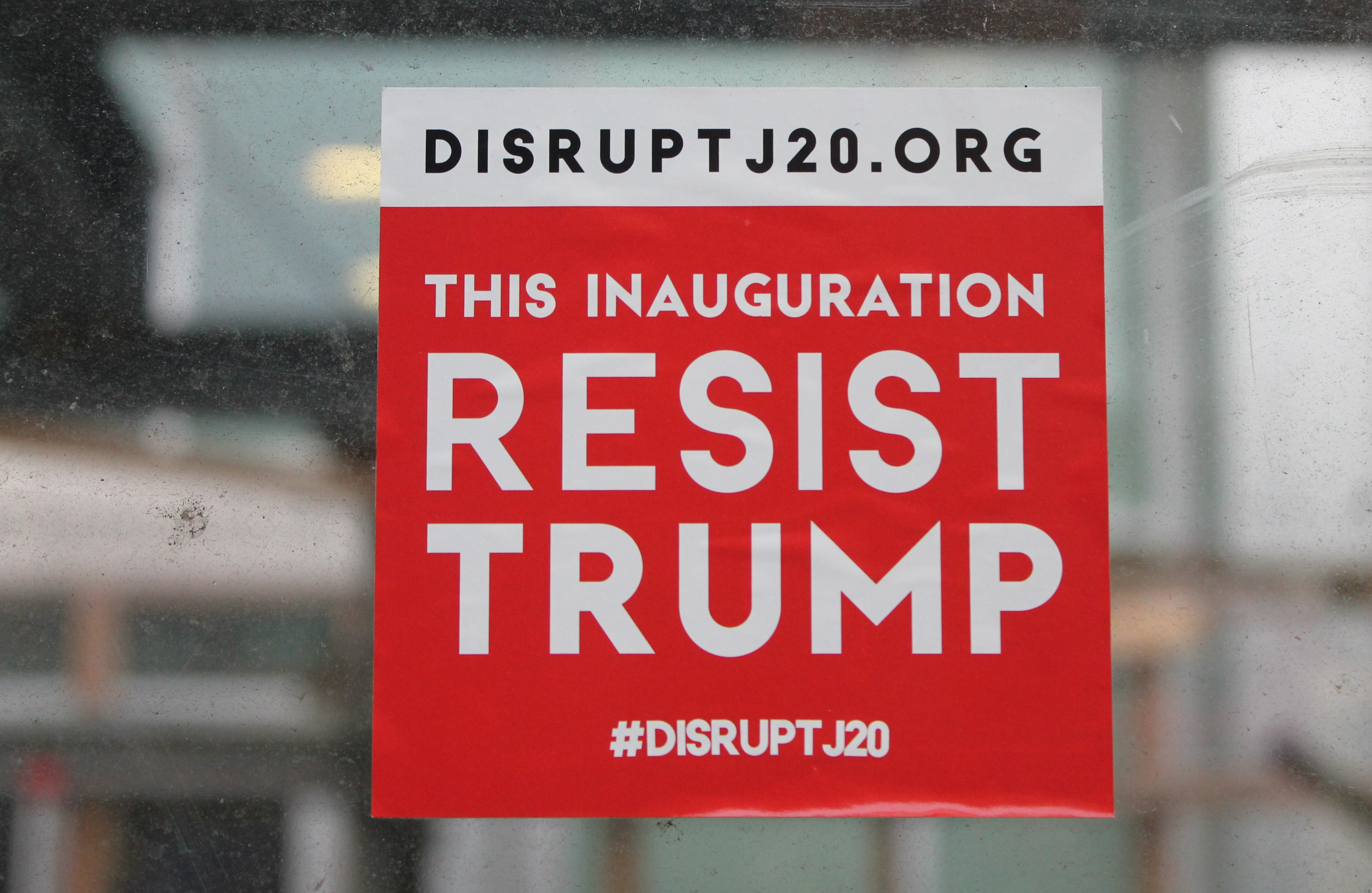
- DisruptJ20 poster
- Purpose: Disrupting the Inauguration of Donald Trump; Protesting the Presidency of Donald Trump
- Website: www.disruptj20.org

DisruptJ20 (also Disrupt J20) was an organization that protested and attempted to disrupt events of the presidential inauguration of the 45th U.S. President, Donald Trump, which occurred on January 20, 2017. The group was founded in July 2016 and publicly launched on November 11, 2016, shortly after Trump's election victory DisruptJ20's inauguration protests were a part of a wider array of protests organized both locally and nationally from a more extensive initial plan. The protests included efforts to blockade one bridge and to shut down security checkpoints. Over 200 people were arrested en masse, but all charges were later dropped.

== Description ==
A Washington, D.C.-based political organization, DisruptJ20 (also appearing with an inserted space before "J20") had the initial stated aim of protesting and disrupting events of the inauguration of Donald Trump as 45th President of The United States. One organizer of the DisruptJ20 protests, Alli McCracken, stated that the group is protesting Trump's views on women, undocumented immigrants and Muslims. Al Jazeera described the members of the organization as "liberal activists". Steven Nelson of the U.S. News & World Report, after interviews with organizers and representatives, described it in December 2016 as the "more radical protest-organizing network DisruptJ20, which has more than 1,700 Facebook group members." A representative of the organization has stated that it would also have demonstrated had Hillary Clinton won the 2016 presidential election.

== History and protest planning ==
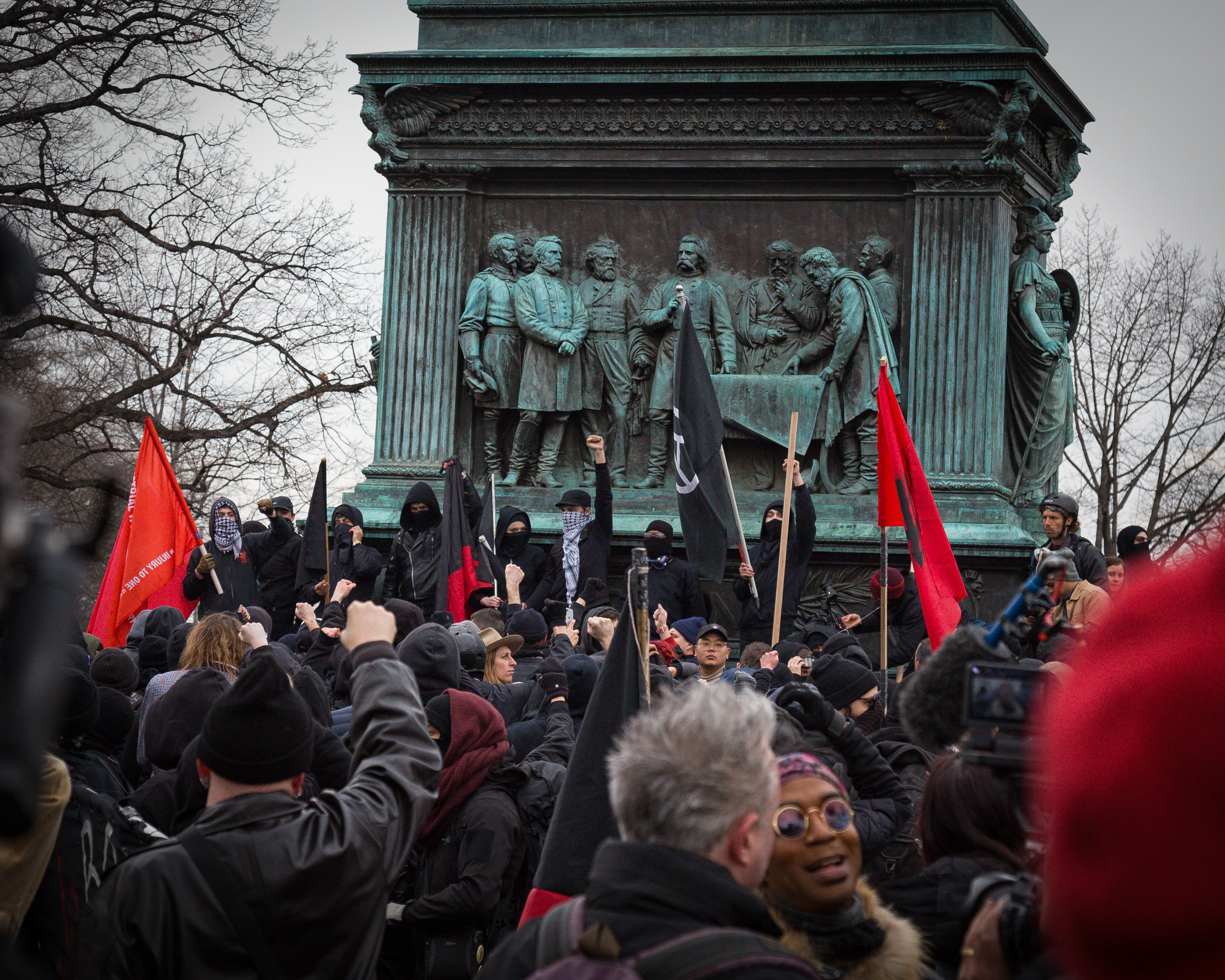
Black bloc anarchist protest in Washington D.C on the Equestrian statue of John A. Logan during the J20 protests

DisruptJ20 was founded around July 2016, about six months before Trump's inauguration. "J20" was chosen to stand for January 20, the scheduled day of the 2017 inauguration. DisruptJ20 was publicly launched on November 11, 2016, with a YouTube video and social media accounts. It and its aims were described in an interview with Legba Carrefour, "an organizer with DisruptJ20", as

an umbrella coalition of groups with a core of local organizers who have a lot of activist experience. Washington, D.C. organizers ... most of whom are anarchists. ... The idea ... is we want to undermine Trump's presidency from the get-go. There has been a lot of talk of peaceful transition of power as being a core element in a democracy and we want to reject that entirely and really undermine the peaceful transition.

According to Nelson of the U.S. News & World Report, the DisruptJ20s website in December 2016 associated the organisation with the "DC Welcoming Committee [DCWC] collective" (describing it as "being assisted by" the DCWC) and Nelson reports that DisruptJ20, at this time, involved individuals from an array of progressive groups (as individuals, rather than representing their groups). Nelson quotes Carrefour, who he describes as "a local anarchist handling press" for DisruptJ20, as indicating that "more than 200 people attended an organizing meeting at a local church ... on short notice" and that photographs "show[ed] supporters representing a range of ages and interests." Regarding intent, Carrefour stated to Nelson,

We are planning to shut down the inauguration, that's the short of it ... We're pretty literal about that, we are trying to create citywide paralysis on a level that I don't think has been seen in D.C. before. We're trying to shut down pretty much every ingress into the city as well as every checkpoint around the actual inauguration parade route.

On January 14, 2017, about a hundred demonstrators met at the American University to plan and prepare their protests. Carrefour described their plans for inauguration week, beginning the weekend of January 14–15, 2017 ("MLK weekend"), indicating that DisruptJ20 was:

- holding "an Action Camp ... doing a lot of non-violent direct action trainings" on that weekend;
- sponsoring a "queer dance party" at the residence of Vice President Mike Pence, on Wednesday, January 18;
- arranging an "action" for the DeploraBall—described as an "Alt-Right Trump inaugural ball"—on Thursday, January 19, with the aim of "trying to shut that down";
- having, on the 20th, inauguration day, "blockades ... at all the checkpoints around the inauguration parade route and to get into the viewing area ... transit blockades all day ... several unpermitted marches, an especially big one at Logan Circle" at 10 A.M., and a permitted march at 12 P.M., as well as events going on throughout inauguration evening."

After the January 14 meetings, James O'Keefe of Project Veritas posted a video shot at pizzeria Comet Ping Pong in the capital showing members of the DC Antifascist Coalition planning to disrupt the DeploraBall at the National Press Building on January 19—through use of stink bombs (of butyric acid) and activation of the building's sprinkler system. DisruptJ20 countered that it had caught on to the Veritas operation and had thus fed its operative a false plot;. Based on the video, the DC police arrested a man on January 19, 2017 for his alleged planning to disrupt the DeploraBall. Veritas released a second part to the video showing DisruptJ20 participants discussing their plans to blockade trains.

DisruptJ20 separately announced that the group would scale back on their blockade efforts, and only shut down one bridge.

== Inauguration actions, eve and day ==
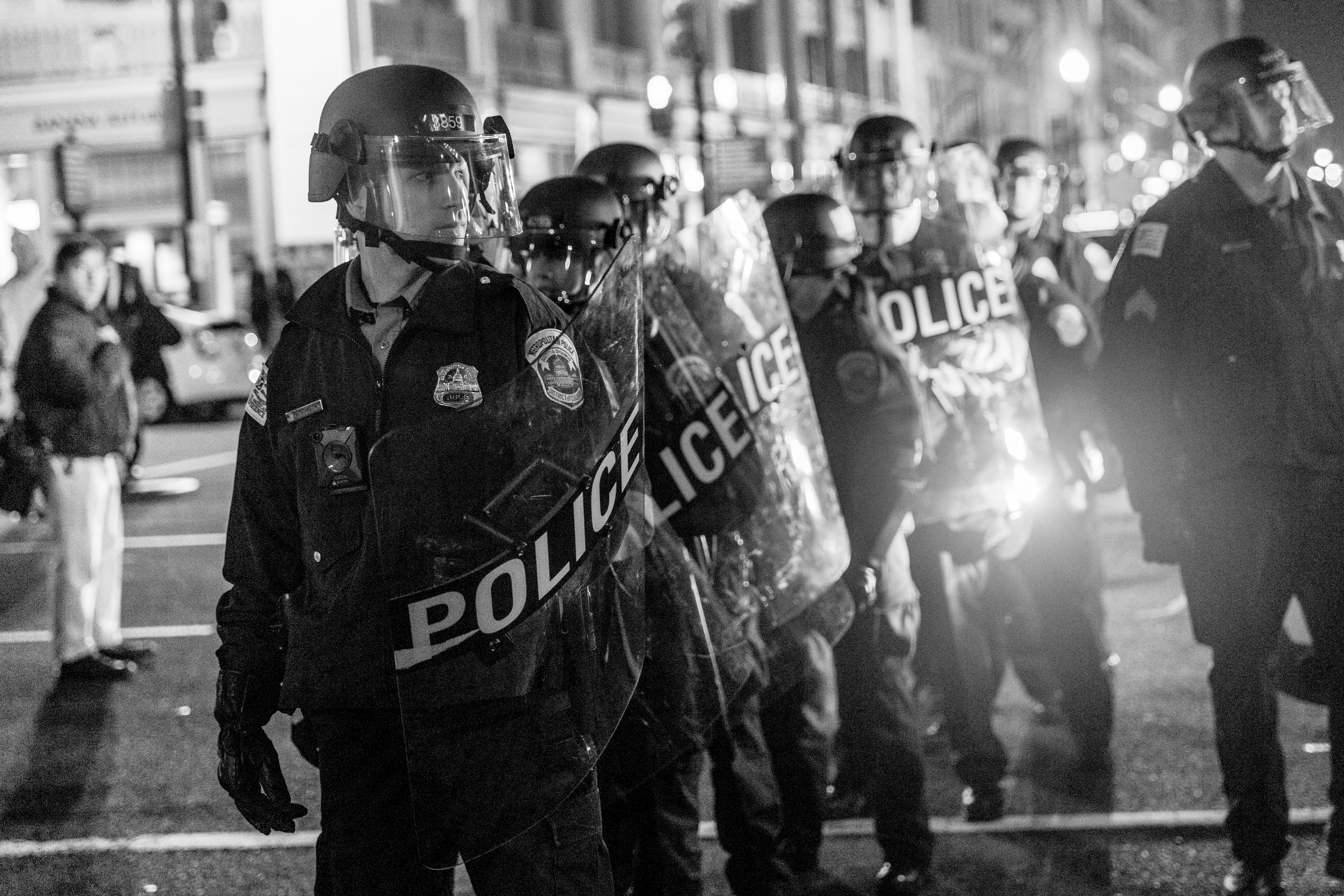
Police presence the day of January 19, outside the National Press Building (NPB), 529 14th Street NW.

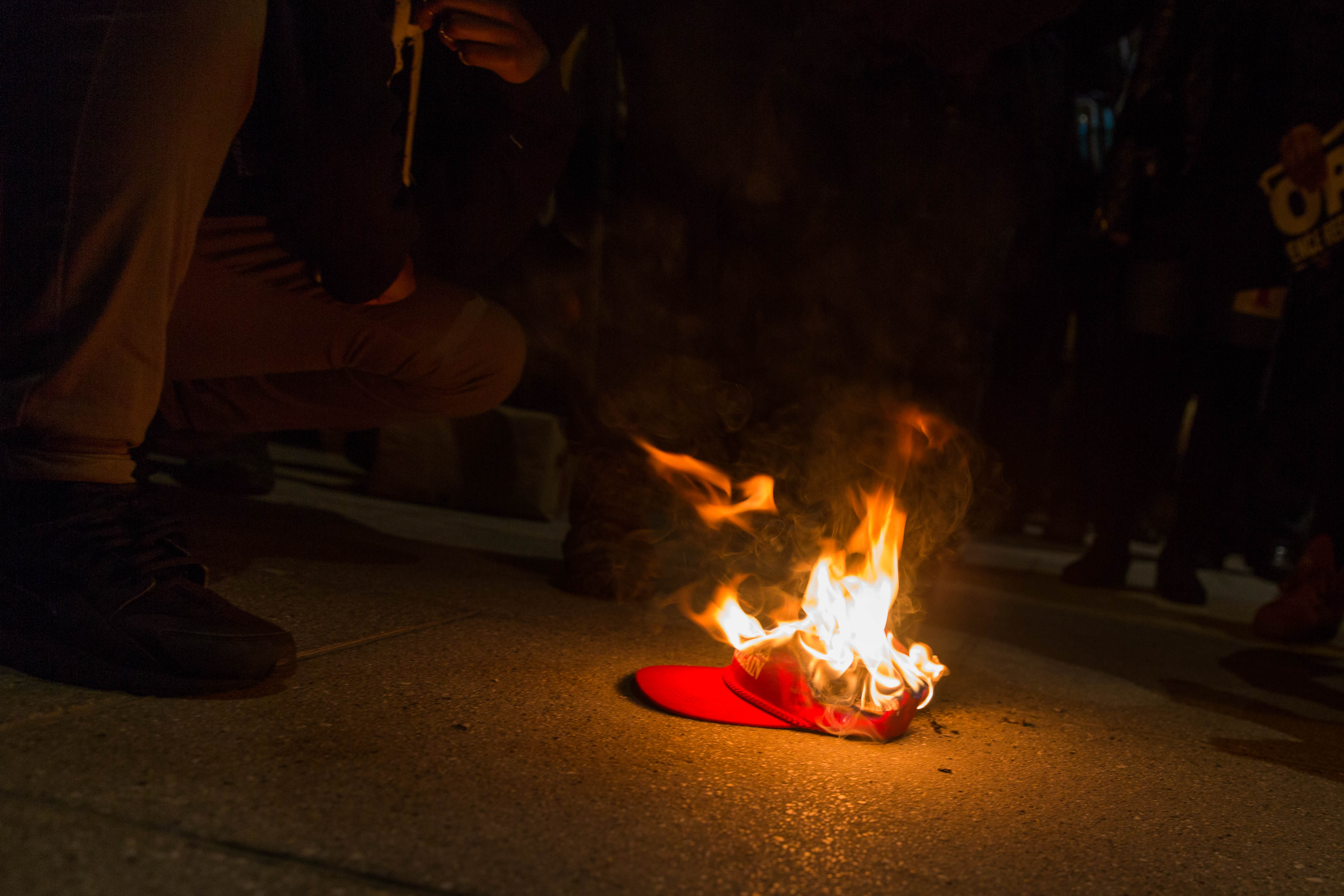
Burning of Make America Great Again campaign hat after sunset January 19, outside the NPB

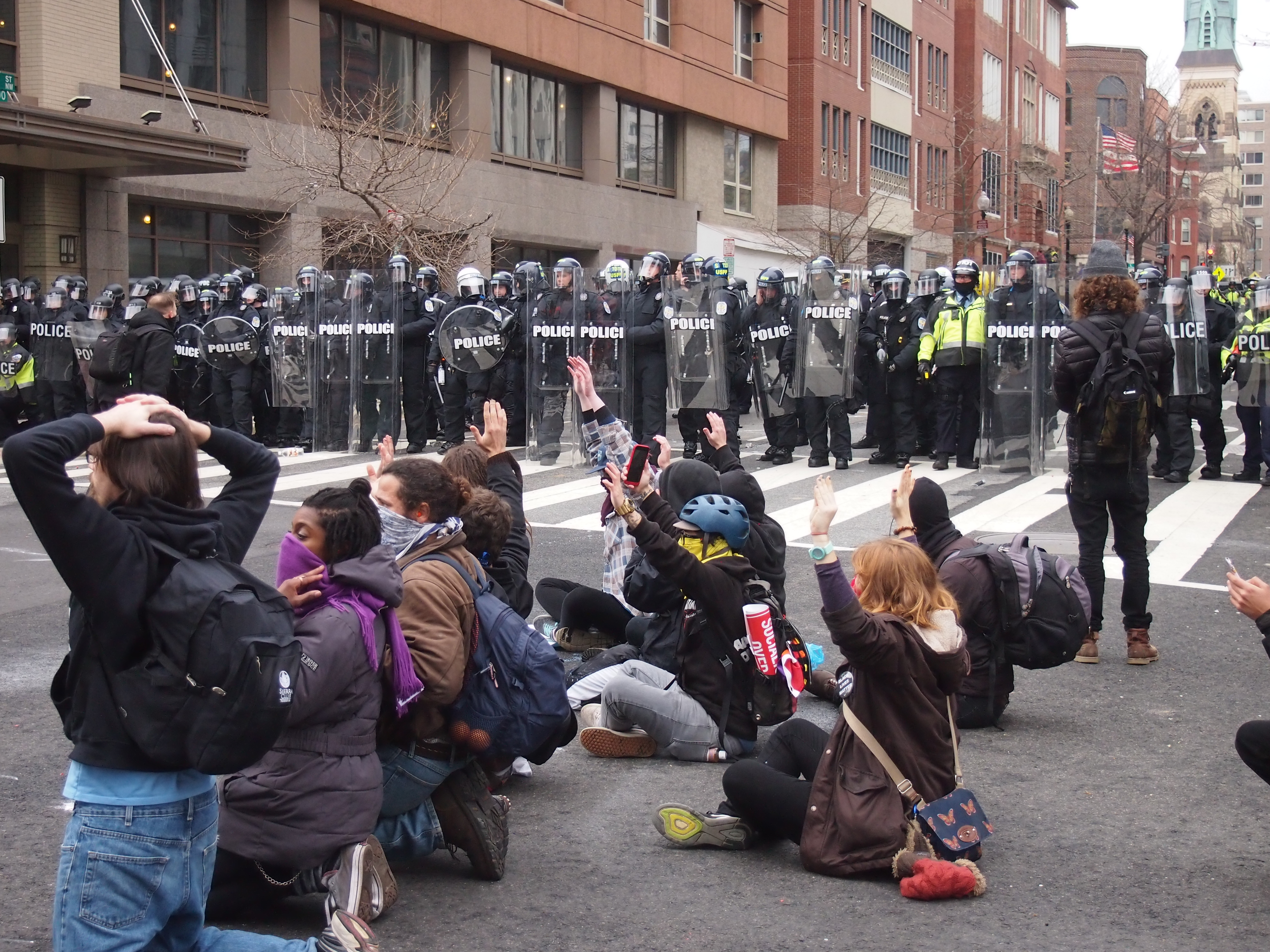
Sit-in protest on January 20, attempting to block police line at the intersection of 12th and K Streets NW, in Washington, D.C.

Gallery of photographs, DisruptJ20-associated protest events, presidential inauguration, 45th U.S. President, Donald Trump, January 19–20, 2017

DisruptJ20's efforts in Washington, D.C., were a part of a wider array of nationwide protests, that included nationwide rallies such as Our First Stand: Save Our Health Care (organized by congressional Democrats and health care activists) and Poets Protest Against Trump (by such artists, on local city hall steps), both the weekend before the inauguration; the celebrity Love-a-thon (a Facebook-broadcast fund-raiser for liberal causes, featuring a number of film actors) on inauguration day, and the Women's March on Washington, D.C., and hundreds of sister marches nationwide, the day following the inauguration.

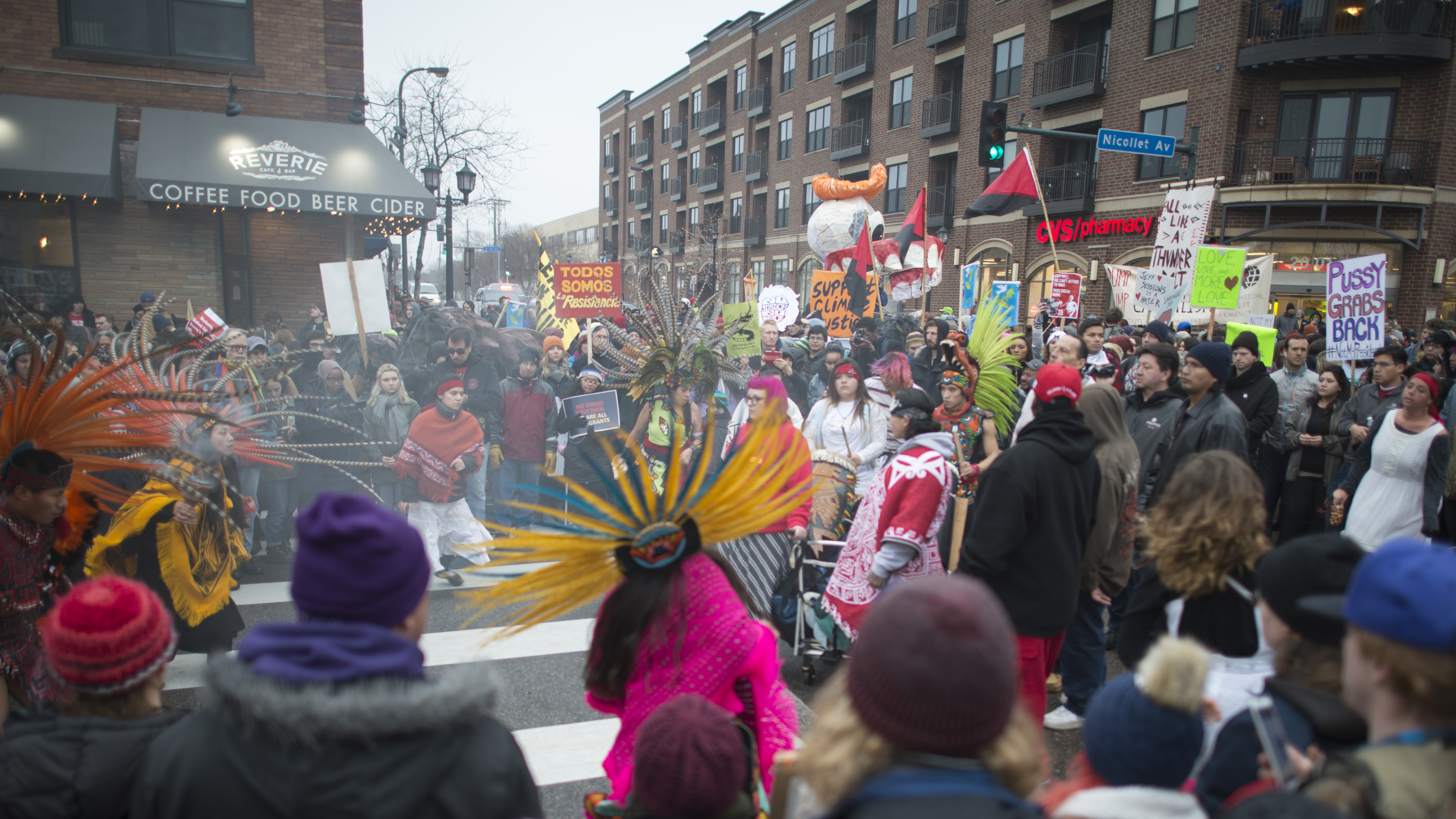
Anarchist and Indigenous protesters in Minneapolis during DisruptJ20 2017

The DisruptJ20 protests were specific actions, organized in Washington, D.C., and Baltimore, Maryland in particular. A number of their protest activities occurred throughout Washington on January 19–20, 2017. Protests involving DisruptJ20 members from a variety of groups occurred at the National Press Building during the day and into the evening, on the January 19. On January 20, DisruptJ20 participants linked arms at security checkpoints, attempting to shut down flow into the inauguration through these checkpoints. A post-event press release from DisuruptJ20, reported on by The Washington Post, state that "climate justice activists" numbering ca. 400 participated in physically blocking the inauguration security checkpoints, including a four-hour block of the checkpoint at 3rd and D Streets NW. The statement indicated, "[our] work is done."

== Broad responses to the effort ==
Comments both supportive and judgmental have appeared around the DisruptJ20 inauguration activities. Activist filmmaker Michael Moore indicated support for their efforts in the two cities, via Twitter.

Publications ranged in opinion from support to criticism. The presentation from The Huffington Post took the form of an information article directing interested readers to the DisruptJ20 web page, and to various protests in which they could participate.

== Legal proceedings ==
In February 2017, the organization announced fundraising and legal support for individuals arrested for January 20 activities.

Those arrested on Inauguration Day were charged with rioting, and were released pending a court date. A class action lawsuit was filed for false arrest, and excessive force. On April 3, 2017, the Metropolitan Police Department raided the house of a DisruptJ20 activist as part of its "investigation into the conspiracy to riot."

On 17 July 2017, the US Department of Justice served DreamHost, the company hosting the DisruptJ20 website, with a search warrant for all information held about the site. The information requested in the warrant included the IP addresses of 1.3 million people who visited the site, as well as the date and time of their visit and information about the browser and operating system. In addition to this, the contact information, email content and photos of thousands of people was requested. DreamHost challenged the warrant in court, arguing that it was a "highly untargeted demand" that chilled its users' constitutional rights. The Electronic Frontier Foundation also called the warrant an unconstitutional fishing expedition. On October 10, 2017, Chief Judge Robert Morin of the Superior Court of the District of Columbia issued an order significantly narrowing the warrant's scope. "[W]hile the government has the right to execute its Warrant," he wrote, "it does not have the right to rummage through the information contained on DreamHost's website and discover the identity of, or access communications by, individuals not participating in alleged criminal activity, particularly those persons who were engaging in protected First Amendment activities."

In late November 2017, six people charged with rioting went on trial. Prosecutors alleged that these six people were taking part in DisruptJ20 protests and vandalism. A jury trial found the six defendants not guilty on all counts in December 2017. On January 18, 2018, the U.S. Justice Department dropped charges against 129 people, leaving 59 defendants to face charges related to the DisruptJ20 protest. By early July 2018, federal prosecutors had dropped all charges against all defendants in the case.

The prosecution of the case, led by Jennifer Kerkhoff Muyskens, was found to have engaged in Brady violations—deliberately obfuscating exculpatory video evidence that supported the defendants' case—in direct cooperation with the Metropolitan Police detective and DC Police Union president, Gregory Pemberton. This led to Muyskens' removal from all pending prosecutions in which she was involved in 2024 and the eventual loss of her license to practice law in 2025.

In 2021, the ACLU of the District of Columbia, and the District of Columbia settled a false arrest lawsuit, where the District agreed to pay $1.6 million.

== See also ==
- Inauguration of Donald Trump protests
- Protests against Donald Trump
- Washington A16, 2000
- January 20, 2005 counter-inaugural protest against the second presidential inauguration of George W. Bush
- 2021 United States Capitol attack
