= 1972 Mead wildcat strike =

1972 labor strike in Georgia, US

- Strikers chanting "Soul power, workers' power"
- Date: August 18 – October 5, 1972
- Location: Atlanta, Georgia, US
- Caused by: Discrimination; poor working conditions
- Goals: End discrimination; better wages and working conditions; worker autonomy
- Methods: Picketing; Strike action; Traffic obstruction; Boycott
- Result: Settlement with agreement to address safety and discrimination

Parties
Mead Rank and File Workers' Caucus; October League; Southern Christian Leadership Conference	Mead Corporation; Local 527; Atlanta Police

Lead figures
Sherman Miller; Hosea Williams	

Casualties
- Injuries: One black worker possibly blinded
- Arrested: 66–100 picketers

In 1972, a collective of predominantly black workers at the Mead Corporation packaging plant in Atlanta, Georgia, United States, waged a seven-week wildcat strike over racism, sexism, and unsafe working conditions. The striking workers claimed victory after Mead agreed to a settlement and conceded to some worker demands for better workplace safety and an end to discrimination at the plant.

Originally, the black workers at the Mead plant had appealed to the Local 527 union for support. When that did not work, the workers began to organize with members from the local chapter of the October League and ultimately formed their own workers' collective: the Mead Rank and File Workers' Caucus. Led by a young black communist named Sherman Miller, the Caucus drafted a 50 point "Black Workers Manifesto" detailing their demands to improve the working conditions at the Mead plant. Their demands included a wage increase, sick pay, better safety equipment, and more worker-led oversight into plant policies. Mead management dismissed the Caucus's demands, claiming that they were only allowed to negotiate with the official Local 527 union, so the Caucus declared a wildcat strike.

The striking workers partnered with the Atlanta chapter of the Southern Christian Leadership Conference (SCLC) and its president, the Reverend Hosea Williams. Throughout the course of the strike, workers picketed and demonstrated outside the plant, in direct defiance of several injunctions against them that were meant to limit their ability to picket. The SCLC led marches to the plant, and many activists were arrested and brutalized by police. Opponents of the strike also tried to unsuccessfully "red-bait" the communist strike leaders; however, despite a public split between the October League and SCLC, the workers themselves remained united. On October 5, Mead and the Caucus reached a settlement; the company agreed to make safety improvements and address discrimination at the plant.

== Background ==
The Mead plant in Atlanta manufactured food packaging and employed around 1,200 workers, most of whom were black. Of those black workers, about one-third were women. At the Mead plant, black workers were assigned to work in the most dangerous areas; a worker described one area containing a large vat of acid, in which two men had previously fallen in and died. Black women reported being threatened with violence by white coworkers, and they were forced to work overtime in extreme heat, causing them to faint from exhaustion. Wages were also low, and workers had to hold multiple jobs to support their families.

The plant had an official union called Printing Specialties and Paper Products Union Local 527; it was an AFL-CIO affiliate. The stewards of the Local 527 union were mostly white, and the union ignored the concerns raised by black workers. Workers accused it of being a "sweet heart union" that represented Mead's interests rather than the workers'. Later, the Reverend Hosea Williams, an Atlanta-area civil rights leader, said that Local 527 "sold out" and "had an unholy union with management".

A Marxist–Leninist group called the October League, which already had some members working at the plant, stepped in to hear the workers' grievances. Led by a young black communist named Sherman Miller, the black workers and members of the League began to organize in August 1972. It was then that they formed their own collective, separate from the union: the Mead Rank and File Workers' Caucus. (Note: Also shortened to "Rank and File Caucus") The workers also sought support from the Southern Christian Leadership Conference (SCLC) and Williams, who was the president of the DeKalb SCLC.

== Wildcat strike ==
The Rank and File Caucus, joined by most of the black workers at the plant, declared a wildcat strike on Friday, August 18 and staged a walkout. Workers formed a picket line and blocked entrances to the plant, preventing all but 23 employees from reporting for the Friday afternoon shift and forcing the company to shut down operations for the day.

Workers on the picket line, with Sherman Miller in the center, wearing a beret. A sign reads: "To be alive is a miracle, but to work at Mead is Death"

The Caucus put forth a "Black Workers Manifesto" with 50 demands (Note: In Class Warfare in Black Atlanta (2025), Augustus Woods writes that the "Black Manifesto" had 50 demands, whereas contemporary reporting from The Atlanta Voice says it had 47 demands.) to address racism and sexism at the plant, dramatically improve working conditions, and give workers oversight over the workplace. They demanded safety improvements, including safety equipment and better ventilation. They also requested a 50-cent raise, sick pay, and health insurance. In terms of oversight, they wanted more autonomy, including direct input on plant policies and hiring practices, as well as committees elected by the workers for escalating future concerns.

Mead management dismissed the Caucus's demands, saying that they would only negotiate with the plant union, Local 527. They argued that the wildcat strike was illegal and violated the collective bargaining agreement they had in place with Local 527. In response to management's dismissal, more workers joined the picketers outside the plant. Altogether, an estimated 75% of plant workers were on strike; many of these workers were skilled machinists, which Mead could not easily replace with strikebreakers. Local 527 sided with management and called for the strike to end.

As Mead continued to ignore the Rank and File Caucus, they took measures to try to convince workers to return to work. They purchased a large number of ads in the black community, including in The Atlanta Voice newspaper and on the radio stations WIGO, WXAP, and WAOK. Sherman Miller denounced these tactics as attempts to "sweet talk" and "brainwash" people against the strike. Georgia State Representative Ben Brown, one of the co-owners of the firm, insisted that they did not run harmful ads and said they were contracted by Mead "long before this question came up".

Although white workers joined the strike, the majority of the strikers were black. Most of the white workers at the plant continued to cross the picket line. The strikers emphasized that their grievances were not against their white coworkers: "The enemy is not the white man. It is the capitalist economic system", said one black worker.

A mutual aid network was created to collect food, clothing, and monetary aid to support the strikers. The Great Speckled Bird newspaper, which followed the news of the strike closely, encouraged its readers to donate directly to the Rank and File Caucus.

=== Injunctions ===
The day after the wildcat strike began, Fulton County Superior Court granted Mead Corporation an injunction that prohibited picketers from interfering with operations at the plant, with a full hearing scheduled for later that month. The following week, Mead Corporation held a "management-union committee" meeting with Local 527 union members and some picketers to discuss their concerns. Afterwards, the company committed to investigating discrimination and safety issues. In response, Local 527 insisted that the Caucus members and picketers return to work and give the company a chance to implement changes. However, Miller and Williams dismissed the committee as ineffective. The striking workers voted to demonstrate outside of Local 527's headquarters.

As the strike continued, Mead Corporation filed a lawsuit seeking $50,000 (equivalent to $384,845 in 2025) in damages per day from the striking workers. At another Superior Court hearing at the end of August, Mead obtained further injunctions. Judge Elmo Holt ruled that only one person at a time was allowed to cross the driveway leading into the plant, and no more than five picketers could be at each gate. His ruling also "forbade any mass demonstrations within 50 yards (46 m) of the gates". Reacting to the ruling, the workers said that this meant that most picketers had to be "at least 'a half-a-football field away' from company property". Mead management also threatened Caucus members with termination or disciplinary action, and they called police to patrol the gates during shift changes.

=== Mass demonstrations and arrests ===
Despite the court rulings that limited picketing at the plant, the workers were defiant. Williams said they would continue to picket, and he insisted that he was willing to go to jail, if necessary. "I feel that the orders violate my constitutional rights", he said in a statement to The Atlanta Voice. Going forward, the workers also refused to negotiate with Mead while the injunction restricting their picketing was active. On September 8, Mead petitioned Judge Holt to hold the picketers, including Williams, in contempt of court, citing instances where the striking workers violated the court order by gathering in large crowds near the plant's gates.

On September 18, the SCLC led a "mule train" of 300 demonstrators. Chanting and singing songs like "We Shall Not Be Moved", they started at Atlanta University Center and marched to the Mead packaging plant. The Great Speckled Bird reported that the crowd grew to 500 people by the time they reached the plant. One worker at the demonstration remarked, "There won't be no business as usual 'till Mead meets the needs of the poor people". During the afternoon shift change, the demonstrators tried to block the main entrance to the plant; one 72-year old woman, Nannie Washburn, lay down in the middle of the driveway. The Atlanta Constitution reported that the demonstrators "banged" on vehicles and threw "bottles, sticks and rocks". Police said that one Mead truck's tires were deflated, and another truck's gas line was cut, with the leaked gasoline set ablaze. Police pushed back the crowd and arrested seven people, including Washburn and three Mead workers. The Great Speckled Bird reported that most of the individuals arrested were "viciously" beaten. Five people were injured during the melee, including two demonstrators and three police officers. Some of the arrested demonstrators were later charged with "inciting a riot". In response to the arrests, The Great Speckled Bird and the SCLC called for a city-wide boycott of companies that used Mead's packaging for their food products.

Hosea Williams was one of 66 people arrested on September 21

On September 21, Williams and the SCLC staged a second mule train from Atlanta University Center to the Mead plant, this time leading two literal mules that carried a coffin on a wagon. As strike leaders spoke to the crowd gathered in front of the plant's offices, the demonstrators placed the coffin on the steps. Demonstrators who were willing to face arrest "linked arms and tried to block a driveway leading to the employes' [sic] parking lot". At least 50 Atlanta Police officers, including members of the SWAT team, began making arrests for violations of the court order that forbade mass demonstrations at the plant; the demonstrators did not resist and "stood patiently waiting to be loaded into paddywagons". Strike leaders Miller and Williams were among those detained.

In the aftermath of the demonstration on September 21, at least 66 picketers were arrested for "criminal trespassing", and several leaders of the Caucus were sentenced to 10 days in jail. However, the October League's chapter president, Mike Klonsky, charged that Atlanta Police had "brutally clubbed" and arrested over 100 picketers that day. One black worker, Klonsky said, may have been blinded by police.

=== "Red-baiting" ===
Strike leader Sherman Miller (right) being led away by police

Several leaders of the wildcat strike, including Sherman Miller, were communists. In Class Warfare in Black Atlanta (2025), labor scholar Augustus Wood writes that Mead tried "red-baiting" to convince workers in the Rank and File Caucus to remove their communist leaders and members. Wood argues that newspapers like The Atlanta Constitution and other "petty bourgeois forces" spread "anticommunist propaganda" against the strikers. This was also evident to members of the October League at the time, and the League's Atlanta chapter president Mike Klonsky spoke out against it. In an interview for the October League's paper The Call, Miller said these efforts were ultimately unsuccessful: "The workers didn't succumb to red-baiting and defended the right of communists to work in the strike."

In late September, the Fulton District Attorney's Office and the Atlanta Police Department opened an investigation into the October League's involvement in the strike, specifically insinuating that Williams of the SCLC was directly involved in the organization. In response, Williams vehemently denied any connection to the October League. His continued public denunciations ultimately drove a wedge between the SCLC and the more leftist organizers from the League. In Wood's analysis of this split, he concludes: "despite his unbridled support for Black labor struggles in Atlanta, Williams maneuvered politically when Black working-class leaders like Sherman Miller ... challenged his class position."

== Settlement and legacy ==
A settlement was reached on October 5, seven weeks after the strike began. By a vote of 124 in favor and 36 opposed, striking workers decided to accept the settlement proposal from Mead; later, they signed a pact before the mediator, the Atlanta Community Relations Commission. Mead agreed to make some safety improvements and address racism and sexism at the plant. Workers returned to work the following Sunday or Monday.

After the settlement, Local 527 representatives reiterated their position that the wildcat strike was illegal and influenced by "outside groups", like the October League and the SCLC. A Local 527 representative emphasized that the union was the only "official bargaining agent" for workers at Mead, regardless of the outcome of the wildcat strike.

According to Sherman Miller, the settlement was a victory for the Rank and File Caucus. Miller said that the workers won some of their demands, despite having no union support or financial assistance. He also said the Caucus would "carry on the struggle against discrimination and to win the things we need" and pursue the economic demands that were not met with the settlement. Using newsreel footage, the October League created a film documenting the strike called Wildcat at Mead, released the same year.

== See also ==
- List of US strikes by size
