= Klonsky =

Klonsky is a surname. Notable people with the surname include:

- Michael Klonsky (born 1943), American educator, author, and communist activist, son of Robert
- Milton Klonsky (1921–1981), American writer of literary nonfiction
- Robert Klonsky (1918–2002), American Spanish Civil War veteran and communist activist
