= Nannie Washburn =

American trade unionist and civil rights activist (1900–1996)

- Washburn in 1972
- Born: Leah Leathers; May 3, 1900; Douglasville, Georgia, US
- Died: May 1, 1996 (aged 95); Atlanta, Georgia, US
- Other name: Leah Young
- Occupations: Textile worker; activist; seamstress; licensed practical nurse
- Political party: Communist (from 1932)
- Spouses: Young (m. 1915, abandoned) Walter Washburn (m. 1951; died 1956)
- Children: 5

Nannie Leah Washburn, also spelled Nanny Washburn (née Leah Leathers; May 3, 1900 – May 1, 1996), was an American communist labor and civil rights activist from Georgia, United States. She was known for participating in labor strikes, anti-war protests, and civil rights demonstrations throughout the South for decades, into her 60s and 70s.

Born to a poor family of sharecroppers and textile workers, Washburn worked long hours for little pay as a child laborer in a cotton mill. She married at 15 and had five children, two of them born with blindness. Abandoned by her first husband, Washburn moved back in with her mother and met communist activists, including Angelo Herndon, who taught her about socialism and invited her and her family to join the Communist Party in 1932. She became a committed labor and civil rights activist.

During the Textile Workers' Strike of 1934, Washburn and her sister handed out leftist leaflets on the picket line at the Exposition Cotton Mill in Atlanta, Georgia. They were arrested and charged with inciting an insurrection under Georgia's slavery-era sedition and insurrection statute, which carried the death penalty. Their case received national attention from labor rights groups. After the Supreme Court ruled that Georgia's statute was unconstitutional in Herndon v. Lowry, their charges were dropped.

For five years, she was married to her comrade and fellow activist, Walter Washburn, until his sudden illness and death in 1956. She continued her activism and participated in demonstrations during the civil rights movement. In 1965, she and her son, who was blind, walked 50 miles (80 km) with other activists in one of the Selma to Montgomery marches. Afterwards, they joined civil rights demonstrations in Demopolis, Alabama, where she was arrested and briefly held against her will in a psychiatric hospital. Three years later, she and her son traveled to Washington D.C. to demonstrate with the Poor People's Campaign. In the 1970s, she supported striking and unemployed workers in Atlanta by participating in demonstrations that exposed her to police violence. After decades of activism, Washburn died a few days before her 96th birthday.

== Early life ==
Nannie Leah Washburn was born as Leah Leathers (Note: Her family name was "Leathers": father was S.J. Leathers, sister was Annie Mae Leathers, etc. Her married name from her first marriage was "Young", and her married name from her second marriage was "Washburn".) in 1900 in rural Douglasville, Georgia, to a family of sharecroppers. Both of her parents were "radicals", and her father was a member of the Populist Party. She described how difficult life was as a sharecropper: "the landlord gets all that you have slaved for," she wrote, "[and then] you're turned out for the winter without any means of livelihood".

A child laborer in a Georgia cotton mill, 1908

Her family moved to the Elizabeth cotton mill near Hapeville, a city in Fulton County, after textile industry agents promised it would offer good pay. Her sisters and brothers started working at the mill; according to her, eventually almost all of them were afflicted with brown lung disease. Washburn said she asked the mill boss for a job when she was 7, but he refused at first and said she was too young. Still, she started working as a child laborer at the mill when she was between 8 and 11 years old. (Note: Sources provide different ages for when Washburn started working at the mill. Charles Fager said that she started working when she was 11. Southern Exposure magazine wrote that she started when she was 9, and her obituary in The Atlanta Constitution said she started just before her eighth birthday.) She said she worked 64 hours per week and earned only $1.37 for the entire week (equivalent to $47 in 2025). The school house was 5 miles (8.0 km) away, and she only attended for a couple months. She explained: "they wouldn't pay us sharecroppers' children no attention". She said she taught herself to read when she was a teenager.

In an autobiographical pamphlet published by the October League in 1976, Washburn wrote about racist violence committed against Black people in her community when she was a child. According to her, one day the superintendent of the Elizabeth cotton mill sent someone to tell the white people in the village to go to the mill and shut the doors. She wrote that during the night, Black families' homes were burned down, and Black people in the community were lynched.

When she was 15, Washburn married a man with the surname Young. She described the marriage as a form of slavery and "legal prostitution", in which she was forced to have children she could not afford to care for. She said she contracted sexually-transmitted infections from her husband twice, which caused two of her children to become blind. Washburn believed that society was "rotten" for putting women in her situation, and she wrote that "Women ought to be free". Ultimately, her husband deserted her and their five children.

=== Political awakening ===
Washburn's brothers joined the Industrial Workers of the World (IWW) in 1918 and moved to Tacoma, Washington, for work. When they returned home, they brought "a big suitcase full of literature". Washburn said she loved to hear her brothers talk about the October Revolution in Russia. "That old tsar ought to been killed years ago [because] he was living in a gold house, gold luxuries and the people was having babies in the street," her brother Archie would say. Washburn and her brothers wanted to see a revolution in the United States, too.

In 1930, Washburn and her children moved in with her elderly mother in Atlanta, and she began working again in the textile mills. This was during the height of the Great Depression, when unemployment levels were high and families like hers were "miserable" and in a "destitute condition". According to the city of Atlanta, as many as 25,000 out of 150,000 families received welfare assistance, but communist organizers said the city intentionally excluded many unemployed families. Washburn recalled that the city distributed rotten food leftover from the farmers market to welfare recipients, which fomented discontent among the unemployed and led to protests.

Washburn began reading The Daily Worker, a leftist newspaper, and she met two Black communist organizers, Angelo Herndon and Otto Hall. It was Hall who taught her and her family about socialism and recruited them to the Communist Party; they officially joined in 1932. In her words, Washburn "learned [her] ABC's of capitalism and Marxist–Leninism", and she developed class consciousness. At the time, Atlanta police targeted and arrested members of the Communist Party, making membership effectively illegal in the state of Georgia. Despite repression and limited resources, communist activists continued to organize unemployed workers in Atlanta neighborhoods. Washburn and her family attended rallies, distributed leaflets to help grow the Party, and met fellow activists like Harry Haywood. They also worked to mobilize support for Herndon after he was arrested and charged with insurrection, accused of circulating "insurrectionary literature" and seeking to "overthrow the government".

== Early labor organizing ==
=== Textile workers strike (1934) ===
During the Textile Workers' Strike of 1934, Washburn and her sister Annie Mae Leathers were on the picket line with striking workers at the Exposition Cotton Mills in Atlanta. Annie Mae worked at the mill and was a member of the American Federation of Labor (AFL) at the time. The sisters stayed at the strike for hours, encouraging workers not to return to the mill and distributing working class leaflets and reading material, including The Daily Worker newspaper and The Rank and File Federationist. They were soon arrested by Atlanta police and charged with "circulating insurrectionist literature". The bond for each of them was set at $5,000 (equivalent to $120,336 in 2025). Under the Georgia insurrection law, they faced the possibility of the death penalty. The sisters' arrests sparked a new wave of raids against communist activists in Atlanta.

Washburn (then known as Leah Young) wrote a letter from prison, which was published in The Daily Worker. In it, she criticized the AFL and the United Textile Workers of America, calling on workers to form their own militant "rank and file" union to oppose the "capitalist class". During a hearing a few days later, she took the stand and described the long hours, poor wages, and dangerous conditions endured by textile workers. The sisters were represented by a Black attorney from the International Labor Defense (ILD) named John Greer through some of the legal proceedings, making them the first white women represented by an African American, according to historian Georgina Hickey.

Washburn (right) and her sister in 1934, just released after 74 days in jail

Prison was difficult, and Washburn said that the matron of the women's prison beat the sisters for being communists and tried to agitate the other prisoners to kill them. Finally, after 74 days, they were released on bail, thanks to the efforts of activist Hosea Hudson, attorney Benjamin J. Davis Jr., and the ILD. However, their fates were tied to Angelo Herndon, who had been arrested in 1932, convicted of insurrection under the same Georgia statute that the sisters were charged under, and sentenced to 20 years on a chain gang. The ILD and other national organizations campaigned to repeal the statute, which they said was rooted in slavery-era laws that were designed to punish enslaved people for conspiring against their slavers. Ultimately, the Supreme Court ruled that Georgia's insurrection statute was too vague and was unconstitutional, as it infringed on Herndon's free speech rights. With this decision, Washburn and her sister were also free, and the state dropped the insurrection charges against them in 1939. As for the textile workers whom the sisters had walked with on the picket line, they faced discrimination for striking and were blocked from reemployment. In Washburn's words, "the workers – they were sold out".

=== The Work Projects Administration (WPA) ===
In the 1930s, Washburn and her family members lost their jobs and went to the Work Projects Administration (WPA) for employment. She got a job as a seamstress (paid for by the government through the WPA) and joined the Workers Alliance (WA) and the WPA union. When she was fired for trying to organize her workplace, the WA led protests for her and others who had lost their jobs. After a week, they were reinstated. Washburn described how her supervisor almost fainted from shock when she walked back in to the WPA office.

While Washburn acknowledged the benefits of the WPA, she rejected the notion that President Roosevelt alone was responsible for "a good New Deal". She maintained that it was the workers themselves who fought for and won their jobs: "How we won many victories was get out in droves by the thousands and thousands into Washington, White House and march, demand".

== Second marriage ==
In October 1951, Washburn married her second husband, Walter Washburn, an electrician by trade. She described him as a "comrade" who treated her as an equal. "He knew my life was tied up in the class struggle," she said, "and he was the same way". Walter was a "veteran radical" who had been on the defense committee for Angelo Herndon in the 1930s and served as an advisor to the Southern Folk School and Libraries, an educational outreach program for farmers and workers. At one point during his years of activism, he was kidnapped by the Ku Klux Klan, and they "flogged" him severely. He never fully recovered from his injuries. In January 1956, Walter fell ill and died suddenly.

== Grandmother and activist ==
Harry Haywood (speaking) and Washburn (right) at a dinner hosted by the October League on March 13, 1976

Washburn was called a "radical firebrand" and a "crusader for civil rights" for her years of activism. In the 1940s and 1950s, she opposed the proliferation of nuclear weapons. Throughout the 1960s and 1970s, when she was a grandmother and great-grandmother, she was arrested numerous times for demonstrating for civil and labor rights and for marching in anti-Vietnam War protests. For Washburn, being anti-war was connected to her civil rights and labor advocacy. At one 1969 protest against police brutality, her placard read "Support the Boys in Vietnam ... Bring them home now" on one side and "Fare Increases Hurt the Poor" on the other. She was a Southern Conference Education Fund (SCEF) board member and a member of the October League.

In 1976, folk singer-songwriter Anne Romaine wrote a protest song about Washburn titled "Georgia Cotton Mill Woman". She performed the song on the Southern Grassroots Music Tour.

=== Selma march and Demopolis (1965) ===
In March 1965, Washburn and her family were upset by scenes from "Bloody Sunday" on the news, in which Black people crossing the Edmund Pettus Bridge were beaten by police. That same day, her daughter Nellie drove Washburn and her son Joe, who was blind, (Note: Washburn described her son, Joe Young, as being born with blindness. A newspaper account of the Selma march in 1965 describes Young as having completely lost his eyesight in the preceding eight years.) to Selma, Alabama. When they arrived, they registered at Brown Chapel A.M.E. Church. Washburn insisted that her daughter help in the kitchen, while she helped as a hostess in the dining room. She said she feared that the segregationist George Wallace would send in "Klan or some drunk person" to hurt people in the church, so she was constantly on watch.

Washburn and Joe joined other activists at City Hall to support Black people who were trying to vote. The National Guard was there, and she said that they struck demonstrators who stepped over a line in the street. She and her son were also knocked over.

Afterwards, Washburn and her son Joe joined one of the marches from Selma to Montgomery to protest police brutality. They walked fifty miles, sleeping in cow pastures at night. The Ku Klux Klan burned crosses along the highway. When they reached Montgomery, Washburn's feet were in "bad shape", and she had to get them treated.

"I walked for freedom, because I knew I'd never be free in white skin as long as the black people was in chains with black skin. See, a white person can't be free .... poor people, they cain't [sic] be free, until the black people's free."

— Washburn, in an interview with Howell Raines (c. 1977)

Because she was a licensed practical nurse (LPN), Washburn said she was picked to help the representatives of the Medical Committee for Human Rights, who were operating in the area. They told her about violence in Demopolis, Alabama, so she went with Nellie and Joe to treat injured people and support the civil rights demonstrations there. In Demopolis, Joe was maced and arrested at a demonstration, and Washburn was arrested while she was cleaning the front steps of the church where demonstrators were sheltering from the police.

After transporting her between jails, the police took her to a psychiatric hospital in nearby Tuscaloosa. For 21 days, she was held at that institution against her will, and she said they forced her to take tranquilizers and threatened her with electroshock therapy. She was finally able to leave after her family found out what happened to her and contacted the facility to attest to her sanity.

=== Poor People's Campaign (1968) ===
In 1968, Washburn and her son, Joe, traveled to Washington D.C. to take part in the Poor People's Campaign. In the lead-up to the campaign, activists formed "caravans" of buses to travel together to D.C. Washburn was described as "the [Southern] caravan's nurse". During the month-long demonstrations in D.C., she and Joe lived in a tent alongside other marchers in "Resurrection City" on the National Mall.

=== Mead wildcat strike (1972) ===
In September 1972, Washburn supported the Mead wildcat strike in Atlanta, where a rank-and-file caucus of predominantly Black workers demanded better wages, safer working conditions, and an end to racist and sexist discrimination. A "mule train" of demonstrators, led by the members of the October League and Southern Christian Leadership Conference (SCLC), marched from Atlanta University Center to the Mead packaging plant. Police moved in to make arrests, grabbing several of the communist strike leaders and pulling them away to the police wagon.

In a moment captured in the documentary about the strike, Wildcat at Mead (1972), Washburn managed to grab Sherman Miller, a young Black communist member of the October League, before the police pushed past her. After the communist strike leaders were arrested, the SCLC led demonstrators to block the main entrance to the plant during the afternoon shift change, and Washburn laid down in the driveway to stop traffic. Ultimately, she was one of seven people arrested that day. The Great Speckled Bird newspaper reported that most of the individuals arrested were "viciously" beaten.

=== "Fight Back" movement (1974–1975) ===
Washburn (age 73) arrested at the "Fight Back" protest in April 1974

During the economic recession in 1974 and 1975, workers in Atlanta took to the streets to protest mass layoffs throughout city government and cutbacks to city services. These "Fight Back" demonstrations included a coalition of workers in the American Federation of State, County and Municipal Employees (AFSCME) union, workers from different industries, unemployed workers, welfare recipients, and labor activists. The demonstrators also formed a group called the Atlanta Workers Committee to Fight Back (AWCTFB).

On April 23, 1974, Washburn joined demonstrators with the AWCTFB as they gathered at the offices of Labor Commissioner Sam Caldwell. However, Caldwell locked himself inside and did not engage with the workers' committee. At this point, the demonstrators were considered to be trespassing. The Great Speckled Bird and the AWCTFB reported that protesters were "physically assaulted and abused" by police, including Washburn, who was "dragged to the paddy wagon and literally thrown in". Fourteen activists were arrested; ten of them, later nicknamed the "Fightback 10", were charged. On November 20, 1975, during one part of the trial for the "Fightback 10", witnesses for the defendants testified that police had mistreated Washburn.

On December 28–29, 1975, a National Fight Back Conference of 1,500 communist activists and workers was held in Chicago. Washburn was one of the older attendees, alongside figures like Harry Haywood. The Guardian newspaper noted that she and Haywood were notable links to the "revolutionary communist movement of the 1930s".

== Death and legacy ==
Washburn died in Atlanta on May 1, 1996, two days before her 96th birthday. She was survived by three of her five children, nine grandchildren, twenty-two great-grandchildren, and twelve great-great-grandchildren. Atlanta mayor Bill Campbell declared her birthday, May 3, as "Nannie Washburn Memorial Day".
