= Child labor in the United States =

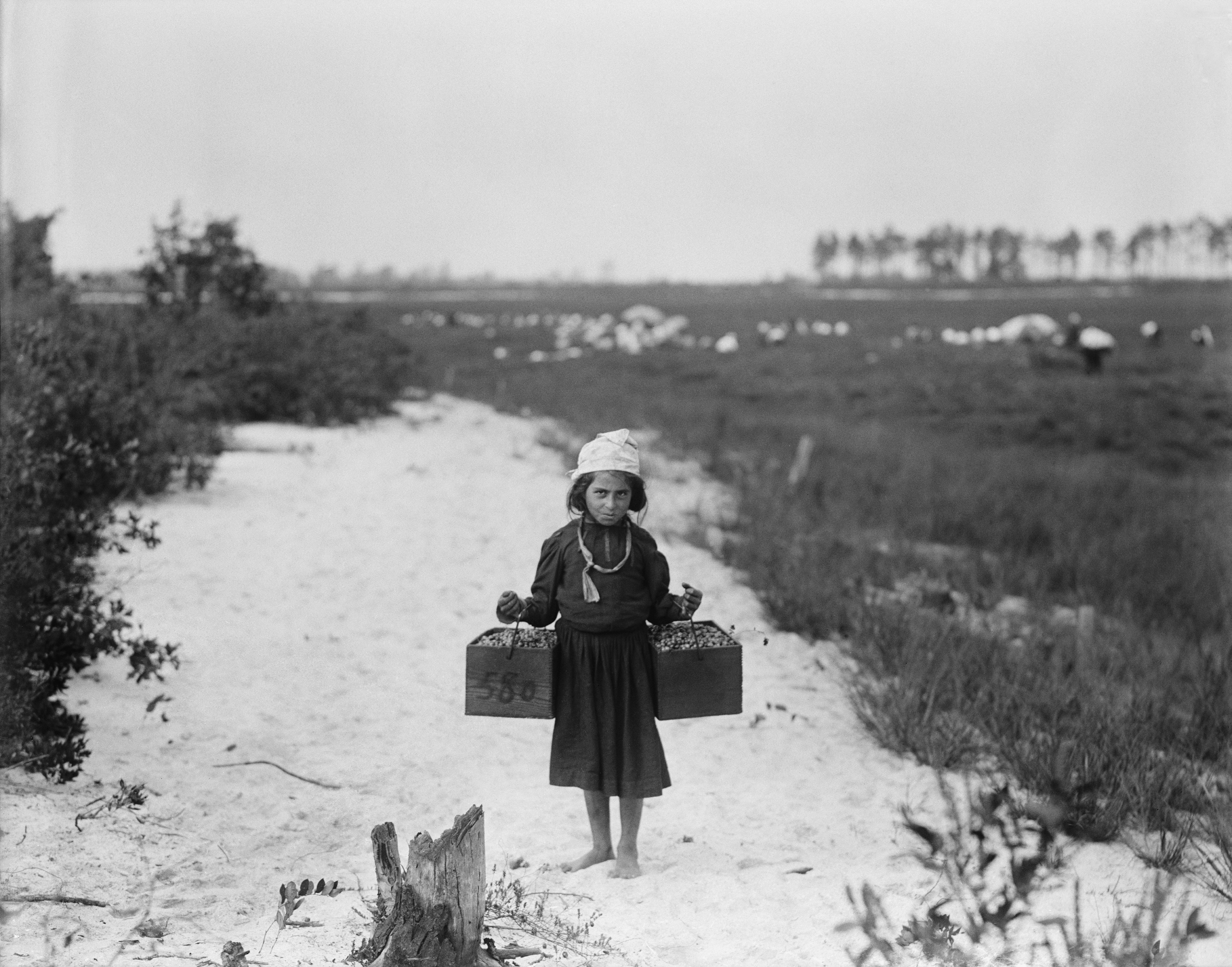
Rose Biodo, a 10-year-old worker in Philadelphia, c. 1910. Photo by Lewis W. Hine.

Child labor in the United States was a common phenomenon across the economy in the 19th century. Outside agriculture, it gradually declined in the early 20th century, except in the South which added children to textile and other industries. Child labor remained common in the agricultural sector until compulsory school laws were enacted by the states. A national law against child labor was passed in 1916, but it was overturned by the Supreme Court in 1918. A 1919 law was also overturned. In the 1920s, an effort to pass a constitutional amendment failed, because of opposition from the South and from Catholics. The Fair Labor Standards Act (part of the New Deal) in 1938 finally ended child labor in factories, mines, and other occupations. Child labor has always been a factor in agriculture and that continues into the 21st century.

There has been a large rise in child labor in the 2020s amid the COVID-19 pandemic, in sectors such as meat packing and light industry, with a tight labor market increasing worker demand. Several states have proposed or enacted measures to loosen restrictions and make it easier for employers to employ children.

== History ==
=== Colonial and early national ===
In an overwhelmingly rural society, farmers discovered that children as young as six or seven could usefully handle chores assigned along gender lines. In the cities, at a time when schools were uncommon outside New England, girls had household and child care chores while boys at about age 12 were apprenticed to craftsmen. Colonial America had a surplus of good farmland and a shortage of workers, so criminals in England kidnapped London youth to spirit them away for resale in Virginia. Parliament made it a priority to catch and prosecute offenders.

In many rural towns until the 1830 or so, the apprenticeship system gave way to factory employment for poor children, and school attendance for the middle classes. At the age of 13, orphan children were sent into a trade or domestic work due to laws that sought to prevent idle children from becoming a burden to society. In the apprenticeship system, children whose parents died or are unable to support them were routinely placed outside of their homes under indenture contracts with a master who provided substance in exchange for the child’s labor. Many states during this period followed Pennsylvania's lead in enacting laws that prohibited matching children with masters who were of a different faith from the apprentice because of an expectation that masters should improve not only apprentices’ trade skills, but also their moral and religious upbringing.

In the 1840s, labor started to shift away from families, to hiring older individuals, especially new immigrants from Ireland and Canada.

=== 19th century ===
As the North industrialized in the first half of the 19th century, factories and mines hired young workers for a variety of tasks. According to the 1900 census, of the children ages ten to fifteen, 18 percent were employed: 1,264,000 boys and 486,000 girls. Most worked on family farms. Every decade following 1870, the number of children in the workforce increased, with the percentage not dropping until the 1920s. Especially in textile mills, children were often hired together with both parents and could be hired for only $2 a week. Their parents could both work in the mill and watch their children at the same time. Children had an advantage as their small statures were useful for fixing machinery and squeezing into small spaces. Many families in mill towns depended on the children's labor to make enough money for necessities. In mining towns, many parents often helped their children thwart child laws that did exist since miners were paid per carload of coal and any additional help to move the coal meant an increase in pay.

=== Farming ===
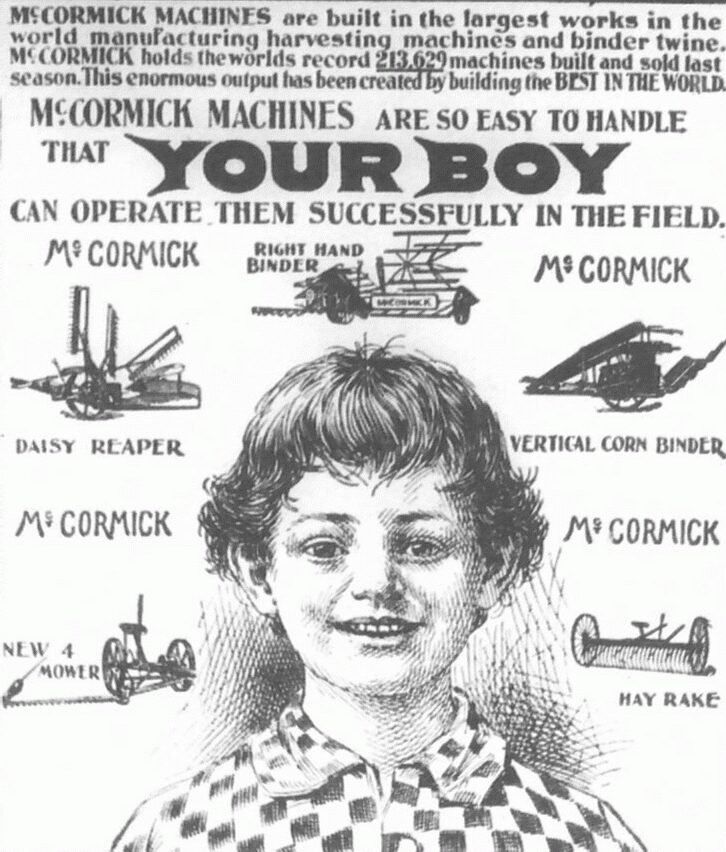
1900 ad for McCormick farm machines: "McCormick machines are so easy to handle that your boy can successfully operate them in the field"

Advocates for reform began crusading against factories, which they considered debilitating to growing children and threatened to damage them permanently. They saw farm labor as an entirely different matter—indeed, an American ideal. According to activist Alexander McKelway in 1905, open-air farm work was "beneficial in developing a strong physical constitution." Harvest season did not interfere with the scheduled school year, he added, and being under the beneficial and watchful eye of parents strengthened the family.

Using census data processed by Lee Craig, Robert Whaples concludes for the Midwest in the mid-19th century:

For each child aged 7 to 12 the family's output increased by about $16 per year—only 7 percent of the [$230] income produced by a typical adult male. Teen-aged females boosted family farm income by only about $22, while teen-aged males boosted income by $58. Because of these low productivity levels, families couldn't really strike it rich by putting their children to work. When viewed as an investment, children had a strikingly negative rate of return because the costs of raising them generally exceeded the value of the work they performed.

From 1910 to 1920, more than 60 percent of child workers in the United States were employed in agriculture. A son born into a farm family was worth real cash in terms of productivity and needing to hire less outside labor, as well as an heir to the family property. Some children preferred work over school since earning wages earned them respect in their homes, they were punished in the form of corporal punishment at school, and did not like to read or write, instead of working.

According to Kent Hendrickson, two New Deal laws had a major impact on sugar beet farming in the Great Plains. The Jones-Costigan Act of 1934 and the Sugar Act of 1937 improved working conditions somewhat. However, they were written primarily to aid the growers and the sugar processing mills. Much of the field work was done by migrant Mexicans, who faced low wages, child labor and poor housing.

=== Early 20th century ===
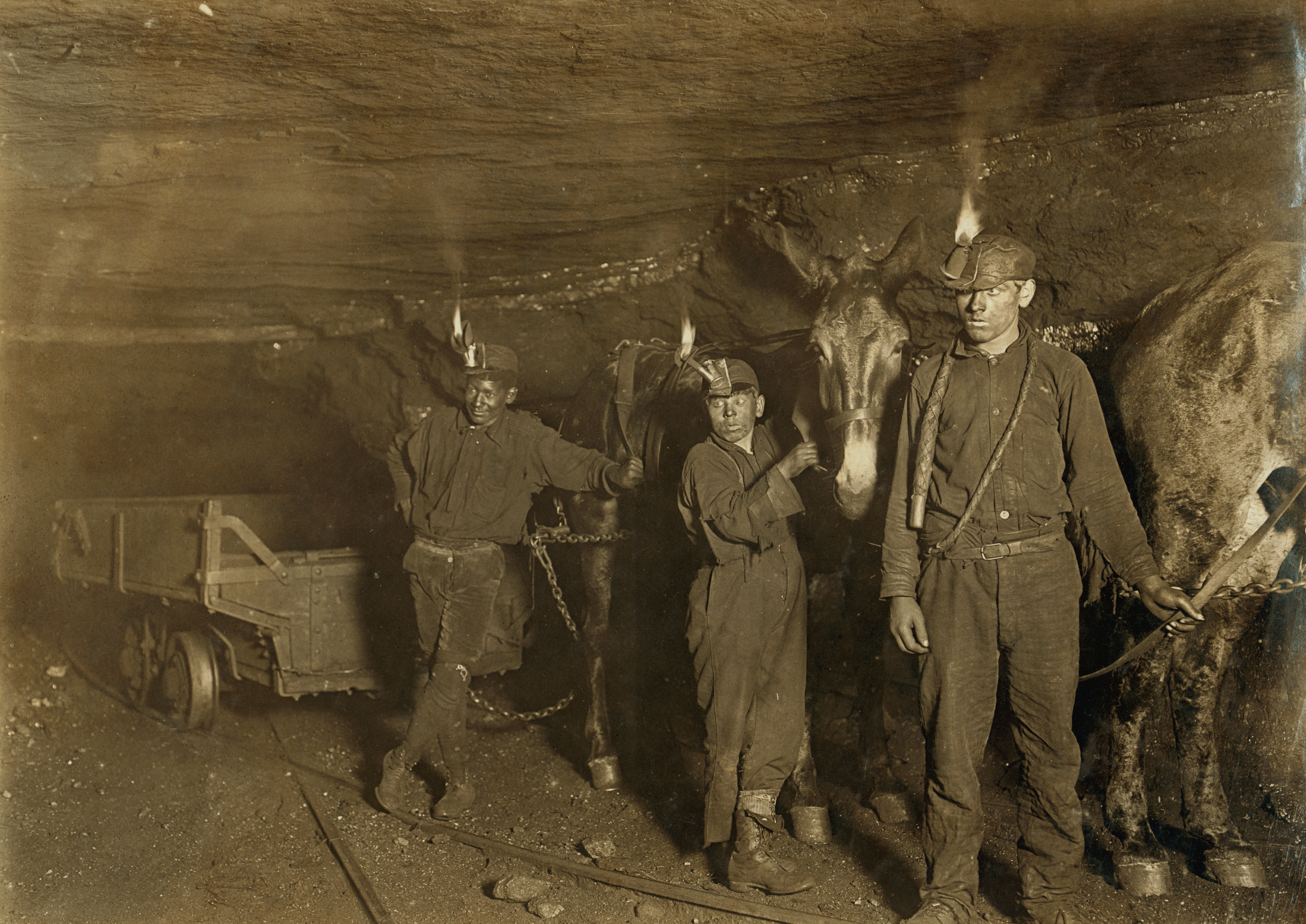
Children working with mules in a coal mine in West Virginia in 1908.

In the early 20th century, opponents of child labor cooperated with other Progressive Era reformers and American Federation of Labor (AFL) unions to organize at the state level. In 1904, a major national organization emerged, the National Child Labor Committee (NCLC). In state after state, reformers launched crusades to pass laws restricting child labor, with the ultimate goals of rescuing young bodies and increasing school attendance. The frustrations included the Supreme Court striking down two national laws as unconstitutional, and the weak enforcement of state laws that impacted local businesses.

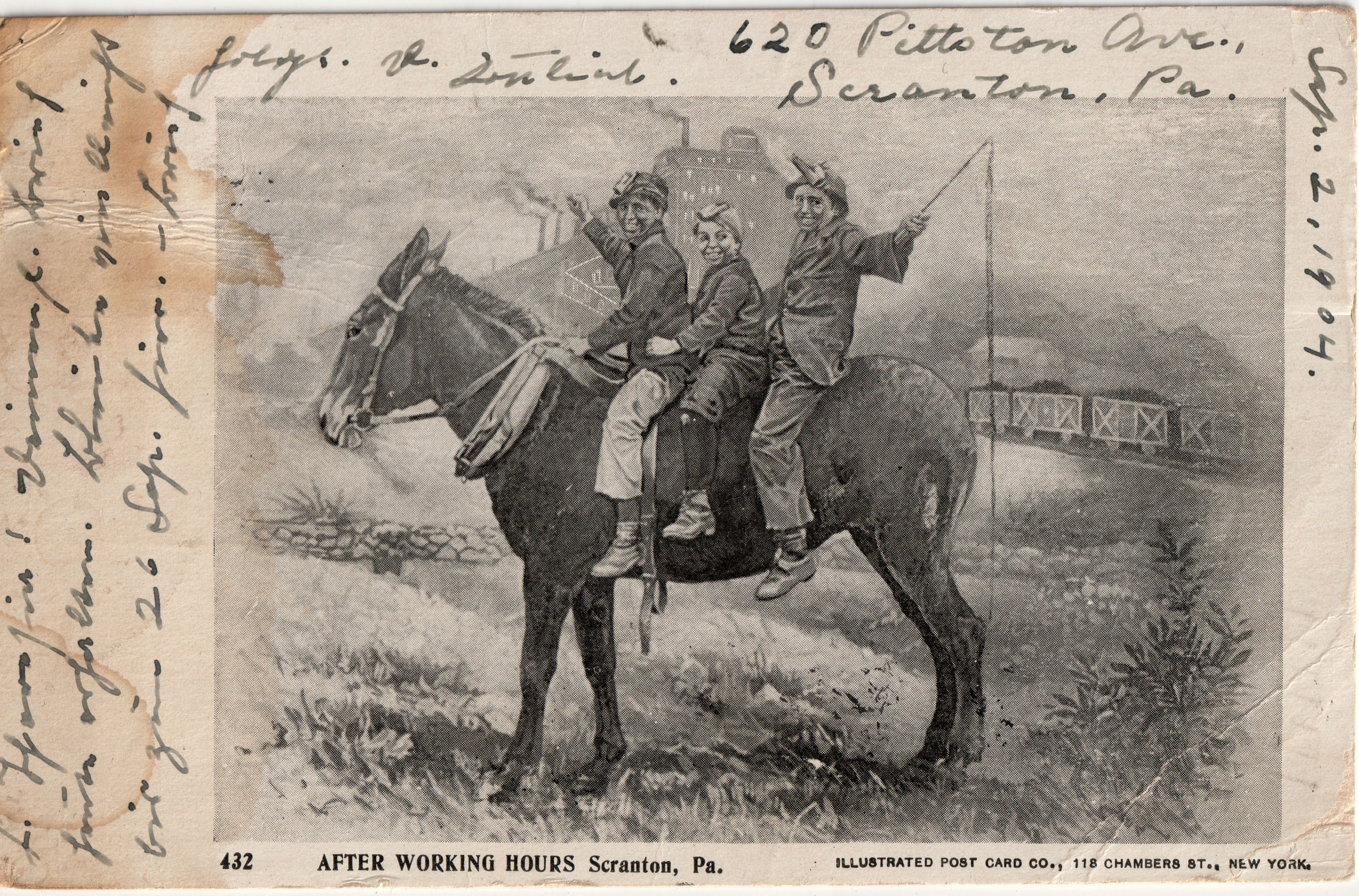
Child coal miners ride a horse after working hours in Scranton, Pennsylvania, about 1904

An effective tool was publicity, especially photographs in muckraking magazines that showed bad working conditions. The most successful of their crusaders was photographer Lewis Hine. In 1908, he became the photographer for the NCLC, which had good contact with the muckraking press. Over the next decade, Hine focused on the negative side of child labor. In the North, reformers were often successful in getting legislation on the books, but were disappointed when enforcement was handled by patronage appointees who proved reluctant to challenge the business community. Meanwhile, in the South legislation was opposed by rapidly growing textile mills that undercut Northern competitors with cheap wages. Starting in 1898, Montgomery, Alabama, minister Edgar Gardner Murphy crusaded to end child labor across the South but had little success.

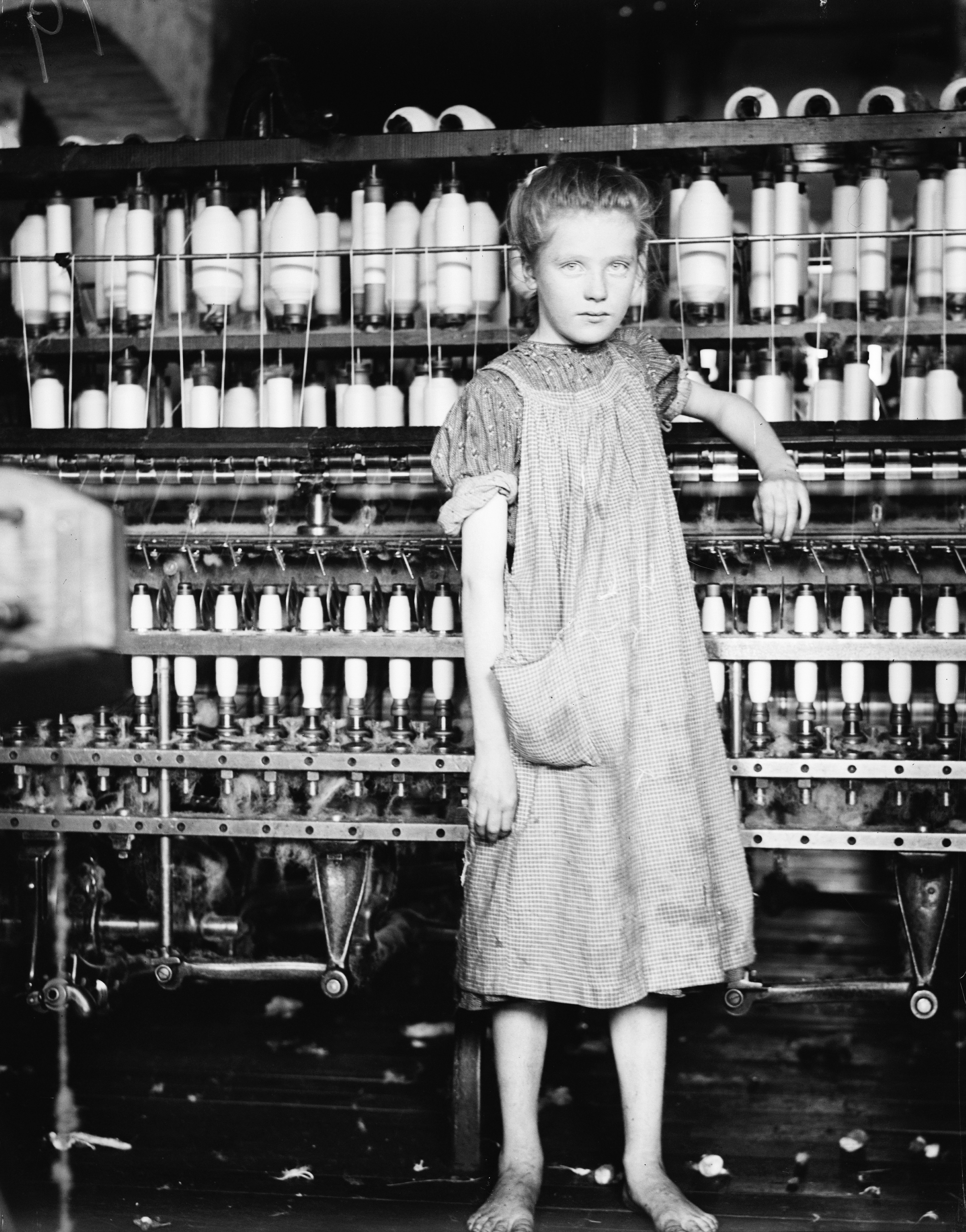
"Addie Card, 12 years. Spinner in North Pormal Cotton Mill. Vt." by Lewis Hine, 1912. Hine's photographs were designed to turn public opinion against child labor. This image was used on a 1998 US stamp to commemorate the passage of the Keating–Owen Act.

In Congress, a leading proponent was Senator Albert J. Beveridge Republican of Indiana. He tried—and failed—to get the first national bill passed. Unlike the Republican leadership, the Democratic leadership was not beholden to employers, and thus was more supportive of controls on child labor and other laws promoted by labor unions. Alexander McKelway (1866–1918), a staunch supporter of Woodrow Wilson, campaigned for such laws as the 1916 Keating–Owen Act. The Keating–Owen Act prohibited shipment in interstate commerce of goods manufactured or processed by child labor. However, in 1918 the law was deemed unconstitutional by the United States Supreme Court in a five-to-four decision in Hammer v. Dagenhart. The court, although acknowledging child labor as a social evil, felt that the Keating-Owen Act overstepped Congress' power to regulate trade. The bill was immediately revised and again deemed unconstitutional by the Supreme Court. A similar 1919 law was also overturned. In the 1920s, an effort to pass a constitutional amendment failed because of opposition from the South and from Catholics. The South finally passed compulsory school laws and by the late 1920s, children under 15 were rarely hired by mills or factories. Finally, in the Fair Labor Standards Act of 1938, the New Deal successfully ended most child labor outside agriculture.

Newsboys sold the latest edition of daily newspapers on the street. They worked as contractors without benefits. Age was a disadvantage as younger boys collected more tips. The newspaper publishers needed their work and editors shielded them from child labor laws while romanticizing their entrepreneurial enterprise and downplaying their squalid life under dangerous conditions.

== After 1933: Laws to reduce child labor ==
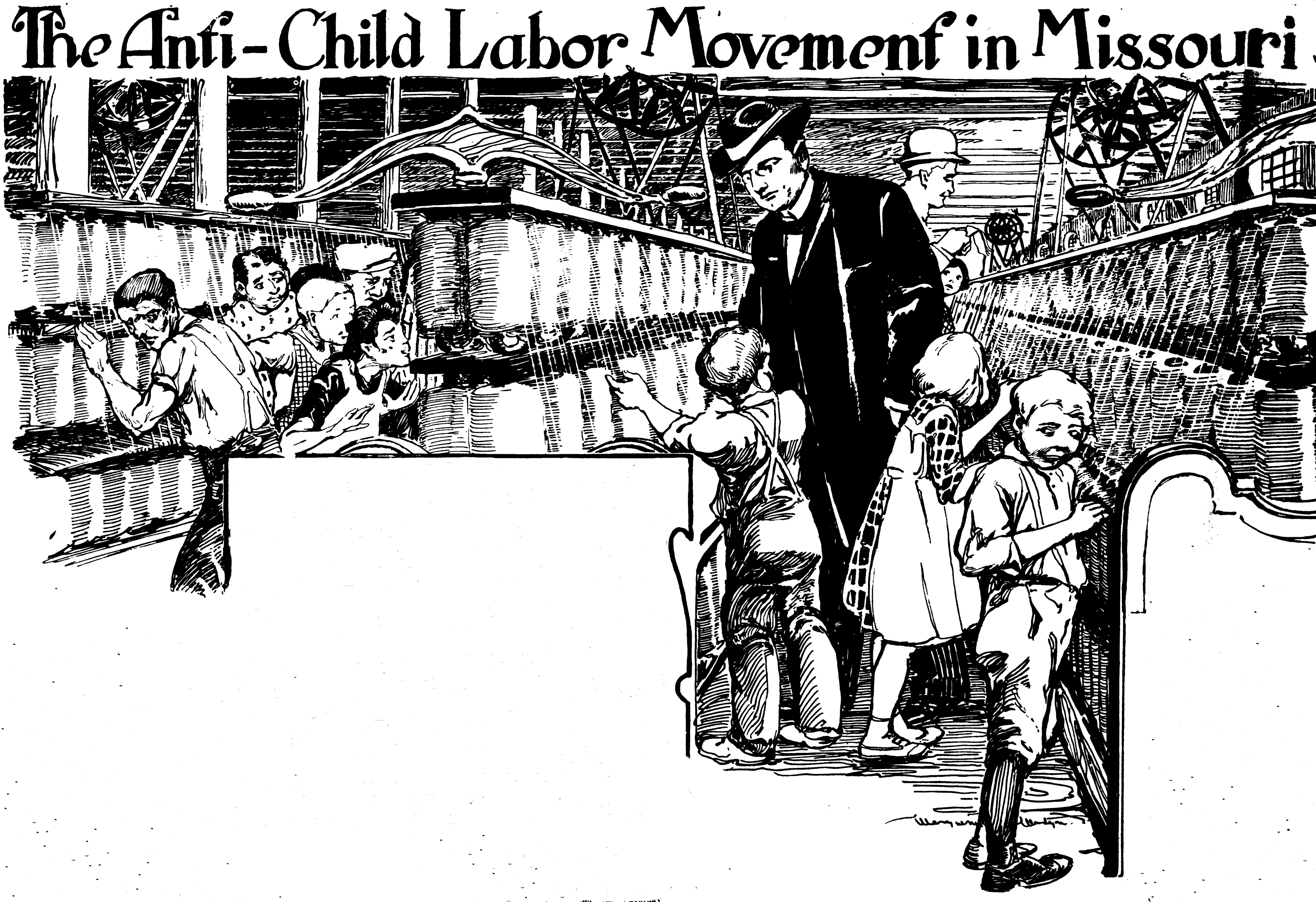
Missouri Governor Joseph W. Folk inspecting child laborers in 1906 in an image drawn by journalist Marguerite Martyn

The most sweeping federal law that restricts the employment and abuse of child workers is the 1938 Fair Labor Standards Act (FLSA). Its child labor provisions were designed to protect the educational opportunities of youth and prohibit their employment in jobs that are detrimental to their health and safety. FLSA raised the coverage to youth under 18 years of age and lists hazardous occupations too dangerous for them to perform. It does not apply to agricultural work, which has always been the arena for most child labor. Under the FLSA, for non-agricultural jobs, children under 14 may not be employed, children between 14 and 16 may be employed in allowed occupations during limited hours, and children between 16 and 17 may be employed for unlimited hours in non-hazardous occupations.

Many of the restrictions were temporarily put on hold in World War II, as enlarging factory employment became a national priority. The number of employed youth, ages 14 to 17, tripled from 870,000 in 1940 to 2.8 million in 1944, as high school enrollment dropped by one million. Motivating factors included patriotism, materialism, and dislike of school.

In agriculture, studies in the 1960s showed that Hispanic and other families employed as farm laborers needed the income generated by their children. However, the children showed severe educational retardation.

In 1980, David Koch pledged to "abolish" child labor laws as a part of his vice president campaign on the Libertarian ticket. In 1982, Ronald Reagan expanded the legal range of jobs permitted for children ages 14 and 15, and made it easier for employers to pay less than minimum wage.

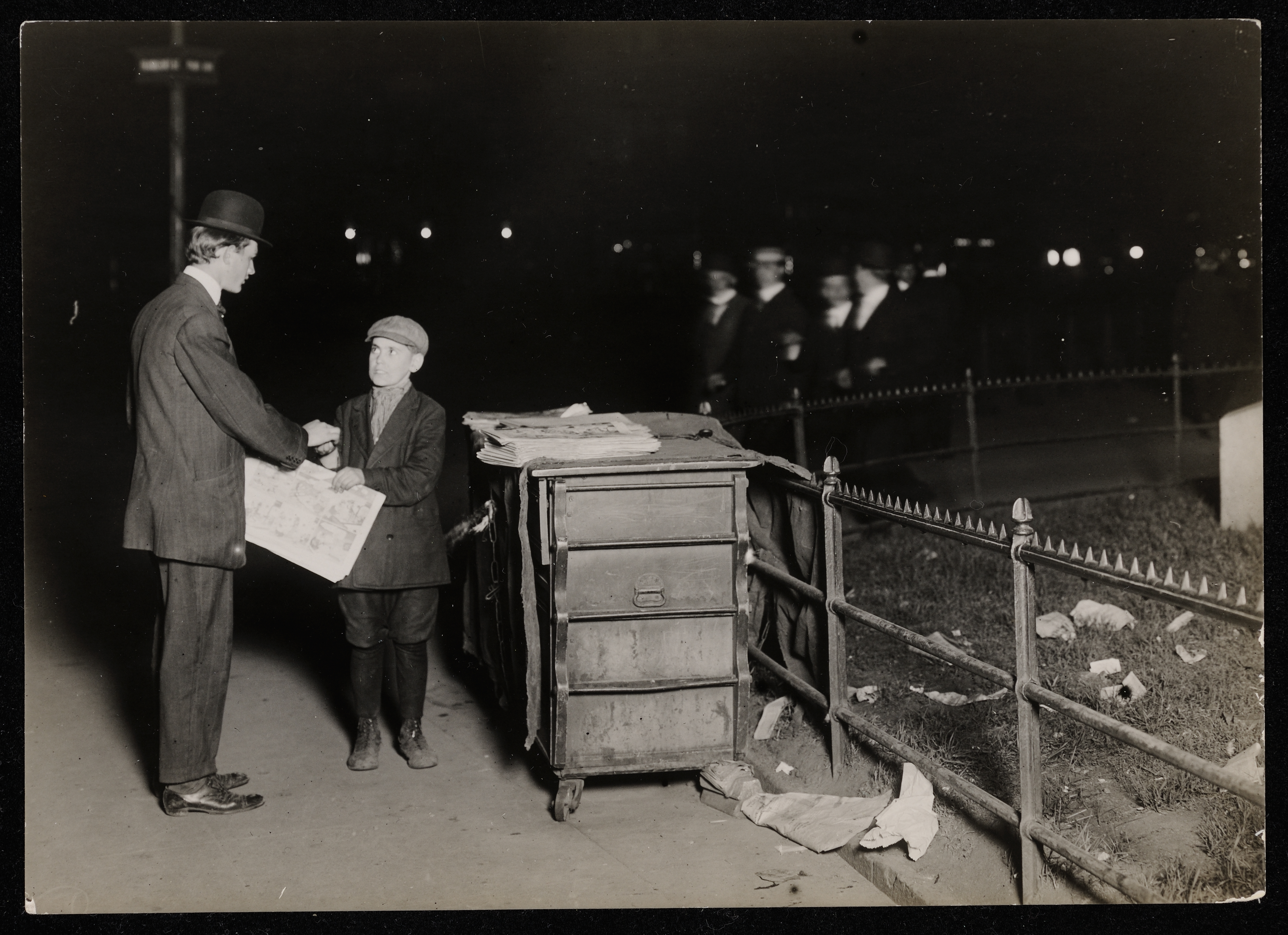
14 year old newsboy working past midnight in New York, 1910

States have varying laws covering youth employment. Each state has minimum requirements such as the earliest age a child may begin working, the number of hours a child is allowed to work during the day, and the number of hours a child is allowed to work during the week. The United States Department of Labor lists the minimum requirements for agricultural work in each state.

Individual states have a wide range of restrictions on labor by minors, often requiring work permits for minors who are still enrolled in high school, limiting the times and hours that minors can work by age and imposing additional safety regulations.

== 21st century ==
Koch-funded organizations, Cato Institute, Foundation for Economic Education, and Commonwealth Foundation, produced reports arguing for the value of increased child labor and eliminating minimum wage for children. The Foundation for Government Accountability worked directly with state legislators to introduce bills eliminating regulations.

By 2023, states such as Arkansas, Iowa, New Hampshire, and New Jersey had loosened child labor restrictions following the lessening of the COVID-19 pandemic severity, with violations increasing nationwide as a tight labor market increased worker demand. Since 2021, at least 28 states have introduced legislation to weaken child labor laws and 12 states have passed them. Modifications included lowering the age at which children could work certain jobs, expanding the number of and timing of hours they could be required to work, often to include school time, and shielding businesses from civil liability for work-related injuries, illnesses, or deaths sustained by such workers. For example, legislation in Iowa would allow children to work in meat-packing and light industry factories. According to the Economic Policy Institute, from 2015 to 2022, the number of minors employed in violation of child labor laws increased by 283% and the number of minors employed in violation of hazardous occupation orders increased by 94%. In response to this trend, in 2024 at least 14 states proposed new legislation to strengthen child labor laws.

Major recent incidents include Packers Sanitation Services employing children in slaughterhouses, and Hyundai employing children to operate heavy equipment, many against the threat of deportation. Exemptions in labor laws allowing children as young as 12 to work legally on commercial farms for unlimited hours remain in place. One estimate by Reid Maki, coordinator of the Child Labor Coalition at the National Consumers League, put the number of children working in agriculture in 2018 at between 300,000 and 400,000 children.

In 2023, a 16-year-old boy died in an accident at a Mississippi poultry plant. Just a month prior, it was revealed that meatpacking and produce firms were allegedly hiring underage migrants in at least 11 states. In Louisville, Kentucky, two 10-year-old children were illegally working at McDonald's, where they handled deep fryer equipment and worked as late as 2 a.m., receiving little to no payment, costing the franchise a $212,000 fine that would later reveal that more than 300 minors were illegally working for the establishment.

In April 2025, the Solidarity Center, the Global March Against Child Labor, and the American Institute for Research (AIR) initiated a lawsuit challenging the Trump administration’s sudden termination of international labor rights initiatives designed to combat child labor and other violations of human rights. They called for the cessation of funding reductions implemented by Elon Musk’s purported "Department of Government Efficiency," contending that these programs had been sanctioned by Congress and that the Secretary of Labor lacked the power to revoke the funding.

In recent years, investigative reports from various parts of the United States have revealed that children are enduring exhausting night shifts in slaughterhouses and are operating highly dangerous machinery in auto body factories. In October 2024, the Department of Labor disclosed that violations of child labor laws had surged by 88 percent since 2019. Children are subjected to demanding 12-hour shifts in extreme heat and are exposed to harmful pesticides and other risks. Under the Biden administration, the Department of Labor has intensified the enforcement of child labor regulations. However, this effort has been hindered by reductions in federal personnel and funding during the Trump administration. Additionally, the immigration policies of the Trump administration have further marginalized children engaged in perilous child labor.

== See also ==
- Child labour for worldwide efforts
  - Child labour in Canada
- History of childhood
  - History of childhood in the United States
- Newsboys' strike of 1899 in New York City
- Newspaper hawker includes newsboys
- Packers Sanitation Services illegal employment of children – Slaughterhouse cleaning in the United States
- History of poverty in the United States
