= My Soul Is Rested =

1977 book of oral history by Howell Raines

My Soul Is Rested: Movement Days in the Deep South Remembered
- First edition
- Author: Howell Raines
- Language: English
- Subject: American Civil Rights Movement
- Publisher: G.P. Putnam's Sons
- Publication date: 1977
- Publication place: United States
- Media type: Hardcover Print
- Pages: 472
- ISBN: 0-399-11853-5
- OCLC: 2644348
- Dewey Decimal: 323.4/0975
- LC Class: E185.61 .R235 1977

My Soul Is Rested: Movement Days in the Deep South Remembered is a book of oral history regarding the American Civil Rights Movement by journalist Howell Raines. It is based on interviews with people involved in — for and against — the struggle to end racial segregation in the American South from the time of the 1955 Montgomery bus boycott to the 1968 assassination of Martin Luther King Jr.

== Author's notes ==
Raines began his research for this book while the political editor for the Atlanta Constitution. In February 1974, while looking at a statue of Georgian populist Thomas E. Watson from his office window, he pondered recent indications that Watson's dream of a Southern politics that did not pander to racial hatred might be at hand. He felt that the story of sacrifice and courage that had led to these changes needed to be more completely told by the people who lived it.

As a journalist in Atlanta, Raines already had access to members of the movement who had since become prominent politicians in the South. As he conducted interviews he obtained from the interviewees names and contact information for others who should be included. His southern heritage also helped to obtain interviews with people who had fought racial desegregation.

All but two of the interviews included were expressly conducted for this book between October 1974 and April 1976. The interview with Autherine Lucy was conducted by Culpepper Clark, a historian at the University of Alabama. The material from Martin Luther King, Sr. was excerpted from in interview conducted by the author for a television program on PBS station KETV in Atlanta.

The book took nineteen months to complete. In the meantime Raines had left the Constitution to work on it. By the time it was published he had become the political editor at the St. Petersburg Times.

== Interviewees included ==
- Ralph Abernathy
- T. M. Alexander, Sr.
- Ben Allen
- Harry Alston
- Wilson Baker
- Marion Barry
- Nelson Benton
- Randolph Blackwell
- Willie Bolden
- Julian Bond
- Harry Bowie
- Helen Bullard
- John Calhoun
- Charles Cobb
- Stoney Cooks
- Dorothy Cotton
- Constance W. Curry
- Dave Dennis
- Ivanhoe Donaldson
- Andrew Durgan
- Glenn V. Evans
- James Farmer
- Autherine Lucy Foster
- Ed Gardner
- Dick Gregory
- Lawrence Guyot
- Leon Hall
- Fannie Lou Hamer
- Roy Harris
- Tony Heffernan
- Wendell Hoffman
- Hamilton E. Holmes
- Myles Horton
- William Bradford Huie
- Ruby Hurley
- Herbert Turner Jenkins
- Timothy Jenkins
- J. T. Johnson
- Mary Dora Jones
- Vivian Malone Jones
- Nicholas Katzenbach
- Lonnie King
- Martin Luther King Sr.
- John Lewis
- Everette Little
- Joseph Lowery
- Autherine Lucy
- Andrew Marrisett
- Yancy Martin
- Neil Maxwell
- Benjamin Mays
- Franklin McCain
- Chris McNair
- Amzie Moore
- Chuck Morgan
- Edgar Nixon
- Rosa Parks
- Eugene Patterson
- John Malcolm Patterson
- Robert B. Patterson
- Laurie Pritchett
- Bayard Rustin
- Rita Samuels
- Bobby Shelton
- Arthur Shores
- Fred Shuttlesworth
- Charles R. Sims
- Claude Sitton
- Sidney Smyer
- J. B. Stoner
- Tol Tepper
- Hank Thomas
- Hartman Turnbow
- Albert Turner
- Elbert Tuttle
- Richard Valeriani
- Nannie Washburn
- Sheyann Webb
- Hosea Williams
- Abraham Wood
- Andrew Young

== Reception ==
Columnist Anthony Lewis reviewed the book for the New York Times in October 1977. He summarized his personal reaction to the book as follows: "Every so often a book is so touching, so exhilarating that one laughs and murmurs and cries out while reading, wanting to tell others about it. My Soul Is Rested is like that." While discussing the impact of the book, he wrote: "Indeed, the power of My Soul Is Rested lies in part in its recalling for us what the South was like when the Movement started. Nowadays, when the problems of race relations are more complicated both morally and legally, too many people forget the cruelties that blacks have suffered in this country."

After the book was published Raines heard from friends in Atlanta and the American Southeast that they were having difficulties obtaining copies of the book. He later learned through Charles Haslam, president of the American Booksellers Association, that G.P. Putnam's regional salesman for the Southeast was making negative presentations of the book with racial overtones. Raines began to pursue the issue with Rich's department store, a major book distributor in Atlanta. Rich's chief book buyer, Faith Brunson, said that they would order only a few copies of the book because people were not interested in it except for Julian Bond and a few of those people. In a 1978 interview with Bill Cutler, Raines speculated that the buyers at Rich's may have held personal antipathy to the subject matter of the book, as one of the major sit-ins of the Civil Rights Movement had occurred at Rich's, which was then defending segregation.

== Sources ==
- Cutler, Bill (1978). "'My Soul Is Rested' Stirs Unrest in Marketing". Southern Changes, The Journal of the Southern Regional Council. Vol. 1, no. 2. pp. 16–18.
- Lewis, Anthony (23 October 1977). "The Right to Have a Coke". New York Times. p. BR2. ProQuest 121557492.
- Raines, Howell. My Soul is Rested: Movement Days in the Deep South Remembered. New York: G.P. Putnam's Sons, 1977.
