= Child labour in Canada =

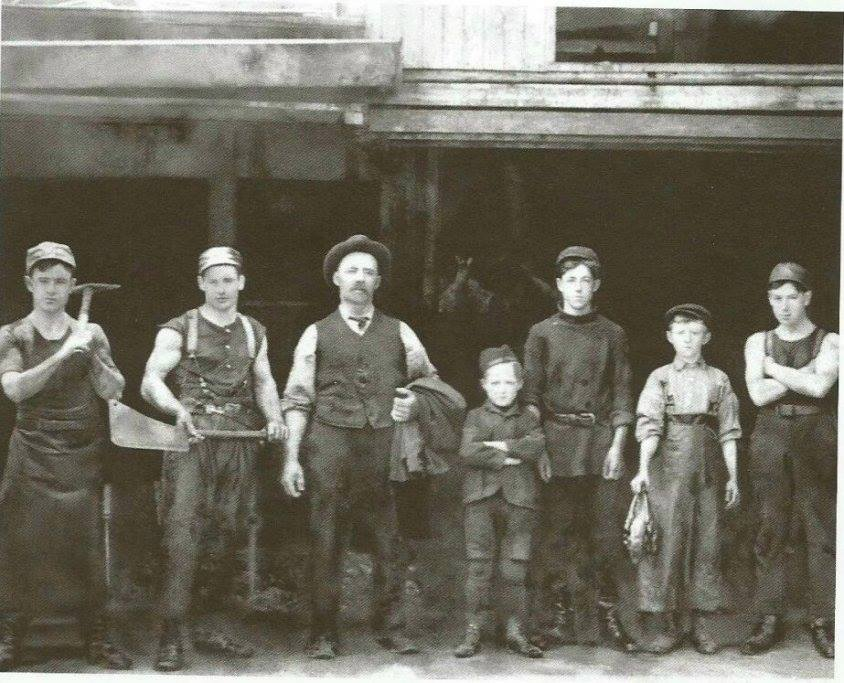
1890 photograph depicting boys working at a Quebec slaughterhouse.

Child labour was a historically common and socially acceptable practice across Canada. These attitudes have changed over time, which have led to increased regulation and decreased prevalence in contemporary Canadian society.

== History ==
In the 1700s, public perception towards child labour over the age of seven was favourable since it allowed children to contribute to their household's income. As public education became more readily available in the 1800s, less children were employed. Children living in urban areas were more likely to work in manufacturing or textile mills. These positions usually held little opportunity for advancement or adult employment, although some apprenticeships existed. Children were also cheaper to hire.

By the 1880s, public perception had shifted, with newspapers and other organizations campaigning against the employment of children under 14. An 1882 royal commission investigated the conditions of children working in mills and factories and prompted politicians to propose reformist legislation, before being withdrawn after disagreement over whether it was a provincial or federal matter and objections from businesses. In 1884, Ontario became the first province to create minimum age requirements for employment in factories. This legislation differed by the sex of the child: boys had to be at least 12, while girls had to be at least 14, and all children needed a signed certificate verifying their age from either their parents or a doctor.

Initial federal legislation against child labour focused on prohibiting it in specific contexts. By 1929, children had to be at least 14 years old to work in mines or a factory.

=== Chattel slavery ===
Before slavery was abolished in Canada, children born to enslaved women were slaves themselves. In 1793, the Act Against Slavery banned the importation of new slaves into British North America and manumitted those born into slavery once they turned 25 years old. Slaves born or purchased prior to that year were still considered slaves for life.

=== Home Children ===
In the 1860s, English protestant evangelicals were concerned about rapidly growing urban slums and the morality of the surrounding populace, which led to them establishing children's homes. These institutions quickly became overcrowded. As a result, people like Maria Rye, Annie Macpherson, and Thomas John Barnardo advocated for the mass emigration of children. Canada had a need for agriculture labourers and demand for home children exceeded supply. These children were also frequently used as indentured servants. More than 100,000 children emigrated to Canada throughout the duration of this child migration movement.

== Modern legislation ==
In 2016, Canada ratified the Minimum Age Convention.

In 2024, the Fighting Against Forced Labour and Child Labour in Supply Chains Act was enacted. The act has been criticized for being a "moderate and diluted version of previous stronger proposals" and "its establishment of reporting requirements without an effective due diligence component" regarding modern slavery.

== See also ==
- George Everitt Green
- Child labor in the United States
