= Walter Lowenfels =

American poet

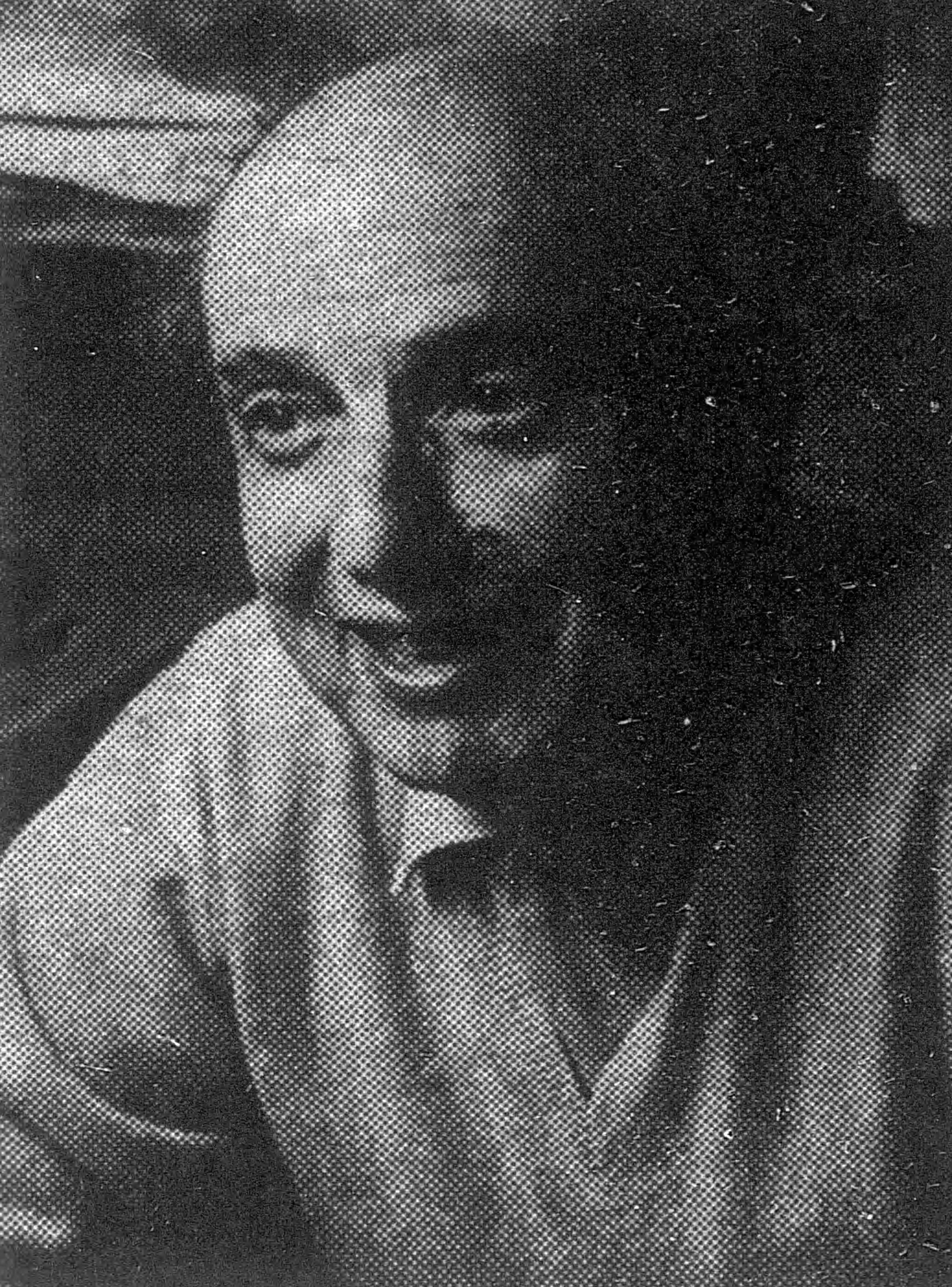
- Lowenfels c. 1969
- Born: May 10, 1897; New York, New York, U.S.
- Died: July 7, 1976 (aged 79); Tarrytown, New York, U.S.
- Occupations: Poet; journalist; editor
- Writing career
- Period: 1925–1975

Walter Lowenfels (May 10, 1897 – July 7, 1976) was an American poet, journalist, and member of the Communist Party USA. He also edited the Pennsylvania Edition of The Worker, a weekend edition of the Communist-sponsored Daily Worker.

== Early life ==
Lowenfels was born in New York City to a successful butter manufacturer on May 10, 1897. He graduated from a preparatory school in 1914, and served in the military during World War I, after which he began writing poetry. He worked for his father's company from 1914 until 1926. He met Lillian Apotheker, who later co-edited several of the anthologies of poetry he edited, in 1924, and the couple married in 1926. In 1925, with the financial assistance of Apotheker, he published his first collection of poems, Episodes & Epistles.

In 1926 he left the family business to hone his poetic craft in Europe, spending time in Florence and Paris. There he was exposed to the literary scene, meeting Henry Miller, T. S. Eliot, Ford Madox Ford, and other writers.

In 1930, while still in Paris, he co-founded Carrefour Press with Michael Fraenkel, which published the pamphlet Anonymous: The Need for Anonymity. The pamphlet was a manifesto declaring the need for anonymous publication in order to "avoid artistic competition and alienation."

In 1931 he shared the Richard Aldington Poetry Prize with E. E. Cummings.

Carrefour later anonymously published Lowenfels' play USA with Music, but was forced to reveal the identity of the playwright in 1932 when it filed a plagiarism suit against composer George Gershwin. Thereafter, the publishing house attributed its publications to their authors, effectively ending the anonymity movement. He continued to write and publish his poetry, which showcased his leftist political views, as well as editing the poetry of others. He also became concerned about the rise of fascism in Germany and Italy.

== Return to the United States ==
Lowenfels returned to the United States in 1934, settling in the Mays Landing section of Hamilton Township, Atlantic County, New Jersey, and went back to work for his father. He continued to write poetry at night. He wrote to Henry Miller about the transition from poet to businessperson: "I butter from nine to five and then I change into a butterfly and go ahead with poems."

In 1938, he published Steel 1937, which began with an open letter to Philip Murray, the CIO organizer behind the unionization drive at Little Steel. The poems in the book commemorated the 18 steelworkers killed by US Steel during the 1937 Little Steel Strike, and also discussed the Spanish Civil War. Following the publication of Steel 1937, Lowenfels quit writing poetry and would not resume for 17 years.

In 1938, Lowenfels moved to Philadelphia, Pennsylvania, where he became involved in the Civil Rights Movement and the struggles of working people. He began writing for and became the editor of the Pennsylvania edition of The Worker (weekend edition of the Daily Worker), a position he held until 1953. As a journalist and editor, his work focused on the lives of working people, especially African Americans. He was active in various causes, including the campaigns to free the Scottsboro Boys and Willie McGee, an African American veteran accused of rape in Laurel, Mississippi. (McGee was later executed.) He also supported striking coal miners, and campaigned to draft Franklin Roosevelt for a fourth presidential term.

During the early years of this period, he only worked half time for the paper, supplementing his income by selling intercommunication devices door-to-door. He later worked full-time for Daily Worker and the Pennsylvania Edition of The Worker, and his family's income depended heavily on his wife's public school teaching salary.

On Christmas Day, 1949, Lowenfels published an article in the Worker entitled "Santa Claus or Comrade X?," in which he mused about the "difficulties" of living with five women (his wife and four daughters) who spent their time washing, sewing and worrying about their clothes. The article was fiercely criticized by the paper's feminist readership, and the paper published several letters to the editor critical of the piece. Lowenfels' attempts to redeem himself in subsequent articles served only to anger his critics further, and the incident damaged his standing within the Party and the larger movement. The incident was examined as an example of efforts to confront male supremacy within progressive movements in a book by the historian Kate Weingard.

In about 1951, Lowenfels suffered a heart attack, from which he recovered. He purchased a cabin in rural Weymouth Township, New Jersey, where he and his wife took up residence.

== Trial ==
At 2 a.m. on July 29, 1953, the Federal Bureau of Investigation raided Lowenfels' cabin and arrested him. He was charged with conspiracy to overthrow the US government, a violation of the Smith Act. He was tried with five co-conspirators, a number that later grew to nine and also included Robert Klonsky. In a meeting of the accused to determine a defense strategy, it was agreed that Lowenfels' best contribution would be to continue writing poetry. During the trial, he also took up the translation of poetry by French and Italian authors. During this period, Lowenfels completed Sonnets of Love and Liberty, a work dedicated "to Peace, the loveliest prisoner of our time."

During the trial, the government never used his own writings as evidence against him. "[T]hey chose, rather, passages from State and Revolution, as interpreted by FBI Marxists." Lowenfels characterized the witnesses against him as "former communists who had become informers and agents for the FBI at a fair rate of pay". He and the co-conspirators were kept segregated from the general prison population in the maximum security division of Holmesburg Prison in Philadelphia. Nonetheless, due to his health, Lowenfels was often allowed to visit friends who lived near the courthouse, and even made a cross-country trip with Lillian during which he read poems publicly to raise money for his defense. He was convicted in 1954, but his conviction was overturned in higher courts shortly thereafter for lack of evidence.

== Later life ==
Following his release, Lowenfels stopped editing the Pennsylvania Worker and returned to writing poetry. He never suffered any repercussions from his community; he later wrote, "In our area, people seemed to put "overthrow the government" in the same category as moonshine or illegal deer."

He became best known as an anthologist of avant-garde poetry. He edited an anthology of Walt Whitman's poetry, but his most famous anthology was the 1967 Where is Vietnam?, a compilation of the poetic responses to the Vietnam War. He was active in the anti-Vietnam War peace movement, serving as the associate editor of the anti-war publication Dialog, In 1968, Lowenfels joined hundreds of well-known figures in the Writers and Editors War Tax Protest. Along with the other protest participants, Lowenfels publicly declared his intention to refuse to pay a new surtax intended to fund the Vietnam War.

In total, he wrote more than two dozen books of poetry. He also wrote an autobiography, My Many Lives, the second half of which is published in The Portable Walter, an anthology of his writings.

Lowenfels died in Tarrytown, New York. His papers are housed in the special collections department of the Olin Library, the main library of the Washington University in St. Louis, and the Beinecke Rare Book & Manuscript Library of Yale University.

== Bibliography ==
- Lowenfels, Walter (1925). Episodes & Epistles. Thomas Setzer.
- Wolfe, Humbert (1929). "prefatory note". Finale of Seem, a Lyrical Narrative. By Lowenfels, Walter. London: W. Heinemann. p. 92.
- Lowenfels, Walter (1930). Apollinaire: an Elegy. Hours Press.
- Lowenfels, Walter (1930). U.S.A. with Music, an Operatic Tragedy. Paris: Carrefour. p. 120.
- Lowenfels, Walter (1932). Elegy in the Manner of a Requiem in Memory of D.H. Lawrence. Paris: Carrefour. p. 33.
- Lowenfels, Walter (1934). The Suicide. Paris: Carrefour. p. 47.
- Lowenfels, Walter (1938). Steel, 1937. Atlantic City: Unity Publishers. p. 19.
- Lowenfels, Walter (1955). Sonnets of Love and Liberty. New York: Blue Herron Press. p. 63.
- Vítězslav Nezval, Paul Eluard, Nicholas Guillen, Horace, Tu Fu, M. Lukenin, Gabriela Mistral (1959). Song of Peace. Translated by Lowenfels. New York City: Roving Eye Press. p. 10.
- Lowenfels, Walter (1964). Poets of Today; a New American Anthology. prologue poem by Langston Hughes. New York City: International Publishers. p. 143.
- Lowenfels, Walter (1964). Some Deaths : Selected Poems & Communications, 1925-1962. Highlands, North Carolina: Nantahala Foundation. p. 109.
- Lowenfels, Walter (1964). To an Imaginary Daughter. New York City: Horizon Press. p. 128.
- Lowenfels, Walter (1965). Land of Roseberries. drawings by David Alfaro Siqueiros. Mexico City: El Corno Emplumado. p. 139.
- Lowenfels, Walter (1966). Translations from Scorpius. Monmouth, Maine: Poetry-Dimension Press. p. 28.
- Lowenfels, Walter (editor); co-edited by Nan Braymer (1967). Where is Vietnam? American poets respond; an anthology of contemporary poems. Garden City, New Jersey: Anchor Books. p. 160.
- Lowenfels, Walter (1969). In a Time of Revolution; Poems from our Third World. New York: Random House. p. 151.
- Lowenfels, Walter; Howard McCord (1970). The life of Fraenkel's Death; a Biographical Inquest. Pullman, Washington: Washington State University Press. p. 92.
- Lowenfels, Walter (1973). The Revolution Is to Be Human. New York City: International Publishers. p. 70. ISBN 0-7178-0395-3.
- Hernández, David (1973). "introductions". From the Belly of the Shark: a New Anthology of Native Americans; Poems by Chicanos, Eskimos, Hawaiians, Indians, Puerto Ricans in the U.S.A., with related poems by others. By Lowenfels, Walter (compiler). New York: Vintage Books. p. 352. ISBN 0-394-71836-4.
- Lowenfels, Walter (1974). Reality Prime; Pages from a Journal. Brooklyn: Cycle Press. p. 60. ISBN 0-914320-00-9.
- Lowenfels, Walter (1975). For Neruda, for Chile : an International Anthology (editor). Boston: Beacon Press. ISBN 0-8070-6382-7.
