= George Everitt Green =

Undated photograph of George Everitt Green

George Everitt Green (1880–1895) was a home child from London, England, who emigrated to Canada. His death prompted considerable publicity surrounding the living conditions of Home Children.

== Early life ==
Green's father Charlie was a tailor and his mother Amelia was a washerwoman. He had an older sister named Margaret and a younger brother named Walter. They all lived together in Tottenham until he was six years old, when their parents abandoned them. Afterwards, the children began to live at different boarding schools. During this period, their father died. Amelia returned for Margaret when she became 17 with the intention of making her a domestic worker, prompting the institution to force her to take all of her children back. Their mother had difficulties paying rent and she left George and Walter at one of Thomas John Barnardo's homes for children.

== Emigration to Canada ==
In 1895, Green and his brother were sent to Canada with more than 160 other boys. His admission documents described him as having poor vision in his left eye. He was originally given to a farmer in Norfolk County, Ontario, who returned him because his eyesight prevented him from performing certain agricultural tasks. His next placement was with a woman named Helen Findlay in Owen Sound, who also ran a farm. Green died seven months later. His death led to a manslaughter charge. According to the Dictionary of Canadian Biography, "neighbours reported that for several months they had observed the boy inadequately clothed and fed, forced by physical violence to do work beyond his strength, and made to sleep in the barn as punishment", although none of these neighbours interfered with her treatment of the child.

Green's death led to considerable press attention and eventually led to legislation restricting child immigration. Findlay's legal defence relied on eugenics-based arguments, claiming that the boy did not die from ill treatment but had instead inherited disease. After a second trial, Findlay's manslaughter charge was converted into common assault and she was sentenced to one year in prison.

== See also ==
- Child labour in Canada
