= Hyundai Alabama child labor allegations =

Corporate scandal in the United States

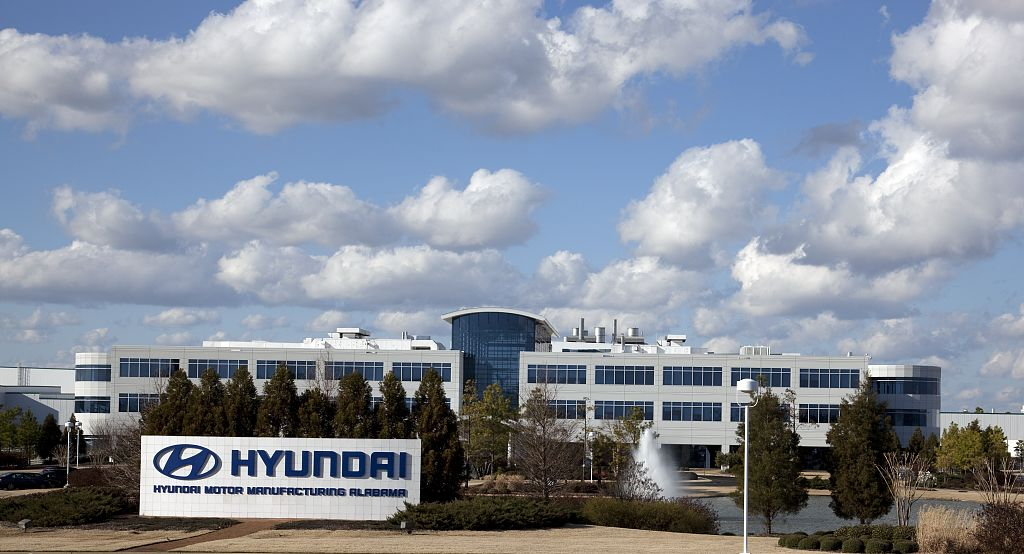
- Hyundai plant whose parts suppliers used child labor
- Date: 2022
- Location: Alabama
- Outcome: Fines totaling approx. $80,000
- Charges: Violating Fair Labor Standards Act and Alabama state child labor regulations

In 2022, car manufacturing company Hyundai and its parts suppliers in Alabama, U.S. were found to be illegally employing children to operate heavy equipment. Most of these children were refugees from Central America, some of whom were put to work against threat of deportation.

== Background ==
In 2005, Hyundai started manufacturing cars at a new plant in Alabama. Production is supported by a number of parts suppliers in Alabama, including SMART, which Hyundai owns. Other parts suppliers involved in the scandal include SL, Hwashin, and AJIN. Some workers at these parts suppliers were recruited by temporary work agencies, which reduced the liability of those suppliers to recruit laborers who are legally eligible to work.

== Incidents ==
In July 2022, Reuters reported that SMART, a Hyundai subsidiary in Luverne, Alabama, U.S.A. had hired minors as young as 12 years old to work in one of its metal stamping plants. The subsidiary supplies parts for Hyundai's nearby assembly plant in Montgomery. A former employee of SMART said that there were around 50 underage workers, some of which were children of Guatemalan migrants. The report was confirmed by "area police, the family of three underage workers, and eight former and current employees of the factory." In response, Hyundai said the company "does not tolerate illegal employment practices at any Hyundai entity" and that it is "unaware of any evidence of the allegations." SMART stated separately that it follows the law and denied knowingly employing "anyone who is ineligible for employment." It expects the temporary work agencies that fill its jobs to "follow the law in recruiting, hiring, and placing workers." State and federal labor laws limit minors younger than 18 from working in metal stamping and pressing jobs near dangerous machinery. Alabama also requires children 17 and under to be enrolled in school, which some of the underage workers had to forego in order to work long shifts at the plant. Following the report, a California Hyundai owner filed a class action lawsuit against Hyundai claiming that "defendants materially omit and fail to disclose that Class Vehicles are manufactured using child labor" and that Hyundai owners and lessees were harmed as a result.

On September 29, 2022, the U.S. Department of Labor fined SL Alabama, a division of Korean SL Corp, $30,076 for violating the Fair Labor Standards Act's child labor provisions, following an inspection on August 9, 2022. The consent decree, ordered by the U.S. District Court for the Middle District of Alabama, also prevents SL Alabama from shipping or delivering any goods produced using underage labor. It also requires training materials to be provided to employees and subcontractors to ensure compliance with child labor laws, quarterly trainings provided by a third party for three years, and sanctions on any management found responsible for violations. SL Alabama, which is based in Alexander City, supplied parts to Hyundai, as well as Kia. Separately, Alabama's state Department of Labor fined SL Alabama and JK USA Inc., its temporary labor recruiting firm, $17,800 each for a total of $35,600. Property records show that the house where some underage workers lived alongside other SL employees is owned by a company registered under the name of the president of the recruiting firm. However, because the underage workers were at companies who only produced parts for Hyundai and Kia's supply chain, neither department of labor accused Hyundai or Kia of any wrongdoing.

Regulators were first tipped off about child labor in Hyundai's supply chain by a school official in 2021, who told them that a child around 12 years old was working at the Hwashin plant in Greenville, Alabama. After the Reuters investigation into SMART, Hwashin fired all their underage workers in fear of an inspection. Another parts supplier, AJIN, employed more than 10 underage workers according to several employees, including one manager who was told to "focus on production" after reporting the violations to his higher ups. At SMART, over 20 boys and girls aged around 12 to 16 worked around heavy equipment, including operating forklifts and welding. After two incidents of teenage workers falling and injuring themselves, Carlos Herrera, an employee, said "[he] would tell them: this person shouldn't be working... but they didn't care." Herrera also alleges that Hyundai officials wearing Hyundai branded shirts visited the plant while children were working on the floor, saying that "it was obvious there were minors." Notes from the Office of Refugee Resettlement described how the underage workers experienced "exploitation from debt bondage (repaying smuggling debts)" and that "some children expressed fear of deportation based on comments made by company officials to them."

On November 22, 2022, inspectors from the state and federal departments of labor conducted a surprise inspection of a Hyundai Glovis warehouse in Montgomery. They found that a boy had been working at three different parts manufacturers from the age of 14, which resulted in the Alabama Department of Labor fining three separate staffing companies $5,050, the maximum state penalty for a child labor violation.

In February 2023, Hyundai entered talks with the Department of Labor to ensure compliance with child labor regulations. A group of 33 members of Congress, led by Democratic Michigan Congressman Dan Kildee, wrote to urge the Department of Labor to "take immediate action to rid Hyundai's supply chain of child labor." CEO Jae Hoon Chang announced to shareholders on February 24, 2023 that Hyundai would be divesting its controlling stake in SMART. This controversy, along with other instances of illegal child labor in meat packing plants, motivated a bipartisan group of lawmakers to introduce legislation to increase federal penalties for child labor law violations.
