= Robert Klonsky =

American political activist

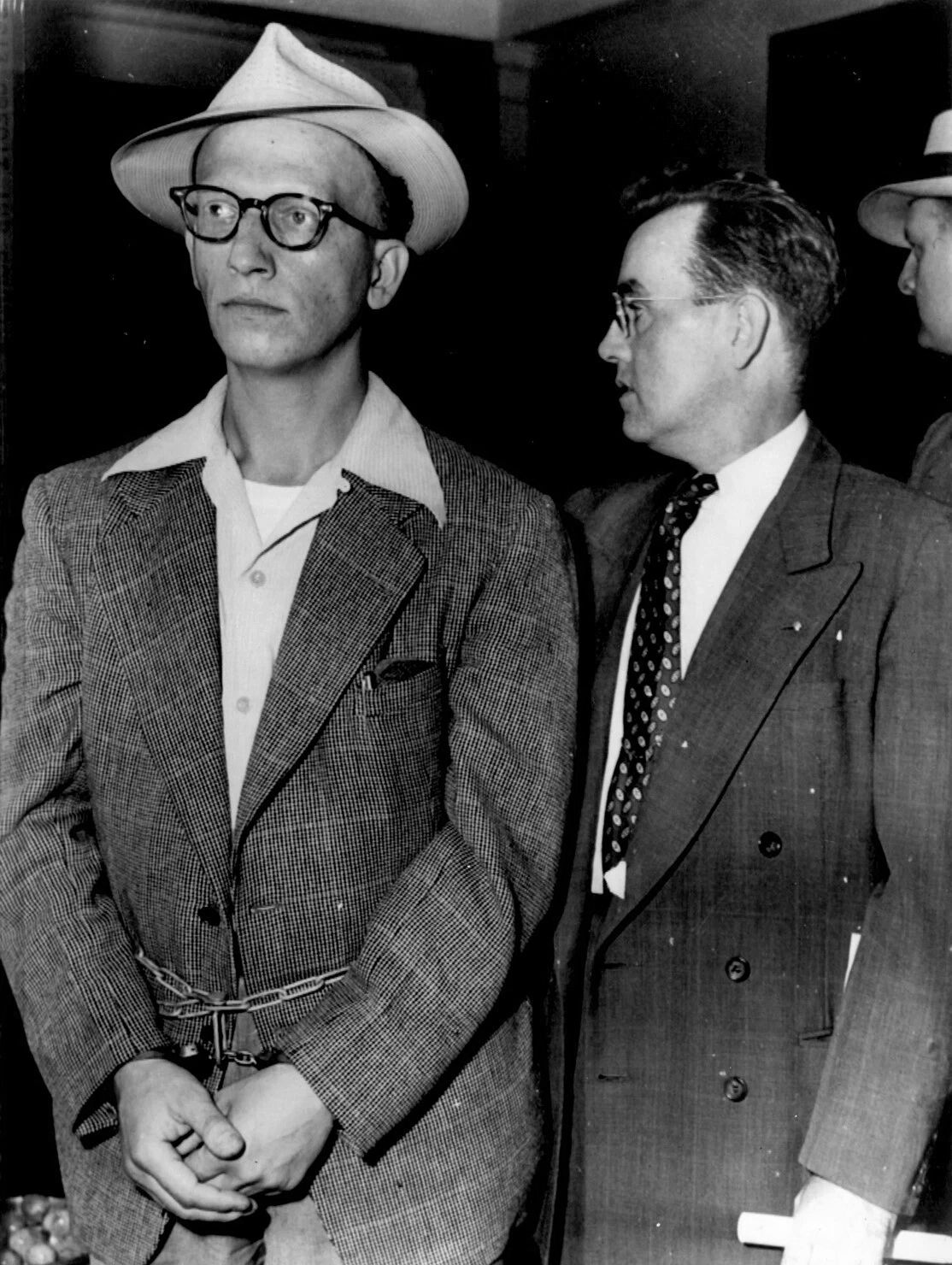
- Klonsky (left) following his arrest, 1953
- Born: March 12, 1918; Brooklyn, New York, United States of America
- Died: September 7, 2002 (aged 84); Chicago, Illinois, United States of America
- Spouse: Helen Wainer
- Children: Michael Klonsky and Fred Klonsky
- Military career
- Allegiance: Spanish Republic
- Branch: International Brigades
- Unit: The "Abraham Lincoln" XV International Brigade
- Conflicts: Spanish Civil War

Robert Klonsky (March 12, 1918 – September 7, 2002) was an American communist activist and member of the Abraham Lincoln Brigade, which fought on the side of the Spanish Republicans in the Spanish Civil War.

== Biography ==
Klonsky was born in 1918 in a house on Eastern Parkway in the Brownsville/East New York neighborhood of Brooklyn. His parents, Louis Klonsky and Bella or Becky (Beile Berezowska), were poor religious Jews who had emigrated from the Russian Empire. His father was a cantor from Minsk (now Belarus). Klonsky's brother Ben became the chief cantor of Reading, Pennsylvania, while his brother Mac became a Communist.

Klonsky and Walter Lowenfels were defendants in a trial in the mid-1950s of nine Philadelphia members of the Communist Party. They were convicted in 1954 of violating the Smith Act, which outlawed "teaching or advocating the overthrow of the American government by force". He served over a year at the federal penitentiary at Allenwood, Pennsylvania, before the Justice Department withdrew charges in 1958.

After 1958, Klonsky lived in California, where he ran a bookstore near UCLA and where he remained active in organizing workers in the film industry. His son, Michael Klonsky, also became active in politics, becoming a national secretary of the Students for a Democratic Society and later leader of the Communist Party (Marxist-Leninist). Robert Klonsky supported the jailed professor Angela Davis, demonstrated against the Vietnam War and had a few acting parts in movies. He and other survivors of the Spanish war were made honorary citizens of Spain in 1998.

Klonsky died on September 7, 2002, in Chicago at the age of 84. His ashes were scattered off the coast of Barcelona.
