= History of Guatemalan migrants in the United States =

Guatemalan migrants are the 10th largest migrant group in the United States of America., and the 3rd largest immigrant group from Central America. The 2015 American Community Survey estimates the Guatemalan American migrant population at 1,300,000, which is roughly 3% of the US foreign born population, and 0.4% of the total population of the United States. Of this group, the majority live in California, New York, Florida, and Texas. Roughly one quarter of Guatemalan Migrants reside in Anaheim County, California alone. A majority of these migrants are men; according to 2015 American Community Survey, roughly 57% of all Guatemalan Migrants are male. They also tend to be younger, with 86% falling between the ages of 18 and 65. In comparison, approximately 60% of the native born population and 80% of the foreign born population are in the same age range. Of the 650,000 (62.5%) Guatemalan migrants in the labor market, approximately one third are employed in the service sector.

== Migration trends ==
Figure 1. Guatemalan Foreign-Born Population in the United States, 1960-1990

Guatemalan migration predominantly began in the 1960s. This decade is historically important to migration, being that the U.S. had just transitioned into its expansionary period. The U.S. had enacted the Hart-Cellar Act in 1965 which established a new 20,000 migrant limit per-country with preference to family reunification. In 1990 the United States amended the Immigration Act, raising the number of admitted legal permanent residents from 500,000 to 700,000. This also meant that U.S. would no longer discriminate against countries of origin in regards to granting visas. In Figure 1, we see a steady increase in the Guatemalan foreign-born stock population in the U.S. between the decades of 1960–1990. This increase is understandable given the current progressive immigration law in the U.S. at the time and the fact that during 1960 and 1996 the Guatemalan Civil War was erupting.

=== Guatemalan Civil War ===
The intensification of the Guatemalan Civil War during the 1970s and 1980s led to an influx of tens of thousands of Guatemalan refugees into the United States via Mexico, via both legal and illegal means. Guatemalan refugees became an important political and economic influence on seeking an end to the civil war, which finally came about in 1996. They also organized to change policies of the Mexican government in dealing with Guatemalan immigrants' legal status, their experience in Mexico, and difficulties of Guatemalans in Mexico immigrating to the US.

During the Guatemalan civil war, there was massive destruction of rural villages and farmlands. In the 1996 peace accords, there was a free exchange of civilian land to favor the rise of corporate agribusinesses with the drop of prices of local agricultural products. This heavily affected farm workers and inhabitants of the countryside and they had to immigrate into the US through Mexican territory.

The civil war impacted many of the indigenous people and the trajectory of what led people to migrate out of Guatemala.

The peak statistic of Figure 1 is the foreign-born stock migrant increase from 1980 to 1990. This marks the largest Guatemalan migration. Migrant numbers go from 63,073 in 1980 to 225,739 in 1990. This is likely the result of political, social, and economic unrest caused by the Guatemalan Civil War raging during this period. This change over time may be a combination of the Immigration Act of 1990, along with the civil war circumstances taking place in Guatemala, causing many migrants to flee the country.

After September 11, 2001, Mexican officials made new laws through an initiative limiting immigration visas and other repressive measures on the southern Mexican border through Plan Sur, a binational treaty with the Guatemalan government.

== Driving forces for Migration ==
Many Central Americans like Hondurans, Salvadorians, and Guatemalans are trying to reach the United States for political asylum. The current driving forces leading to migration are crime, poverty and political corruption. Crime is a big issue for those living in Guatemala; statistically 84% to 87% of violence is attributed to gang violence and drug trafficking. Firearms are very easy to obtain in that country of Guatemala. In Central America, 73% of homicides are attributed to guns, which is 32% higher compared to a worldwide percentage of 41%. The other attribute leading to these migrations is poverty. Guatemala has a population of about 16.5 million people. From that 16.5 million, 59.3% of people live below the poverty line which is about 9,817,500 people, while 23% live in extreme poverty which is about 3,795,000 from the 89.3% of people. Climate change has been one of the largest contributing factor that has led to the dismantling of the Guatemalan economy. The Guatemalan economy especially that of the western highlands is based on its coffee industry which has been altered by climate change and “coffee rust” fungus, the crippling of the economy further cripples the families in these already impoverished communities which have relied on the coffee industry for generations, which has dropped 6% since last year. Since 2014 95% of Guatemalans have been affected by droughts. These droughts reduced the agricultural production in both commercial as well as subsistence farming. Both leading to the distributing statistic of poverty and child malnutrition. Long history of civil war, genocide, and US intervention has all left its imprint on the current political environment of the country.

== Migration today ==
The graph below shows that a majority of the granted citizenship for Guatemalans in 2016 was due in large part from family members. The United States Citizenship and Immigration Services website says if you are a United States citizen, you are eligible to petition a family member to receive a Green Card (permanent residence). The petition can be for immediate family members only, such as a child, spouse or parent. Here we can see that a total of 6,295 out of 13,002 individuals came based on immediate relatives of U.S. citizens. That is 48.5% of the granted total, making it one of the highest percentages for a specific broad class.

LAWFUL PERMANENT RESIDENT STATUS BY BROAD CLASS OF ADMISSION FISCAL YEAR 2016
Country of Birth	Family sponsored	Employment based	Immediate relatives of U.S. citizens	Diversity	Refugees and asylees	Other	Total
Guatemala	2,438	1,530	6,295	13	1,162	1,564	13,002
Percent	18.7%	11.7%	48.5%	0.1%	9.0%	12.0%	100%

Source: U.S. Department of Homeland Security

=== Caravana De Migrantes 2017-2018 ===
In October 2017 a caravan of Central Americans started their 1,200 mile journey to the U.S. border. The journey started in Honduras, sweeping through Guatemala and pushing through the Guatemalan and Mexican border and eventually the Mexican and U.S. border. Many are seeking political asylum status as refugees. Many people in the caravan were treated by the red cross for dehydration, blisters and other maladies. In total Mexico received 14,596 claims in 2017 for political asylum. In October 2018, Mexico received 1,699 requests for refugee status including children. At the U.S. border 42,757 Guatemalans traveling in families were either apprehended or otherwise stopped at the border. The U.S. is legally obligated to consider the cases of asylum seekers. The credible fear and reasonable fear screening processes are available to asylum seekers in expedited removal processes. Some of the people while waiting for the application to be filled can live in the U.S. while others may be detained. This is the risk of those migrating.
