= Atlanta Community Relations Commission =

Community commission in Atlanta, Georgia, USA

The Atlanta Community Relations Commission (ACRC) was a community action group created in November 1966 by the City of Atlanta. The group was charged with investigating discrimination and race relations in Atlanta, reporting recommendations to the Mayor of Atlanta to improve relations in the city. The group served as a direct liaison between city hall and groups in the Atlanta community, and they held regular town halls to "hear residents’ concerns, take them to city officials and departments, returning to each neighborhood thirty days later to report on actions taken, thereby creating continuous discussions where residents’ saw results from their voiced concerns". Although Atlanta had developed a reputation as "the city too busy to hate," that reputation was often fostered by people who would benefit from it. The commission addressed wide-ranging instances of discrimination, from school desegregation to trailer camps. The Commission's first LGBT representative was appointed in June 1972.
