= Packers Sanitation Services illegal employment of children =

Slaughterhouse cleaning in the United States

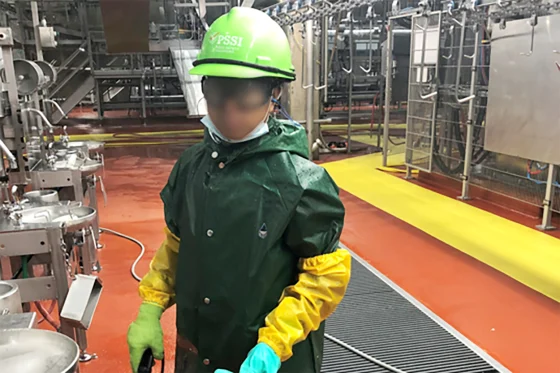
Photo of a minor cleaning a slaughterhouse in Grand Island, Nebraska.

A 2022 investigation by the U.S. Department of Labor showed that more than 100 children had been illegally employed by Packers Sanitation Services Inc (PSSI), a slaughterhouse cleaning firm owned by Blackstone Inc., an American alternative investment management company, across the United States. According to the U.S. Department of Labor, a federal investigation discovered that Wisconsin-based PSSI hired at minimum 102 children aged 13 to 17 to perform nighttime shifts at 13 meat production sites in eight states. During the examination, it was found that children were using dangerous chemicals to clean meat-processing tools, including head splitters, brisket saws, and back saws. As a result, PSSI was charged $15,138 by the Department of Labor for each child, summing to a total of $1.5 million.

== Background ==
There was a 37% rise in child labor law breaches across the U.S. during the fiscal year 2022, with at least 688 children working in hazardous situations. By federal labor law, children under 18 are not permitted to work in meatpacking factories, and children are not permitted to work after 9 p.m. during the summer and 7 p.m. during the school year. Republican lawmakers throughout the U.S. have recently pushed for the expansion of the types of approved job as well as work hours, although the Department of Labor has raised concerns over the increase in child labor violations since 2015.

== Investigations ==
The U.S. Labor Department investigations discovered that at least three minors had sustained injuries while working for the PSSI. According to the Labor Department, the minors PSSI employed had worked at facilities run by significant meat producers, including Tyson Foods. According to Jessica Looman, the principal deputy administrator of the department's wage and hour division, "The child labor violations in this case were systemic and reached across eight states, and clearly indicate a corporate-wide failure by Packers Sanitation Services at all levels." According to the lawsuit, most of the children who worked at the three companies could not speak English fluently and had to be interviewed in Spanish, but it was unclear if they were immigrants. According to a Labor Department official, the department did not check the children's immigration status.

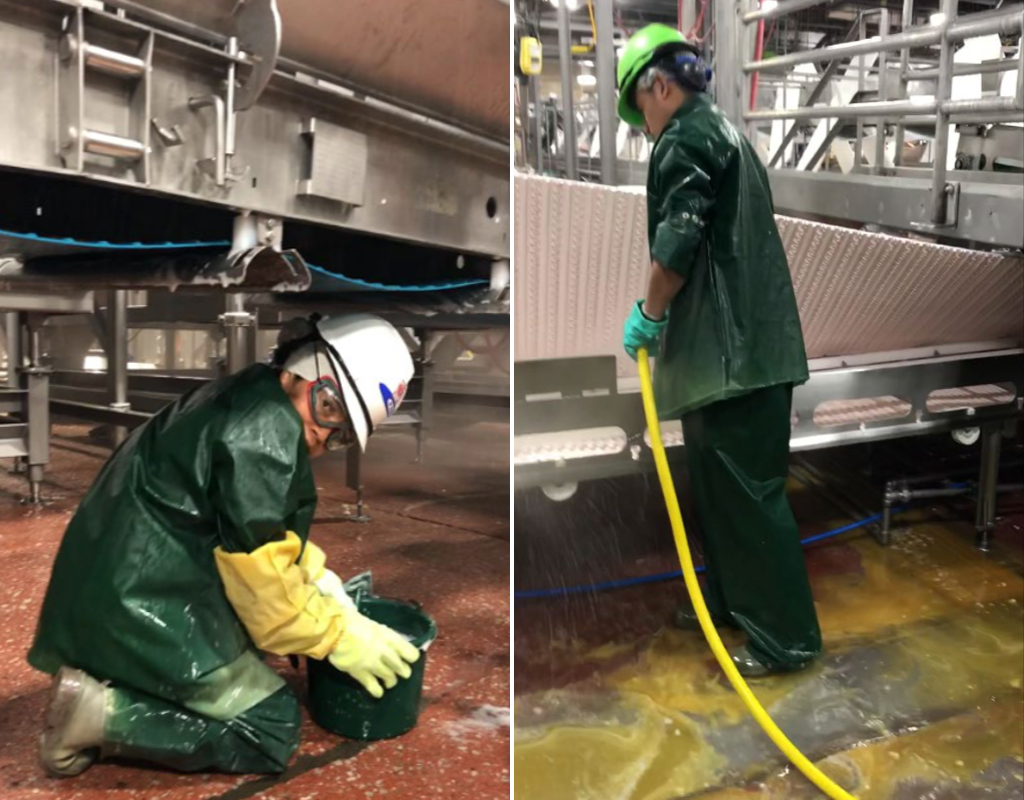
Photos of a minor cleaning at a meat packaging plant in Nebraska

A child aged 14 who worked at a Nebraska facility from 11 p.m. to 5 a.m. five to six days a week from December 2021 to April 2022 cleaned machinery "used to cut meat," according to court filings. Based on the department, school records revealed that the child missed or fell asleep in class due to working at the company. Reports of injuries to child laborers at a PSSI-owned slaughterhouse in Grand Island date back to 2016. Local school officials noted that it was "common knowledge" that children were working overnight shifts there; one nonprofit group in the state noted that the families of many of the children had immigrated from countries where child labor was more commonplace.

According to the PSSI website, the company has more than 16,500 employees and contracts with hundreds of slaughter and meatpacking facilities countrywide. The contracts Packers had with JBS USA operations in Nebraska and Minnesota, with 27 children, as well as a Cargill Inc. factory in Kansas, with 26 children, were the cause of the largest fines imposed on the company. Tyson Food, George's Inc, Buckhead Meat of Minnesota, Gibbon Packing Co, Greater Omaha Packing Co Inc, Maple Leaf Farms, and Turkey Valley Farms are among the other processors that hired children. The Labor Department made no accusations of wrongdoing against JBS (JBSS3.SA), Cargill, or any other meatpackers.

=== Fine ===
Under the Fair Labor Standards Act, PSSI was charged $15,138 by the Department of Labor for each minor-aged employee who was employed in breach of the law. PSSI has paid $1.5 million in civil money penalties, as stated in the press release. The monetary penalties were criticized by economic researchers as "woefully insufficient" to deter companies in the meatpacking industry from hiring children again in the future.

=== Aftermath ===
In January 2025, PSSI rebranded under the new name of Fortrex.
