= Communist Party (Marxist–Leninist) (United States) =

Communist Party (Marxist-Leninist)
- Leader: Michael Klonsky
- Founded: 4 June 1977
- Dissolved: 1982
- Preceded by: October League (Marxist–Leninist)
- Youth wing: Communist Youth Organization
- Ideology: New Communist Movement; Maoism; Anti-Revisionism
- Political position: Far-left

The Communist Party (Marxist–Leninist) was a Maoist political party in the United States.

== History ==
=== The October League ===
The Communist Party (Marxist–Leninist)'s predecessor organization, the October League (Marxist–Leninist), was founded in 1971 by several local groups, many of which had grown out of the radical student organization Students for a Democratic Society when SDS split apart in 1969. Michael Klonsky, who had been a national leader in SDS in the late 1960s, was the main leader of the CP(M-L).

The October League came out of the Revolutionary Youth Movement II grouping in the SDS split. During the early 1970s the OL took positions that were at odds with most of the US Left, including opposition to gay liberation and support of the shah of Iran, whose regime they saw as a bulwark against Soviet social-imperialism.

In 1972, the OL supported a 7-week long wildcat strike at the Mead packaging plant in Atlanta, Georgia. It was led by a collective of predominantly black workers who were striking against racism, sexism, and unsafe working conditions at the plant. Ultimately, the strikers were successful in making Mead management concede to some of their demands. Later that same year, OL created a film documenting the strike called Wildcat at Mead.

In late 1975, it organized a "National Fight Back Conference", which drew 1,000 participants and was attended by representatives of the August 29th Movement, the Congress of Afrikan People and the Marxist–Leninist Organizing Committee of San Francisco. They also had a youth group called the Communist Youth Organization.

=== The Communist Party (Marxist–Leninist) ===
In June 1977, the October League transformed itself into the Communist Party (Marxist–Leninist), with Klonsky as chairman and Eileen Klehr as vice-chairman.

The CP (ML) supported the Chinese government's purge of the Gang of Four. It was subsequently recognized by the Chinese Communist Party as its de facto fraternal party in the US. Klonsky and Klehr visited Peking in July 1977 and met with Hua Guofeng. Longtime Black communist Harry Haywood, who had become a CP(M-L) member, also visited with Chinese leaders in June 1978.

In 1978, Daniel Burstein, the editor of the CP (ML) central organ The Call, and three others made an eight-day tour of Khmer Rouge-ruled Cambodia, then a Chinese ally. He visited Phnom Penh as well as Siem Reap, Kompong Thom, Kompong Cham and Takéo provinces and had an interview with Ieng Sary. In an op-ed he wrote in The New York Times he claimed that there was no evidence of genocide, claiming that that was part of a propaganda campaign orchestrated by the regime's enemies. He did concede, however:

The new government has had to deal with many forces that oppose the revolution—former Lon Nol officials, as well as organized networks of American, Russian and Vietnamese agents trying to overthrow the Government. Such sabotage has undoubtedly been met with violent suppression. In the course of this, there may even have been some excesses, which no revolution is immune to.

In early 1980, the CP (ML) condemned the Soviet invasion of Afghanistan and called on President Carter to give aid to the Afghan forces opposing the Soviets, end its arms embargo on China and refrain from selling the USSR any "strategic materials".

The CP (ML) also claimed the Mariel exodus was evidence that the USSR and Fidel Castro had "betrayed" the Cuban Revolution.

== See also ==
- List of anti-revisionist groups
