= Michael Klonsky =

American educator and activist

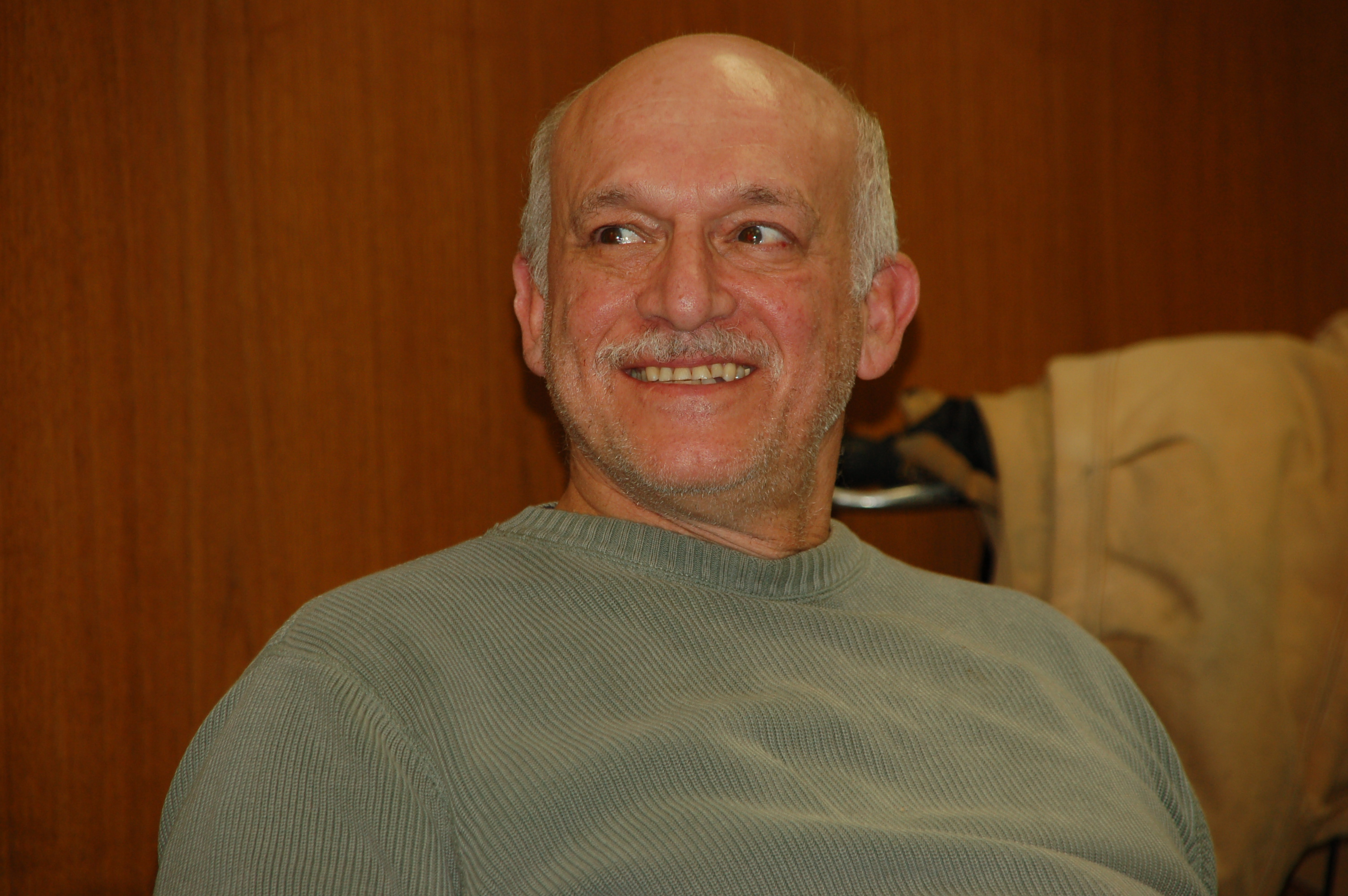
- Mike Klonsky speaking at Loyola University, Chicago, 2007
- Born: May 25, 1943 (age 83)
- Political party: Communist Party (Marxist–Leninist)
- Father: Robert Klonsky

Michael "Mike" Klonsky (born 1943) is an American educator, author, and political activist. He is known for his work with the Students for a Democratic Society, the New Communist Movement, and, later, the small schools movement.

== Political activism ==
Klonsky's father, Robert Klonsky, a World War II veteran who had fought as a volunteer against the Nationalists during the Spanish Civil War, had been arrested and convicted of "conspiring to advocate Marxist views" in violation of the Smith Act during the McCarthy period. The Supreme Court later overturned the case.

In the late 1960s Klonsky became the national secretary of the Students for a Democratic Society, which he joined as a student at San Fernando Valley State College (now California State University, Northridge). He was one of five S.D.S. members arrested on May 12, 1969, when "anonymous false reports of fire and a shooting" sent police and firefighters to the S.D.S. offices in Chicago.

In the 1970s he became a leader of the New Communist Movement which broke with the older Communist Party USA and its allegiance to the Soviet Union. He headed the Communist Party (Marxist–Leninist), in which role he was one of the first U.S. political activists to visit the People's Republic of China. Klonsky later became critical of Marxist dogma but stayed active in civil rights, anti-war and educational reform politics.

== Education research ==
Klonsky became one of the leaders of the modern small schools movement. His academic work focused on small school size as a solution to the problems of inner city schools; his early research on issues of school size and its impact on student achievement, school violence, and dropout rates, helped pave the way towards the development of thousands of new small and charter schools across the country. By 1996, he was the director of the Small Schools Workshop at the University of Illinois, Chicago, and in 1999, he was named by president Bill Clinton to the Academic Advisory Council of the National Campaign Against Youth Violence, where he advocated small schools as a mechanism for violence reduction. Klonsky is now a retired professor of education after teaching at several universities, including UIC and the Fischler School of Education at Nova Southeastern University.
