= G.I. movement =

Movement within the United States military during the Vietnam War

- Part of the Opposition to U.S. involvement in Vietnam
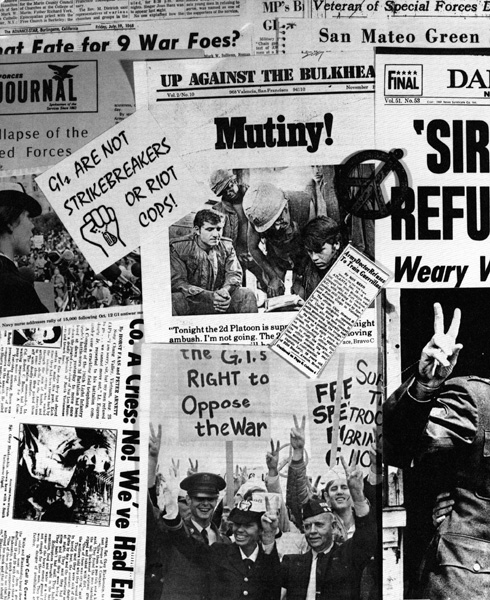
- Publications from the GI movement, taken from the book A Matter of Conscience.
- Date: 1965–1973
- Caused by: United States Involvement in the Vietnam War
- Goals: Avoid military duties in the Vietnam War
- Methods: Combat refusals; Open and covert resistance; Desertion; GI Underground Press; Fragging; GI coffeehouses
- Result: Disruption of military operations; Lowered military morale

The G.I. movement was the resistance to military involvement in the Vietnam War from active duty soldiers in the United States military. Within the military popular forms of resistance included combat refusals, fragging, and desertion. By the end of the war at least 450 officers were killed in fraggings, or about 250 from 1969–1971, over 300 refused to engage in combat and approximately 50,000 American servicemen deserted. Along with resistance inside the U.S. military, civilians opened up various G.I. coffeehouses near military bases where civilians could meet with soldiers and could discuss and cooperate in the anti-war movement.

== History ==
=== Early movement (1965–1967) ===
The early period of soldier resistance to the Vietnam War involved mainly individual acts of resistance. Some well publicized incidents occurred in this period. The first incident was in November 1965 when Lt. Henry H. Howe, Jr was court martialed for legally participating in an antiwar demonstration, while off-duty and out of uniform, in El Paso. In 1966, another incident occurred where three soldiers in Fort Hood refused deployment to Vietnam and were reprimanded, gaining the attention of anti-war activists. Later Capt. Howard Levy, a dermatologist, was punished for refusing to train Green Beret medics being sent to Vietnam.

=== Growing protests (1968) ===
In 1968 more collective acts of resistance would take place inside the U.S. military. Many servicemen fled the military and took sanctuary in various churches and universities. Many veterans and servicemen began involving themselves in anti-war marches, and rebellions in military stockades.

At the Presidio of San Francisco a protest was staged by servicemen after another soldier was shot for walking away from a work detail. During the protest a group of AWOL soldiers returned to base to join the demonstration. They were arrested and put into the stockade where they convinced other imprisoned troops to stage another protest.

=== Later dissent (1969–1973) ===
Demonstrations inside and outside the army were being conducted by servicemen. More dissident soldiers began to oppose racism felt in the United States, its military, and draft policy. By June 1971, Colonel Robert Heinl declared that the army in Vietnam was "dispirited where not near mutinous" in an article in Armed Forces Journal.

== Activist organizations ==
=== Civilian assistance organizations ===
- Beheiren

=== Deserters' and veterans' organizations ===
- American Deserters Committee
- Vietnam Veterans Against the War

=== Servicemen's organizations ===
- American Servicemen's Union
- Concerned Officers Movement
- GI's Against Fascism
- Movement for a Democratic Military
- Stop Our Ship (SOS)

== Gallery ==
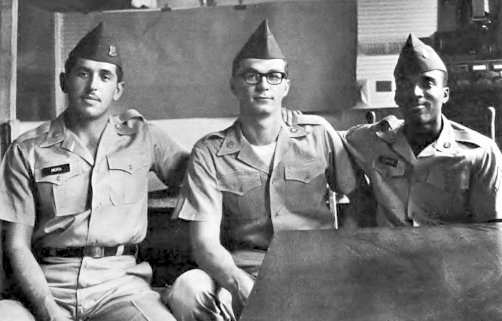
The Fort Hood Three refuse orders to go to Vietnam in 1966.

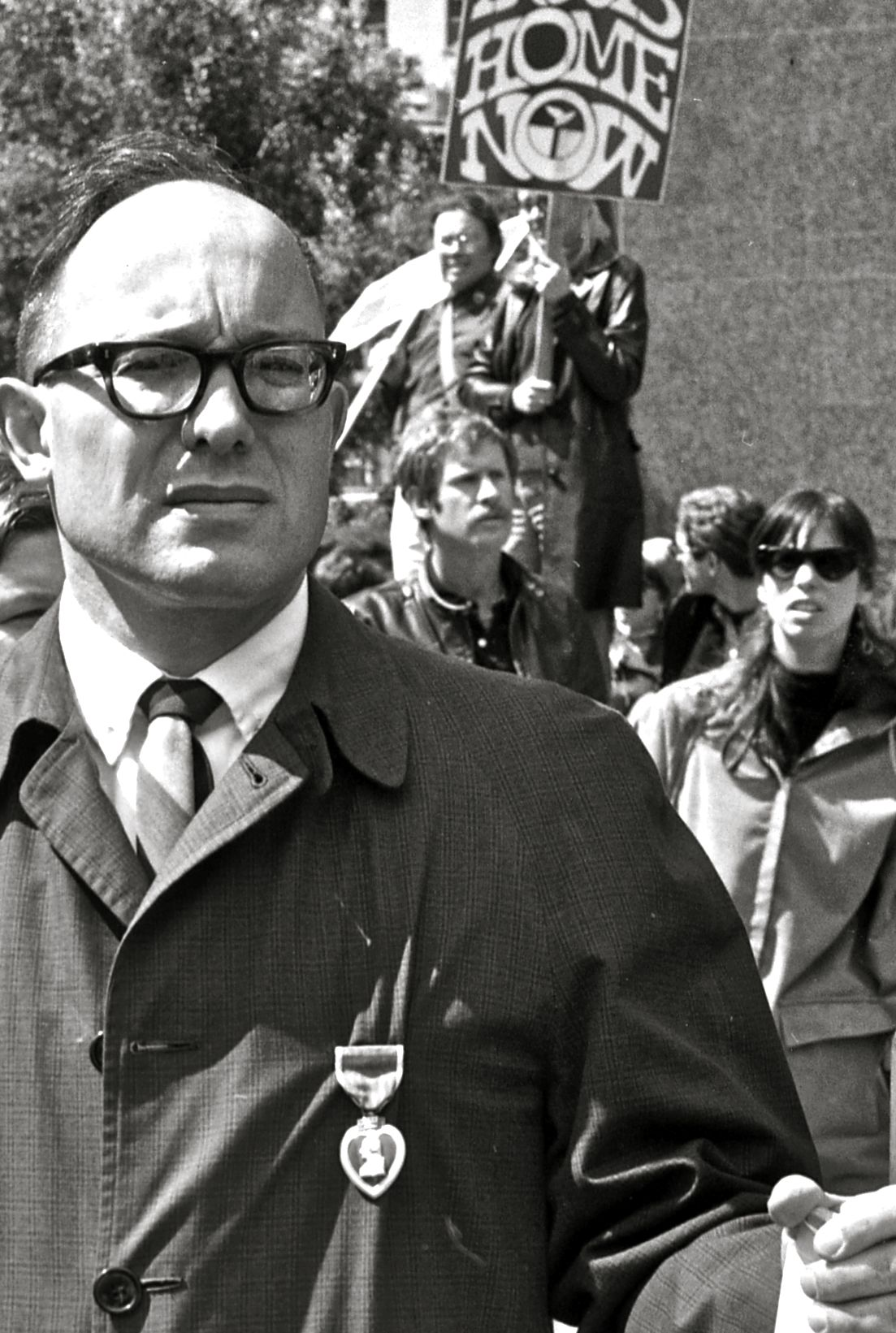
Protester with a Purple Heart.

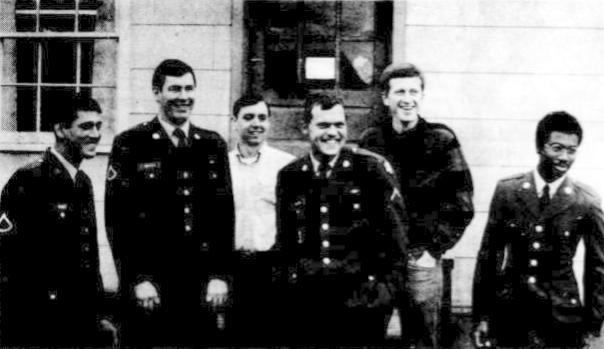
Fort Lewis Six who refused orders to go to Vietnam in 1970.

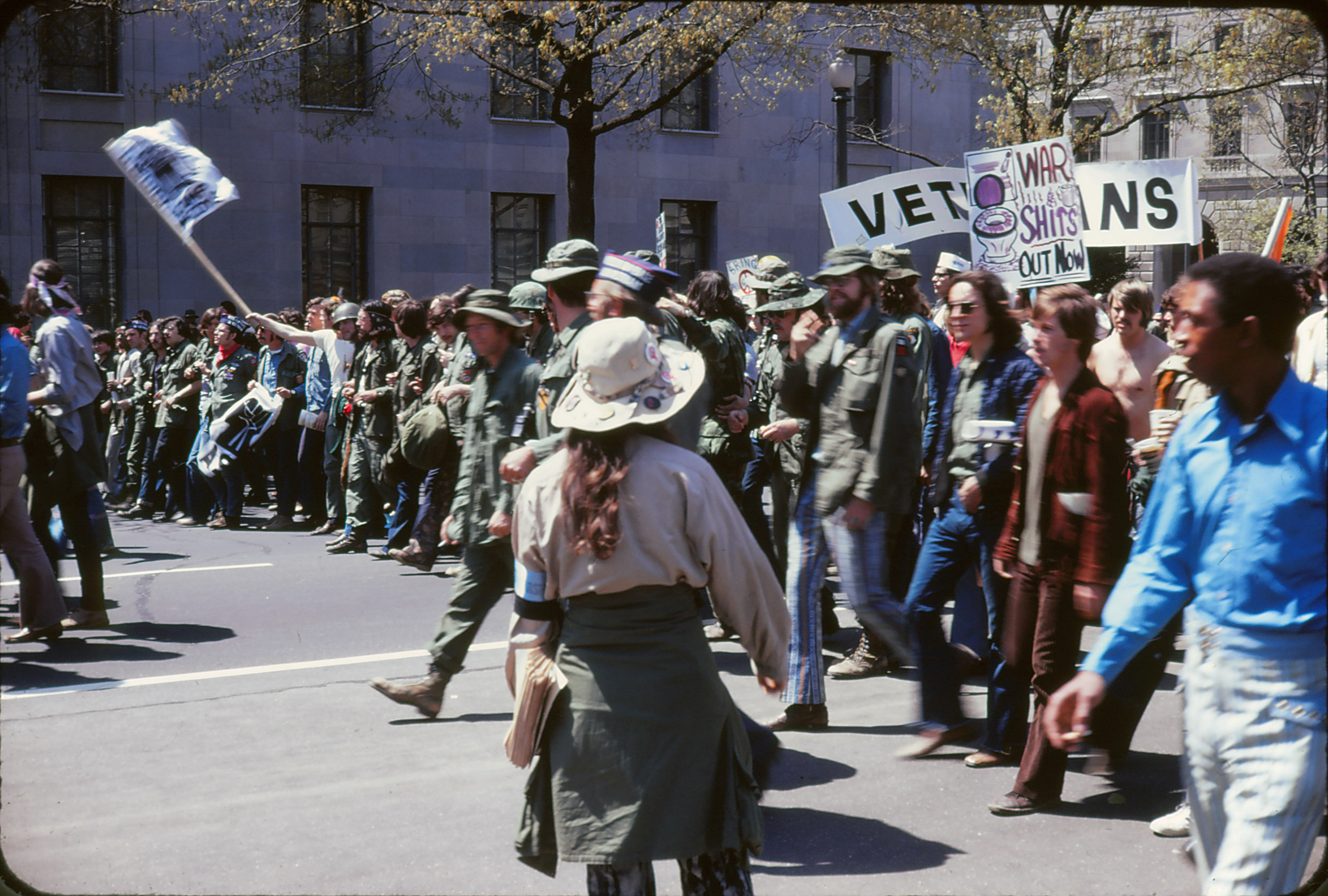
Veterans protesting the Vietnam War.

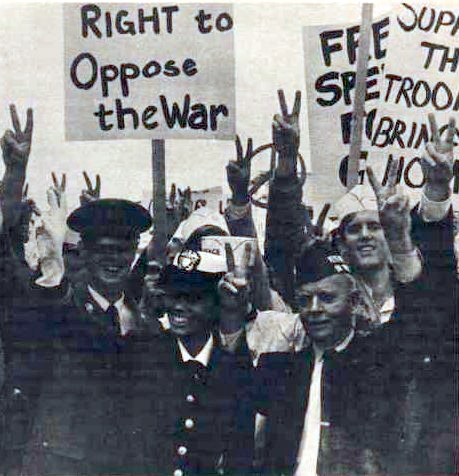
GIs and Veterans in peace march.

Flyer for GIs and Veterans protest.

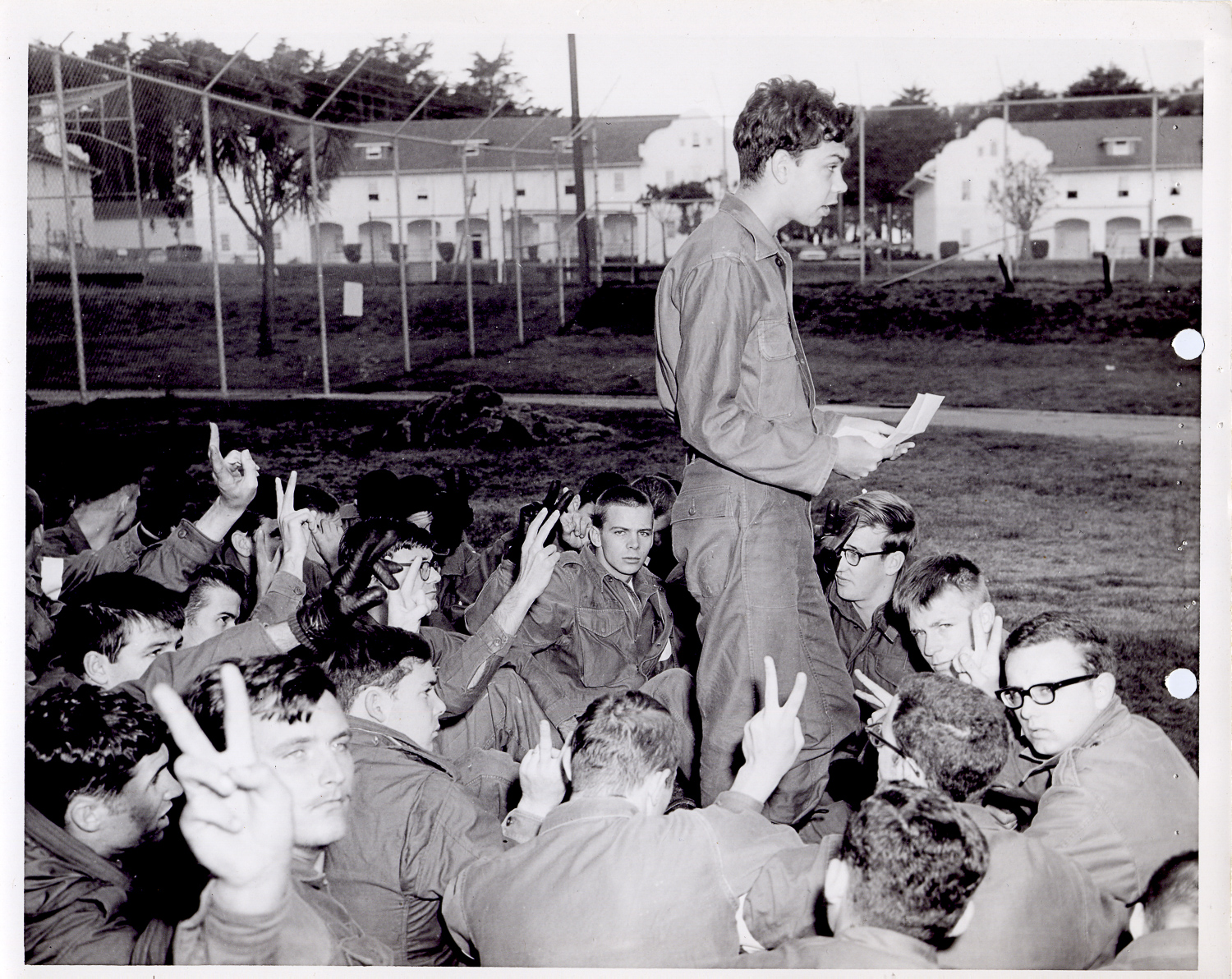
The Presidio 27 sit-down protest in 1968.

== See also ==
- A Matter of Conscience
- Brian Willson
- Concerned Officers Movement
- Court-martial of Howard Levy
- Donald W. Duncan, Master Sergeant U.S. Army Special Forces early register to the Vietnam War
- Fort Hood Three
- FTA Show
- GI's Against Fascism
- G.I. coffeehouses
- GI Underground Press
- Movement for a Democratic Military
- Presidio mutiny
- Resistance Inside the Army
- Opposition to United States involvement in the Vietnam War
- Sir! No Sir!, a documentary about the anti-war movement within the ranks of the United States Armed Forces
- Veterans For Peace
- Vietnam Veterans Against the War
- Waging Peace in Vietnam
- Winter Soldier Investigation
- Dissent by military officers and enlisted personnel
- Ronald L. Haeberle
- Soldiers in Revolt: GI Resistance During the Vietnam War
