= Fort Hood 43 =

One of the largest acts of civil disobedience by members of the U.S. military

After Martin Luther King Jr. was assassinated on April 4, 1968, U.S. troops stationed at Fort Hood in Killeen, Texas, were sent to Chicago, Illinois for riot control duty. While no official death toll was ever released, at least six Black young men were shot, "presumably by the police". A few months later, thousands of soldiers stationed at Fort Hood were being prepared again for "posible employment in civil disturbance control duty" at the Democratic National Convention in Chicago. A large number of Black soldiers at the base were concerned about racism within the military and the possibility they might be used against civilians in Chicago. On the evening of Friday, August 23, after receiving orders to Chicago, over one hundred "from the 1st Armored Cavalry Division" met on the base to discuss the situation. At around midnight, sixty troops staged a nonviolent sit-in at a major intersection on the base. They continued to discuss their concerns, drew up a list of grievances, and debated "whether they should refuse orders to deploy to Chicago." Private Guy Smith, a Vietnam combat veteran, described the mood of the gathering, "A lot of the black GIs knew what the thing was going to be about and they weren't going to go and fight their own people." At 5 a.m. Saturday morning, the division commander, Maj. Gen. John C. Boles Jr., and members of his staff met with the protesters and discussed their grievances. Time magazine described the General "pleading with the recalcitrant troopers," resulting in seventeen of them returning to their barracks. But forty-three continued the protest:

rather than risk having to oppose soul brothers with bayonets and gas grenades, they were determined to flout their orders and face punishment by military courts.

The General then left, promising to talk to his superior officers and return with an answer in the morning. The 43 soldiers relaxed, many falling asleep. In an interview in the documentary film Sir! No Sir! many years later, Elder Halim Gullahbemi, one of the 43 said, "All of a sudden, crack upside the head." He went on to describe the Military Police (MPs) coming at them with bayonets and rifle butts swinging. In the film he displays the scar from where he was cut by a bayonet. He told how the MPs, after surrounding them, would randomly grab one and "take him back in the back, and beat the shit out of him." An official military spokesman at Fort Hood described it differently, they "were escorted by the Military Police to the post stockade."

The protesting soldiers became known as the "Fort Hood 43", and their refusal to deploy to Chicago for riot-control duties "remains one of the largest acts of civil disobedience ever conducted by members of the American military." Their protest became widely known and the resulting courts-martial were reported nationally in the press. The NAACP helped with their defense and the Army's Special Civil Disturbance Board "worried that these soldiers' actions presaged further such resistance." They were also championed by one of the early antiwar GI Coffeehouses, The Oleo Strut, which supported the arrested soldiers and helped with their legal defense. Eventually, only 29 were convicted and "given relatively light sentences." The GI underground newspaper FTA: Fun Travel Adventure captured the sentiment of many GIs with its comment on the outcome: "No one was looking for any justice at the trial. If there was any justice for the enlisted men, there would have been no trial at all."

== See also ==
- Fort Hood Three - Three U.S. Army soldiers who refused to deploy to Vietnam in 1966.
- Fort Lewis Six - Six U.S. Army enlisted men courts-martialed for refusing orders to Vietnam in June 1970.
- GI Underground Press - Military press produced without official approval or acceptance during the Vietnam War.
- Intrepid Four - U.S. Sailors who deserted to oppose the Vietnam War.
- Opposition to United States involvement in the Vietnam War
- Presidio mutiny - Early instance of internal military resistance to the Vietnam War.
- Sir! No Sir! - a documentary about the anti-war movement within the ranks of the United States Armed Forces.
- Soldiers in Revolt: GI Resistance During the Vietnam War - book about soldier & sailor resistance during the Vietnam War.
- USS Sumter Three - Marines charged with "mutiny" on the USS Sumter.
