= USS Sumter Three =

Marines charged with mutiny on the USS Sumter

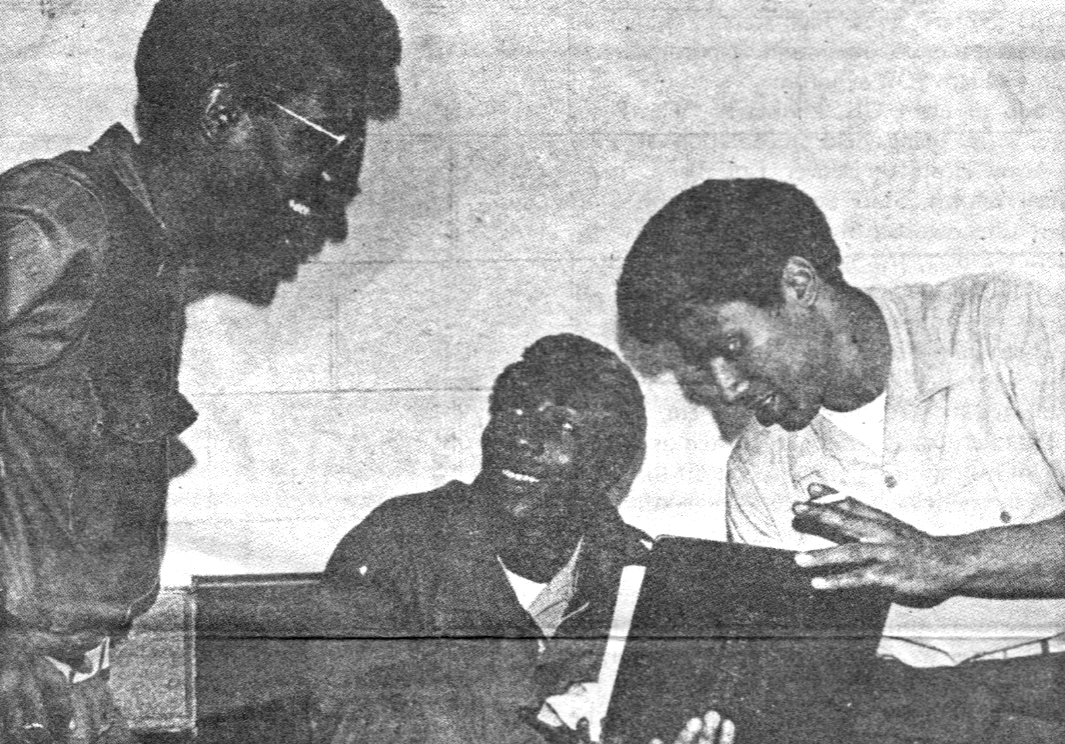
The Sumter Three - Jenkins, Barnwell and Blackwell in Camp Hensen Courtroom, Okinawa

In late August and early September 1972, a series of incidents on board the USS Sumter (LST-1181) off the coast of Vietnam resulted in three Black marines being charged with three counts of mutiny and eleven counts of assault, with the possibility of execution. This was "the first time since the US Civil War that American sailors or Marines had been charged with mutiny at sea".

The event that led to the arrests was a song played over the ship's radio station. Private First Class (PFC) Alexander Jenkins Jr., a 19-year-old Black marine in his role as the ship's DJ, decided to play a song by a Black artist that was popular among Black Americans at the time. The normal shipboard radio fare, which broadcast to the hundreds of sailors and marines on board, had up to this time been mainly popular white artists. As Jenkins recalled years later, "playing 'White Man’s Got a God Complex' by The Last Poets really set the white guys off." During the following days, an increasing number of disagreements and fistfights broke out between white and Black sailors and marines on board, with "some started by whites, others by Blacks."

Three Black marines were singled out as the "ringleaders", transported by helicopter to a military base in Da Nang and charged with mutiny, as well as assault, riot, and resisting arrest. The charges were so extreme that one GI underground newspaper called it an "outrageous" case of "racist prosecution". They were then transferred to Okinawa, where they spent months in the brig with the military prosecutor "pushing for 65 years of prison" after being ordered by the Marine Corps to drop the mutiny charges as clearly excessive. With the help of civilian lawyers and the prospect of charges of racism being aired during the trial, the military eventually backed down and settled for less than fully honorable discharges for the three. Three white marines also initially faced charges ranging from dereliction of duty to disorderly conduct—nowhere near as serious as mutiny or assault. However, they were acquitted or received no punishment. The events were characterized by The New York Times as "about race but also about structural racism."

== Background ==
The late 1960s and early 1970s were a contentious time for race relations in the U.S. Military as the civil rights and Black liberation movements found expression within the armed forces. Especially Black troops were responding to discrimination and racism in various ways. In 1971, a Congressional Black Caucus investigation concluded, "Racism has become institutionalized at all levels of the military...Black and other minority servicemen are victims of discrimination from the time that they enter the services until the time that they are discharged." The Caucus also reported that "sixty-four percent" of Black sailors and "seventy-three percent" of Black marines felt their branch of the military to be "a poor place for Blacks to be". All of this combined with growing antiwar sentiment within the military, reflecting similar sentiments in U.S. society and worldwide. The U.S. ground war in Southeast Asia had essentially stalemated with Army grunts increasingly refusing to fight or resisting the war in various other ways. By 1972, the U.S. military was forced to shift from ground operations and turn increasingly to air bombardment. This meant that a large part of U.S. combat operations was now concentrated in the Navy's Seventh Fleet and launched from its aircraft carriers in the Gulf of Tonkin.

Also in 1972, several unprecedented developments on board U.S. Navy ships dramatically exposed the intersection of antiwar sentiment, civil rights issues, discontent over working and safety conditions, and racism. By late that year approximately 12 percent “of new Navy recruits were black” and they were often "thrust into the dreariest, most menial, and most unpopular jobs on board" In October, "racial unrest triggered the worst shipboard riot in U.S. Navy history" on board the giant aircraft carrier, the USS Kitty Hawk. When arrests were made, all 25 of those arrested were Black. A Black Navy official observed, "Anytime you have a so-called race riot and you lock up 25 blacks, that has to raise some questions." As word spread in the fleet about the incidents on board the Kitty Hawk, many of the Black sailors on the USS Constellation were “swearing an affinity with their beleaguered brothers on the Kitty Hawk.” They formed a group called the “Black Fraction,” and attempted to negotiate with the ship's captain, but were told that "six of them would be given immediate less-than-honorable discharges” and 250 men would be administratively discharged. Over 100 sailors responded with a sit-in, forcing the captain to return the ship to shore. Once docked, 144 crew members left the ship, including 8 whites. The Constellation returned to sea but returned a few days later to pick up the mutinous sailors. Most of the men, however, refused to board and “staged a defiant dockside strike - perhaps the largest act of mass defiance in naval history.” During this same month, another riot occurred on board the oiler USS Hassayampa at the Subic Bay Naval Base in the Philippines. Again, of the 11 crewmen arrested, all were Black.

While the incidents aboard the USS Sumter took place the month before these other incidents, they had similar precipitating causes.

== Mutiny at sea ==
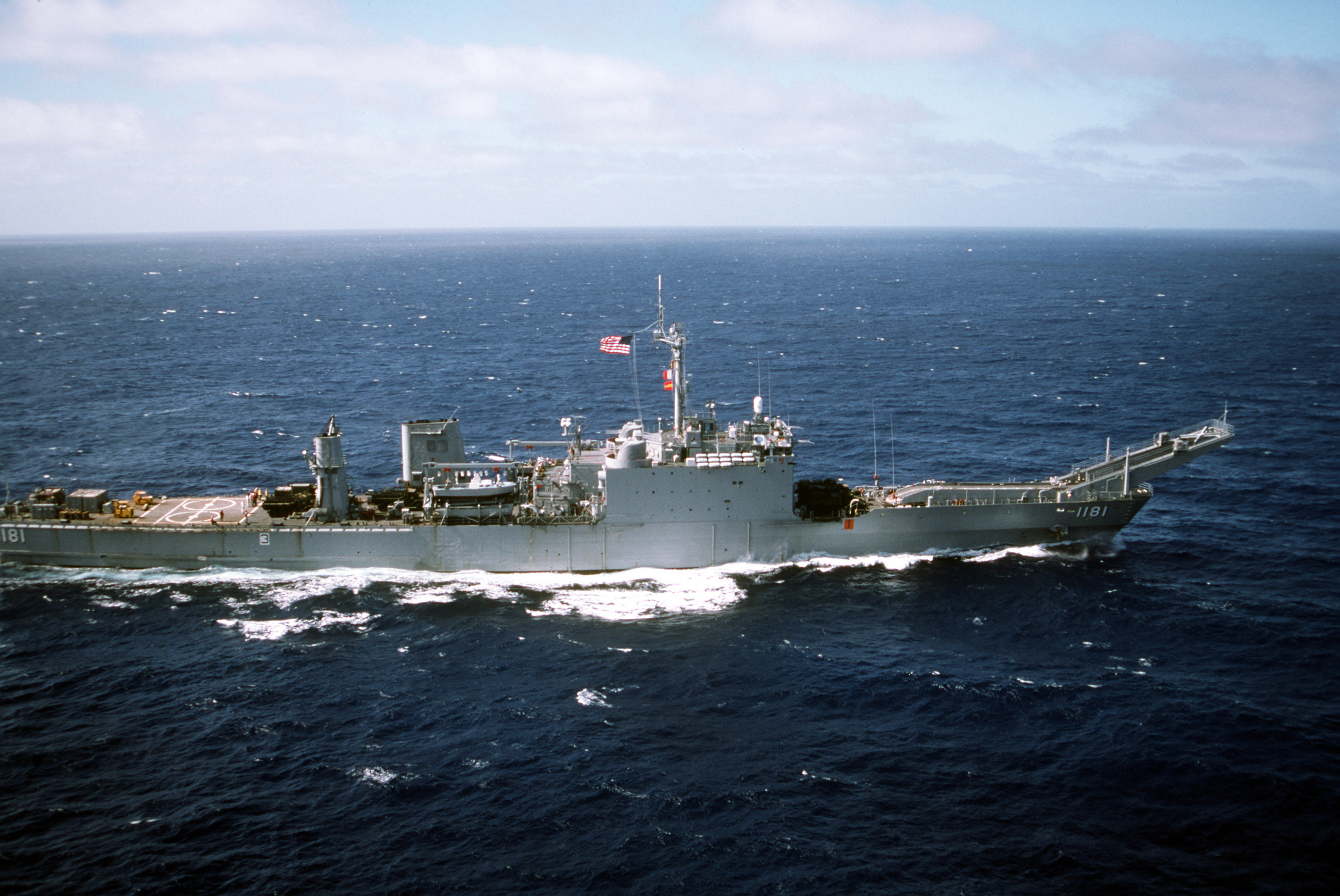
USS Sumter (LST-1181)

Sun, up down
On the corner, up town
I turn around and hear the sound
A voice is talking about who's gonna die next
Cause the White Man's got a God complex

These were the opening words of a song played by the Black marine DJ, PFC Jenkins, to the hundreds of men aboard the USS Sumter in late August 1972. The Black GIs onboard hadn't complained about the usual fare of white artists on the ship's radio, but for many of the white GIs, especially the white Marine sergeants and officers, this song and its lyrics were a problem. "The spoken word song centered on drugs, poverty, white supremacy, and the killings of Blacks and Native Americans." Jenkins quickly found himself in "a small room" being "questioned by a group of higher-ranking white Marines" and being accused of "playing music that would incite a riot." A white Marine captain got so incensed he "jumped out of his chair so forcefully that it flipped over." The tension and animosity were just beginning.

Over the following days, several fistfights broke out with increasing frequency between Black and white GIs—"some started by whites, other by Blacks." Meanwhile, Jenkins was ordered to stop playing The Last Poets, an order which so upset the 65 Black marines on board that 64 of them sent an informal complaint to the commanding Marine officer on the ship. The marines insisted that "they were being denied the right to play their own music", and requested a meeting with their battalion commander. The request was denied, "further inflaming" the tensions on board. In response, some of the Black marines were heard humming The Last Poets' tune as they carried out their shipboard duties. According to the Omega Press, a GI underground newspaper based out of Okinawa, Japan, "Whites, armed with pipes and wrenches, roamed the ship at times looking for blacks." One of the Black marines onboard who wasn't charged told The New York Times, "We were nonviolent until they came after us and said they didn’t like our music. Then there were riots." During one of the fights between Black and white marines on September 8, a Marine officer reported being hit by Jenkins as he attempted to separate the fighters. Jenkins didn't remember hitting him, but he was accused nonetheless. Soon, Jenkins, PFC Roy L. Barnwell, and Lance CPL James S. Blackwell found themselves "singled out as leaders" and charged with mutiny, assault, riot and resisting arrest. These were the "most severe" charges brought against any of the GIs involved in any of the incidents and rebellions which were discussed above, as well as the most severe brought against any marines since the Civil War.

== Hearing and trials ==
Once the Sumter Three arrived in Okinawa, they were able to obtain civilian lawyers, which significantly changed the dynamics of the case. The attorneys were able to mount a strong defense, including documenting some of the discrimination and racism experienced by the Black marines on board the ship. For example, the Black marine's daily routine often included "verbal attacks from white sergeants and officers", mess cooks serving them "cold and inedible food", unannounced uniform and bunk inspections, harassment and punishment for petty infractions, and more. One Black marine was confined to the brig for three days on bread and water for a minor uniform infraction, another had a "wrench thrown at him," while another was "attacked with a knife". None of these incidents were ever "investigated by the Marine leadership."

When the official Article 32 hearing commenced (the military's version of a preliminary hearing), the marines' civilian lawyers were able to quickly challenge and dispute the initial charges of mutiny as it was clear nothing like mutiny had taken place. However, the military soon added additional charges, including "riot and criminal slander". The slander charges were lodged against Blackwell for calling his marine commander a racist. Jenkins was scheduled for "a special court-martial on charges of disrespecting an officer and resisting arrest", while Barnwell and Blackwell were facing "general courts-martial for numerous counts of assault and resisting arrest." The military offered the three marines a deal to avoid court-martial by accepting undesirable discharges, but the marines refused. Blackwell told the press that he, Jenkins, and Blackwell were willing "to give up 10 years of our life to stop this". "[A]ll we want to do is just expose the marine corps of its racism, show how black and other third world GIs are constantly being railroaded into court and then given bad discharges and time."

During a lengthy five-week pre-trial hearing, many of the remaining additional charges were shown to be groundless, with even the investigating officer recommending that may be dropped or changed. In the end all charges were dropped on Barnwell and Blackwell, and they received honorable discharges for the "good of the service". Jenkins received a three-month sentence for two minor offenses after a special court-martial and was given "a general discharge under honorable conditions".

== Conclusion ==
In the book American Defense Reform: Lessons from Failure and Success in Navy History, two military experts looked at the incidents on board the Sumter, the Kitty Hawk, the Constellation, and the Hassayampa, and called them "just the tip of an iceberg of unrest." During four months in 1972, they cataloged 98 race-related criminal cases, and they reported that "the Navy was suffering from an epidemic of sabotage by sailors disgruntled with social or racial conditions that were threatening the readiness of the entire fleet."

The events on board the Sumter and the military's prosecution of the Sumter Three were some of the earlier events during this period and the racial underpinnings could not be ignored. Even the chief of naval operations, Elmo Zumwalt, was critical of what he called the "lily-white racist Navy". Historically, "racial bias" has often played a role in the military's decisions about who to prosecute for racial unrest. A 1972 Department of Defense study reported that Black GIs "received a higher proportion of general and undesirable discharges than whites of similar aptitude and education." As recently as 2015 a study by Protect Our Defenders, a "legal justice group", found that Black service members were still "substantially more likely than white service members to face military justice or disciplinary action".

For those directly involved, the repercussions were long-lasting. According to The New York Times, Jenkins, Barnwell, and Blackwell had difficult lives after their experiences on board the ship. As Jenkins put it, "That situation on the Sumter screwed up my whole life."

== See also ==
=== Events ===
- Fort Dix 38
- Fort Hood Three
- Fort Lewis Six
- Intrepid Four
- Presidio mutiny

=== General ===
- Racism against African Americans in the U.S. military
