= Intrepid Four =

U.S. Sailors who deserted to oppose the Vietnam War

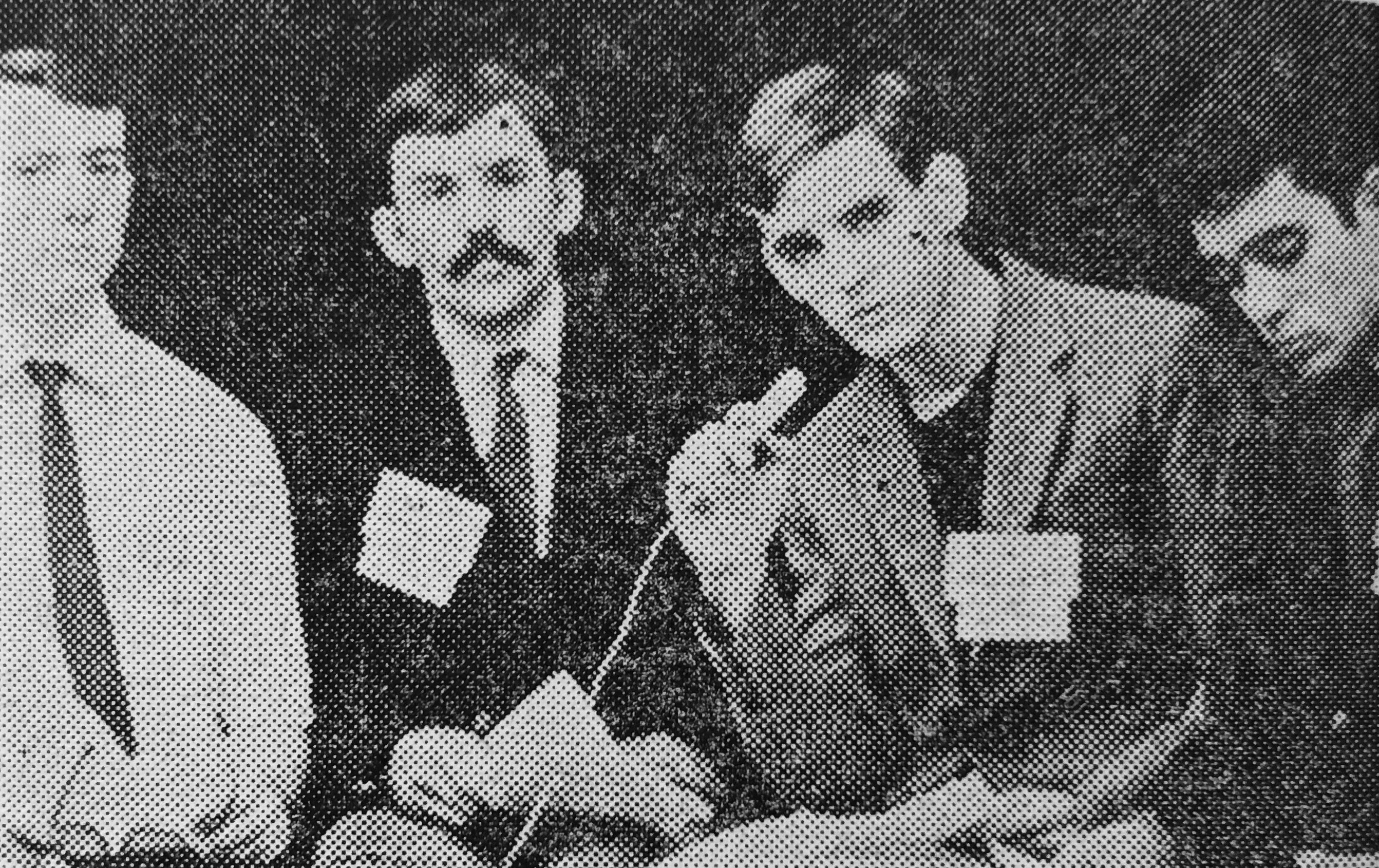
The Intrepid Four—from left, Michael Lindner, Craig W. Anderson, Richard Bailey, and John Barilla—in Japan in 1967

The Intrepid Four were a group of United States Navy sailors who grew to oppose what they called "the American aggression in Vietnam" and publicly deserted from the USS Intrepid in October 1967 as it docked in Japan during the Vietnam War. They were among the first American troops whose desertion was publicly announced during the war and the first within the U.S. Navy. The fact that it was a group, and not just an individual, made it more newsworthy.

== Background ==
Rates of desertion by American troops were extremely high during the Vietnam War, with The New York Times reporting in 1974 that there had been 503,926 desertions from the U.S. military up to that point in the war. This vastly exceeded the number of deserters during World War II. By 1966, the desertion rate was 8.43 per thousand, which markedly increased to 33.9 per thousand in 1971. Desertion in Japan was considered particularly challenging due to the language barrier between US troops and Japanese citizens and the differences in appearances, which caused American troops to stand out. About 1,000 US citizens went to Sweden as draft evaders or deserters between April 1967 and March 1973.

== Desertion ==
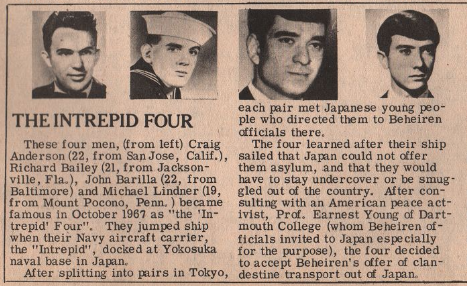
The Intrepid Four: Newsclip from Amex - the American expatriate in Canada

The four were Craig W. Anderson, John Barilla, Richard Bailey, and Michael Lindner (who later changed his last name to Sutherland). Bailey and Lindner were 19, while Anderson and Barilla were 20 on October 23, 1967 when they decided not to return to their ship at the end of their day-long shore leave. They destroyed their military identification and uniforms. They eventually made contact with the Japanese peace group Beheiren. The four were the first American soldiers that Beheiren helped desert. In 1967 and 1968, the group would help as many as 17 other U.S. deserters, including Terry Whitmore who deserted in 1968.

Beheiren asked the Soviet Embassy for help moving the seamen out of Japan. The Soviet Union agreed, with the intention of using the desertion for anti-Vietnam War propaganda. To pressure the Soviets to treat the four Americans well, Beheiren arranged a press conference in Tokyo in November 1967.

During the press conference, Beheiren played a documentary film it created by interviewing the four sailors. The sailors released a public statement on November 17, saying, "We four ... are against all aggressive wars in general and are against the American aggression in Vietnam in particular. We oppose the continuing increase of military might of the USA in Vietnam and other countries of Southeast Asia. We consider it a crime for a technologically developed country to be engaged in the murder of civilians and to be destroying a small developing, agricultural country."

The four were then smuggled into the USSR, where they stayed for about a month. Here, too, they made statements against the Vietnam War and explained their motives as based on American ideals. In December 1967, all four arrived in Sweden. They were featured on a CBS Special Report, where they once again affirmed their stand and defended themselves from accusations of having betrayed America.

Many years later, Mike Sutherland (originally Lindner) wrote more about the Four's decision. They were all stationed onboard the USS Intrepid off the coast of Vietnam. Sutherland explained, "I saw with my own eyes the enormous quantity of bombs that our planes hurled on the Vietnamese ... All this caused me to think about the nature of the war. I understood that thousands of people were dying. These airplanes were wiping villages from the face of the earth, destroying cities, burning children with napalm." He soon met others onboard who felt as he did. "We finally came to the conclusion that staying in the military, knowing how we felt, would be a crime against humanity."

== Aftermath ==
On January 9, 1968, Sweden granted the four Americans humanitarian asylum. They were not the first American deserters to arrive there, but were the first to receive international press coverage through doing so. Sweden's acceptance of American deserters was viewed with hostility by the US, who saw it as directly undermining the war effort. Swedish-American diplomacy was significantly damaged. In 1970, Anderson left Sweden and went to Canada, sneaking across the border into the US. In March 1972, Anderson was arrested by the Federal Bureau of Investigation in San Francisco and imprisoned for eight months. He was given a bad conduct discharge from the Navy in November 1972. As of 2016, Barilla was living in Canada. Bailey died in about 2015 and Lindner still lived in Sweden in 2025.

The ship they deserted from has become a floating museum permanently docked in New York City where one of the onboard exhibits is called "Dissent On Board" and tells the story of the Intrepid Four.

== See also ==
- A Matter of Conscience
- Brian Willson
- Concerned Officers Movement
- Court-martial of Howard Levy
- Donald W. Duncan
- FTA Show – 1971 anti-Vietnam War road show for GIs
- F.T.A. – documentary film about the FTA Show
- Fort Hood Three
- GI's Against Fascism
- GI Coffeehouses
- GI Underground Press
- Movement for a Democratic Military
- Opposition to United States involvement in the Vietnam War
- Presidio mutiny
- Sir! No Sir!, a documentary about the antiwar movement within the ranks of the United States Armed Forces
- Stop Our Ship (SOS)
- The Spitting Image, a 1998 book by Vietnam veteran and sociology professor Jerry Lembcke which disproves the widely believed narrative that American soldiers were spat upon and insulted by antiwar protesters
- Veterans For Peace
- Vietnam Veterans Against the War
- Waging Peace in Vietnam
- Winter Soldier Investigation
