= Fort Lewis Six =

Six U.S. Army enlisted men courts-martialed for refusing orders to Vietnam in June 1970

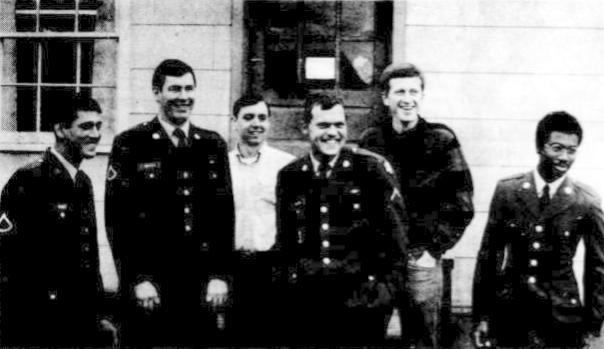
The Fort Lewis Six arrested in June 1970 for refusing orders to Vietnam.

The Fort Lewis Six were six U.S. Army enlisted men at the Fort Lewis Army base in the Seattle and Tacoma, Washington area who in June 1970 refused orders to the Vietnam War and were then courts-martialed. They had all applied for conscientious objector status and been turned down by the Pentagon. The Army then ordered them to report for assignment to Vietnam, which they all refused. The Army responded by charging them with "willful disobedience" which carried a maximum penalty of five years at hard labor. The six soldiers were Private First Class Manuel Perez, a Cuban refugee; Private First Class Paul A. Forest, a British citizen from Liverpool; Specialist 4 Carl M. Dix Jr. from Baltimore; Private James B. Allen from Goldsboro, North Carolina; Private First Class Lawrence Galgano from Brooklyn, New York; and Private First Class Jeffrey C. Griffith from Vaughn, Washington. According to the local GI underground newspaper at Fort Lewis, this was the largest mass refusal of direct orders to Vietnam at the base up to that point in the war. Their refusal and subsequent treatment by the Army received national press coverage.

== Background ==
During the Vietnam War, Fort Lewis became a major staging area for troops being sent to the war zone. It processed the induction of 2.3 million soldiers between 1966 and 1972, and became one of the army's central training grounds for Vietnam combat, complete with a 15,000-acre mock Vietnam village containing thatched-roof structures, hidden tunnels, and play-acting "Viet Cong." The anti-Vietnam War movement in the local area near the base also grew with the expansion of the war. In the fall of 1968, various antiwar and student activists united with dissident GIs to form the GI-Civilian Alliance for Peace (GI-CAP). Before the end of the year other activists opened The Shelter Half antiwar GI Coffeehouse in Tacoma. The Shelter Half and GI-CAP began working together and soon active-duty soldiers and local activists organized antiwar activity. On February 16, 1969, an estimated 300 GIs led around 1,000 demonstrators through downtown Seattle to a rally at Tacoma's Eagles Auditorium where they listened to speeches against the war and racism, and for GI rights. By the end of 1970, six different underground antiwar newspapers had been created for and by GIs in the area. The newspapers, including the Lewis-McChord Free Press, Vietnam GI, and Fed Up!, were often smuggled onto bases and spread through GI networks far beyond the Seattle/Tacoma area.

On December 11, 1969, The Shelter Half received an official letter announcing that the military was placing it "OFF LIMITS" for all military personnel. According to the New York Times, this was "the first time that the military ha[d] moved to prevent soldiers from frequenting" GI coffeehouses. In response a group of students at the University of Washington in Seattle organized what they called "the Trial of the Army", which on January 21 convened a panel of thirteen active-duty servicemen to listen to testimony about the Vietnam War and daily life in the military. Hundreds of civilians and GIs attended the mock-trial which heard from more than 50 local GIs as well as civilians. The "Trial" generated significant local and national publicity and probably contributed to the military's decision to abandon their efforts to declare the Shelter Half off limits.

== Applied for Conscientious Objector Status ==
It was in this environment that a group of 13 GIs applied for conscientious objector (CO) status in late 1969 and early 1970. The Fort Lewis Six were part of this larger group and all were kept in a guarded and segregated unit to prevent them from talking to other GIs. All said they would refuse to go to Vietnam, but some were discharged and others went absent without leave (AWOL). The six had all received legal advice and counseling from the Pacific Counseling Service (PCS), an antiwar counseling organization which saw itself as trying to make the U.S. Armed Forces "adhere more closely to regulations concerning conscientious objector discharges and G.I. rights." PCS, stated in a press release that the six men had met with "a number of Tacoma citizens, many of them clergymen" who "have no doubts about their sincerity", a key element of CO status. The Pentagon disagreed, however, turning down all six applications stating the "applicants do not hold belief against war in any form as determined by religious training or belief." An attorney for the six quickly appealed their case in Federal Court, but on September 16, 1970, a Federal Judge concurred with the military and turned down petitions for writs of Habeas corpus and Temporary Restraining Orders.

== Ordered to Vietnam ==
Within days of the court decision the men received their orders to Vietnam which they refused. While the numbers of GIs at Fort Lewis who refused orders to Vietnam was climbing, and some estimated it to be as many as five a week during this period, this was the largest known group refusal to date. The Army threw four of the six into the stockade for pre-trial confinement, an unusual move which GI advocates argued was contrary to military regulations. The Lewis-McChord Free Press reported that Base "regulation 27-2 explicitly states that pre-trial confinement is to be used only when there is danger" of self-harm or flight, neither of which applied to any of the four. Apparently the four were singled out for harsher treatment because on June 14, while they were awaiting the Pentagon's decision on their CO status, they had participated in an action at the Main Chapel on Fort Lewis. The four GIs, along with four civilians rededicated the chapel to Saint Maximilian, a Christian who was executed for refusing induction into the Roman Army in 295 A.D and is considered to be the earliest recorded conscientious objector. The other two were confined to barracks.

== Courts Martial ==
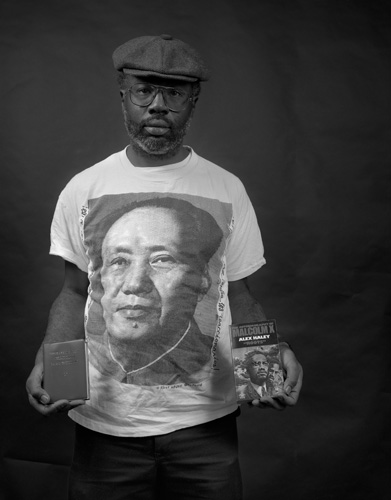
Carl Dix photo by William Short from A Matter of Conscience

In separate courts martial trials on October 26, 27 and 28, 1970, the six were all found guilty. Five were convicted of Article 90 violations for willfully and purposely disobeying the lawful command of a superior commissioned officer. The sixth man, Jeffrey Griffith, was convicted of an Article 92 violation for disobeying a direct order. The Article 92 charge against Griffith is less severe as he hadn't been issued a direct verbal order from his commander. All six were convicted of receiving and disobeying written orders but only five were also convicted of the more serious Article 90 charge of violating direct verbal orders. In an interview years later, Carl Dix stated "The military judge made it very clear he wasn't listening. He says, 'You guys can make your arguments for the record, I am not going to consider them, I don't care what you have to say.'"

== The Fort Lewis Stockade Liberation Front ==
They were initially all sent to the military stockade at Fort Lewis, but within a short period of time three of them, Dix, Allen and Forest, created what they called the Fort Lewis Stockade Liberation Front which organized a fast in the prison to demand freedom of speech and assembly, a free press, an expansion of the stockade library, the release of all political prisoners from maximum security cells, the right to form a committee of prisoners to negotiate with the administration, and the right to hold weekly press conferences. This did not go down well with the military and the three were "thrown into maximum security solitary cells and threatened with forced intravenous feeding." When news of this reached civilian activists outside the base, a group of local ministers demanded to see the prisoners. The Army responded by shipping the three to Leavenworth Military Prison in Kansas bringing the Stockade Liberation Front to an end.

== Sentences ==
The five convicted of the more serious charge were sentenced for periods ranging from one to three years. Allen received three years at hard labor and a dishonorable discharge, Dix received two years and a bad conduct discharge, Forrest got two years and a dishonorable discharge, Perez and Galgano received one year and a bad conduct discharge and Griffith, who was convicted of the lesser charge, was given two months. At the time of the sentencing Paul Forest was quoted as saying, "They asked me to violate my own being. There is nothing I can do in the Army but go to jail." Dix told the same interviewer, "I just have to exist, to be my own man, and accept the consequences. If I had continued to participate in the Army, I wouldn't be able to relate to myself or humanity."

== See also ==
- Brian Willson
- Carl Dix
- Concerned Officers Movement
- Court-martial of Howard Levy
- Donald W. Duncan
- Fort Hood Three
- FTA Show
- GI's Against Fascism
- GI Coffeehouses
- Movement for a Democratic Military
- Opposition to United States involvement in the Vietnam War
- Presidio mutiny
- Sir! No Sir!, a documentary about the anti-war movement within the ranks of the United States Armed Forces
- Stop Our Ship (SOS)
- Veterans For Peace
- Vietnam Veterans Against the War
- Waging Peace in Vietnam
- Winter Soldier Investigation
