= Resistance Inside the Army =

American Vietnam War protest movement

The abbreviation or acronym RITA (sometimes written in low case, "rita") stands for "Resistance Inside the Army", "Resister Inside the Army", or "Resist! Inside the Army".

It was first invented by the American Private Richard (Dick) Perrin in September 1967. It was soon widely used to describe "the resistance inside the American military" during the Vietnam War, and up to the present as a concept for similar "Resistance" movements in other armies. The term is also sometimes projected backward historically, to earlier wars when the term did not yet exist, but the phenomenon arguably already did.

Such RITA movements distinguish themselves from other components of anti-war movements, such as draft resistance or desertion, by the fact of their activists being soldiers and intending to go on being soldiers.

== Definition of RITA ==
A definition of RITA was given in 1968 by PFC Terry Klug and published in the G.I. paper ACT (whose publication, as an "unauthorised" paper written by and for soldiers, was itself a major act of RITA). It was written during the Vietnam War and is still used up to the present with necessary adjustments for other countries and later wars such as the Iraq War.

As can be seen from the context, "RITA" can refer for both the phenomenon of "Resistance inside the army" and a person who is a "Resister inside the army".

What is a Rita? A Rita is a Resister Inside the Armed Forces, an American Serviceman who resists imperialistic aggression in S.E. Asia. His reasons may be political, pacifistic or whatever.

What is a Full-Time RITA? A full-time Resister is a soldier who has temporarily left the Armed Forces to work against his country's inhuman aggression in S.E. Asia. He does not consider himself a deserter; usually he has the intention of returning after the war. He is neither unpatriotic nor anti-American. He is merely an individual acting in the ways that he believes to be right and for the best human interests.

what is a FRITA? A friend of RITA, an American, European or other civilian, who helps Ritas operate.

What do RITAs do? They organize resistance to the war such as the growing American Servicemen's Union (ASU) inside the Armed Forces. They provide a source of truth for G.I.'s by distributing G.I. papers such as the BOND and by writing and editing the ACT. The RITA newsletter ACT is put out by full-time resisters for the sole purpose of presenting the truth to American Servicemen who at one time or another will be called upon to serve the war machine.

RITAs and FRITAs are not tightly organized with officers, membership or a given political line. Rather they are individuals of many political, religious and philosophical beliefs united in their opposition to this war.

RITAs and FRITAs work with any person, organization, or group who will help American Servicemen fight against this war.

The above definition - published in ACT, the RITA's Newsletter -ended with a direct address to US soldiers and specifically, to soldiers serving in Europe: We are more interested in acts than in words. Can you help?.

=== The Sartre connection ===
Those interested were invited to write to "J.P. Sartre, BP 130, Paris 14, France", and letters arrived at this address from American soldiers all over the world, including in Vietnam itself.

The post office box was indeed registered in the name of the famous philosopher Jean-Paul Sartre. An outspoken opponent of the American military involvement in Vietnam, Sartre agreed to render this service to the dissident American soldiers based in Paris, who were apprehensive of police interference with their mails. Over a considerable period, Sartre's secretary every morning emptied the post box and delivered the RITA mails to activists living in the Latin Quarter.

Naturally, it was difficult for soldiers on active service to maintain this kind of correspondence via the official military mails, subject to official monitoring and censorship. However, the thriving black market maintained by American soldiers and deserters at the Cholon area of Saigon included a quite efficient "alternate postal link" through which "Ritas" could send and receive mail completely free of any interference by the military authorities.

== History of RITA ==
=== Jane Fonda and RITA ===
According to Max Watts, an activist who was involved with RITA at Paris in the late 1960s and later during the early 1970s in Heidelberg, West Germany (at present based in Australia), contact with the movement had a considerable part in radicalising the positions of the well-known actress Jane Fonda.

=== Fate of F.T.A. film ===
The F.T.A. film was commercially released around 12 July 1972. At the time Jane Fonda was in North Vietnam, under American bombs. She had been invited by the North Vietnamese government to witness American attacks – denied by the US government – on the dikes in the Red River delta. A week later, by the time Fonda returned to the US via Paris, all copies of the F.T.A. film had been "withdrawn" and apparently destroyed. It is still unclear why. According to Francine Parker, one of the directors, the Nixon White House "pressured the distributor", American Independent Films (AIF). AIF has not responded to queries on this subject.

Fonda was at the world premiere of F.T.A. at the National movie theatre in Westwood Village (Los Angeles), California in July 1972. She was interviewed on local TV news by reporter Bob Banfield.

"Dirty" video copies of F.T.A. circulated both in Vietnam and later, also amongst American soldiers in Iraq. Subtitles were hard to read. A "clean" copy has surfaced, and is now also available on DVD.

Sequences of the "clean" F.T.A. film, with Jane Fonda as she was in 1971, have been included in the RITA film Sir! No Sir!, in which Fonda also speaks about the Iraq War.

Jane Fonda has again become very active as a Frita ("Friend of RITAs") opposed to the Iraq/American war.

== ACT, the Rita's Newsletter ==
ACT, the Rita's Newsletter - had an initial "direct press run" of 10,000. Vol 1 had 5 issues. By Vol 2 (2 issues) the direct press run was 25,000. ACT was frequently reprinted by other RITA GIs and Fritas in Europe, the USA, Vietnam and Australia.

== See also ==
- Opposition to United States involvement in the Vietnam War
- Conscientious objector
