= Concerned Officers Movement =

Organization of U.S. military officers opposed to the Vietnam War

Newsletter Logo of the Concerned Officers Movement.

The Concerned Officers Movement (COM) was an organization of mainly junior officers formed within the U.S. military in the early 1970s. Though its principal purpose was opposition to the U.S. involvement in the Vietnam War, it also fought for First Amendment rights within the military. It was initiated in the Washington, D.C., area by commissioned officers who were also Vietnam Veterans. It rapidly expanded throughout all branches and many bases of the U.S. military, ultimately playing an influential role in the opposition to the Vietnam War. At least two of its chapters expanded their ranks to include enlisted personnel (non-officers), with the San Diego chapter changing its name to Concerned Military, and the Kodiak, Alaska chapter to Concerned Servicemen's Movement.

== Founding ==
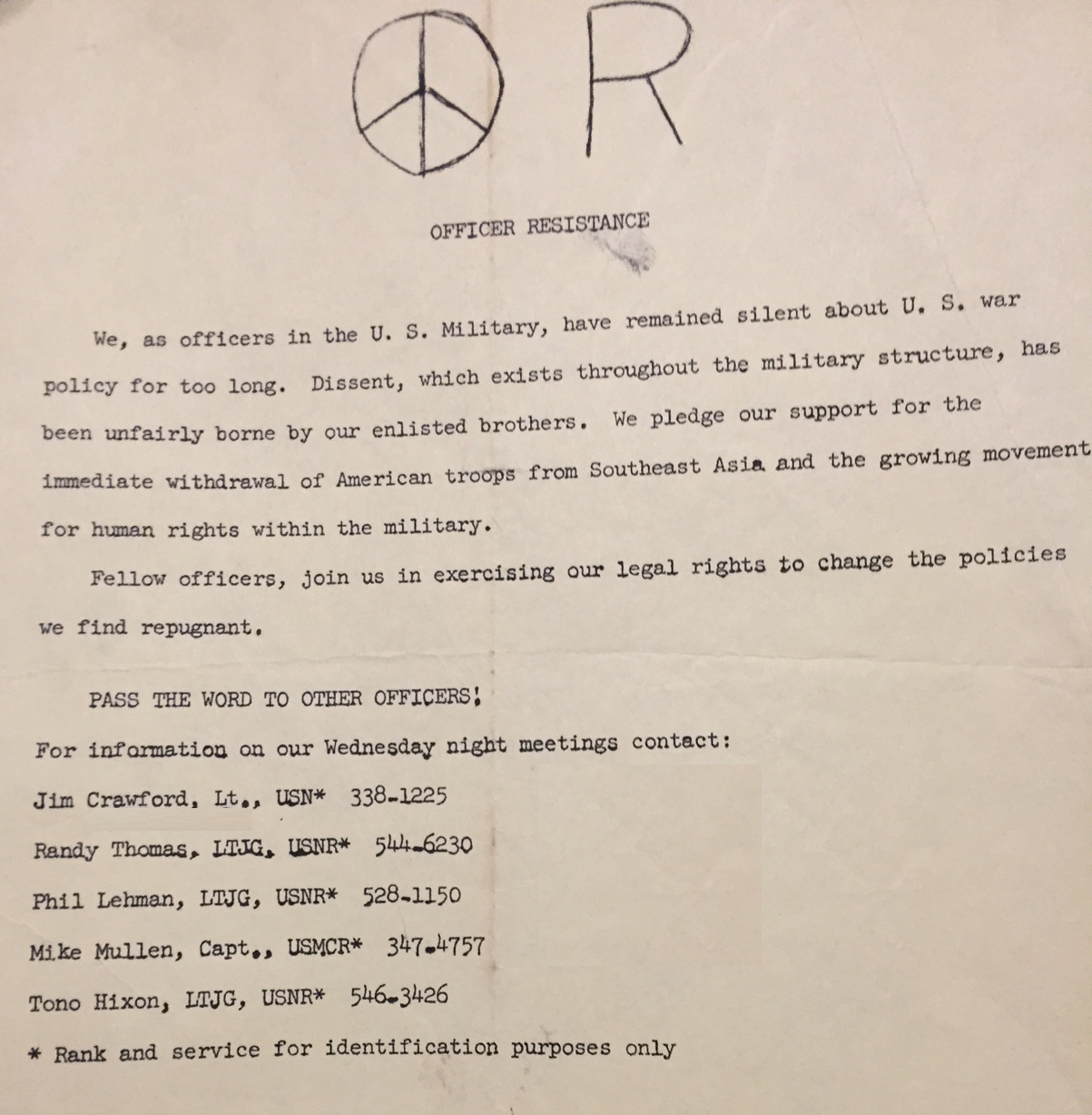
Concerned Officers Movement first leaflet issued for GI Rally for Peace and Justice in Washington, DC March 14, 1970

COMs genesis sprang from the participation of Marine Captain Bob Brugger in the November 1969 March on Washington against the Vietnam War. The Washington Post carried an article about Brugger and his wife that caused his superior officers to enter an unsatisfactory mark for loyalty in his fitness report and generated supportive phone calls from other officers. Brugger's opposition to "blind patriotism" and his stand against racism at home and in Vietnam had struck a chord with other officers who read the article.

Over several months a group of officers agreed to work together and on March 14, 1970, they participated as Officers' Resistance in a G.I. Rally for Peace and Justice in Washington, D.C. By the end of March 1970 they had changed their name to the Concerned Officers Movement. Early members who signed the first published newsletter were LT Jim Crawford, USN; CPT Ed Fox, USA; CPT Gerry Giovaniello, USAR; LTJG Tono Hixon, USNR; LTJG Phil Lehman, USNR; LTJG Randy Thomas, USNR; CPT Larry Wasser, USA (MC); and CPT Bob Gaines, USAR. Other early members were 1LT Louis Font, a West Point honor graduate, who received extensive national media coverage for his stand against the war and CAPT Mike Mullen, USMCR who was one of the contacts on the organization's first leaflet (see image to right).

COM's first newsletter, published in April 1970, described the organization's political views:

The Concerned Officers' Movement was formed by a group of active duty and reserve officers who could no longer continue to be passive, unquestioning agents of military and national policies they found untenable.

Paramount in the program of COM is a fervent opposition to the continuing military effort in Vietnam. COM decries the military policies that turned an internal political struggle into a nation-destroying bloodbath. The application of American military power in Vietnam was as unnecessary as it was unworkable.

COM further abhors the military mentality that promotes absurd measures like the body count; that leads to the indiscriminate slaughter of innocent civilians; that destroys land and villages and calls it victory.

While stating they were "loyal, responsible military officers", they supported "a cease-fire and the rapid disengagement of American troops from Southeast Asia", opposed the "preponderant share of national resources devoted to the military", and called for the "free expression of dissenting opinion" within the military.

== Media coverage and growth ==
The fact that military officers had formed a group openly speaking out against the war and the U.S. military was unprecedented and quickly reached the national media. On June 3, 1970, The New York Times announced that the "antiwar movement has reached the United States military officers corps." "Calling themselves the Concerned Officers Movement, about 25 officers based in Washington, most of them Navy men, have banded together to provide a forum for what they say is growing disillusionment among their ranks with the Indochina war."

COM continued to grow and on September 26, 1970, 28 members representing about 250 others on active duty from the Army, Navy, Air Force and Marine Corps held a press conference in Washington, D.C., to announce "their intention to speak against the war in Vietnam" and "to encourage other officers to express antiwar opinions". Font told the press, "I reject this war....I have asked myself time and again: 'When the law becomes a crime, consensus and conformity becomes a crime, am I to condone it?' My answer is no." Major Albert Braverman, a physician at Walter Reed Army Medical Center, stated that COM had active chapters at the Marine base at Camp Lejeune, NC, at Navy and Marine bases in Norfolk, VA, Pensacola, FL and San Diego, at Army bases at Fort Bragg, NC, and Fort Jackson, SC, at the Air Force base in Grand Forks, ND, and in Iceland and Hawaii. They also read an open letter to Secretary of Defense Melvin Laird demanding an immediate withdrawal from the war written by LTJG John Kent, USN, an Annapolis graduate, all-American wrestler and jet fighter pilot, and signed by 29 officers of the San Diego chapter of COM ranging in rank from ensign to lieutenant commander.

COM carried out a variety of antiwar activities throughout 1970 and 1971. It published a newsletter, which by the fourth issue was called COMmon Sense, distributing it throughout the armed services. It bought newspaper ads calling for an immediate withdrawal of American forces from Vietnam, wrote leaflets, printed posters and held press conferences. COM's Norfolk Naval Base chapter paid for a billboard outside the base that read Peace Now. In May 1971, 29 officers from Fort Bragg and Pope Air Force Base took out a "scathing antiwar" ad in the Fayetteville Observer which they openly signed with name, rank and military branch. This was the first time this many military officers from one place publicly opposed the war. Soon, officers from Fort Jackson, Fort Knox and Minot Air Force Base were signing similar ads in their local papers. On September 13, 1971, over 130 officers from all over the U.S. signed a full-page antiwar ad in the Washington Post.

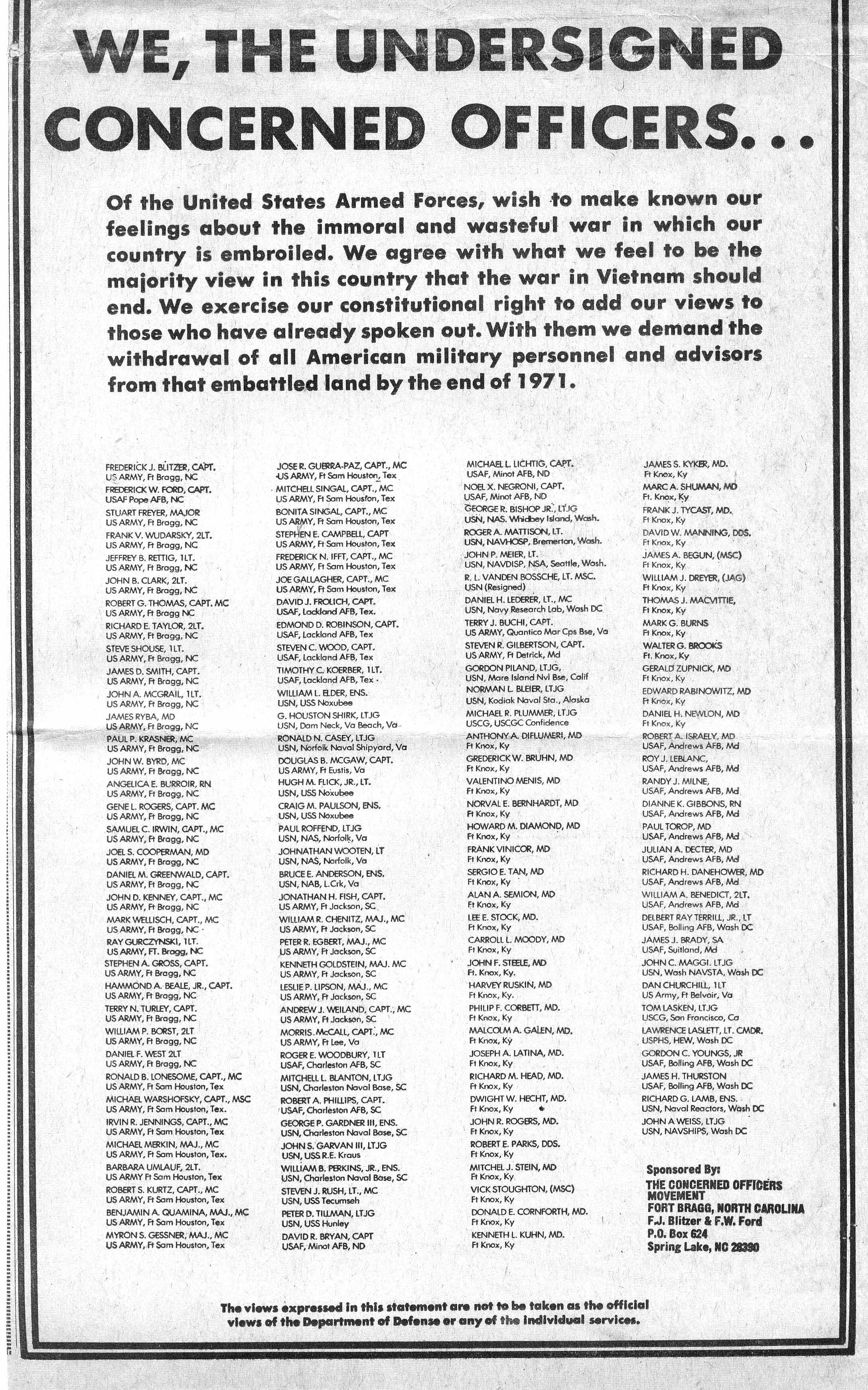
Ad placed by the Fort Bragg COM Chapter in the Washington Post Sept 13, 1971

== Military retaliation ==
Initially, many COM members wanted to stay within the military and felt they had a right to express dissenting views. In fact, their third newsletter argued that responsible dissent "can and must be allowed to exist in the military, if it is to keep pace with the times in which we live." "We believe that such expressions of our convictions are within our rights, and that in expressing them, we are following our obligations as officers to defend the Constitution." The organization felt the armed forces were an insular and hidebound world and explored ways to establish the right of free speech for active duty servicemen, both officers and enlisted.

The military, however, disagreed and in many cases reprimanded, discharged and transferred COM members soon after their participation became known. Within three weeks of their September 26, 1970, press conference many COM members were facing retaliation. One Navy doctor in the San Diego chapter was discharged on 48 hours' notice after making his membership known. Official military spokespeople blamed budget cutbacks or force reductions, but COM members were told privately they were being discharged due to their membership. The New York Times quoted a Pentagon spokesman who denied the existence of a "purge" of antiwar officers, but then went on to admit the military did get concerned when these officers "go public". He argued that public statements "[d]raw the radicals to them like bees to honey", making them "duck soup for radicals" and raising "questions about the officers' reliability." Ironically, some members who did want to get out were forced to stay in the military against their will and given orders transferring them to remote military bases like Adak, Alaska, or even Vietnam.

As a result, COM had a high turnover rate as the military discharged or transferred its members. This, combined with its focus on active duty officers, meant the national organization was relatively short-lived, tapering off considerably by the end of 1971.

== Unprecedented activity ==
In early 1971 COM created quite a stir by holding press conferences on both coasts calling for an investigation into the military's top brass for possible war crimes. Under the auspices of The National Committee for a Citizens Commission of Inquiry on U.S. War Crimes in Vietnam (Citizens Commission of Inquiry), COM held press conferences on January 12 in Washington, D.C., and January 20 in Los Angeles calling for an investigation into the "responsibility for war crimes of key military figures", including Generals William Westmoreland and Creighton Abrams, and Admiral Elmo Zumwalt. While formally they were only calling for an investigation, they presented evidence of war crimes and catastrophic environmental damage, leaving the impression they were accusing their own commanders of war crimes. The Washington, D.C. COM members involved were CPT Robert Master, USA, CPT Grier Merwin, USA, Fox, Font and LTJG Peter Dunkelberger, USN. In Los Angeles were LT Norman Banks, USAF, LTJG Ted Shallcross, USN, LT James Skelly, USN, and Kent.

Later that same year COM members used the military's own practice of encouraging the wearing of uniforms to religious services to conduct antiwar demonstrations in uniform, a prohibited activity under military regulations. On April 23, 1971, ignoring warnings from higher ups that their actions would be considered a political demonstration, COM organized a memorial service at Washington's National Cathedral involving more than 250 officers in uniform honoring all the war dead, on both sides of the war. On May 2, 45 officers and enlisted men from the San Diego Chapter wore their uniforms to a similar antiwar "religious" event in Exposition Park in Los Angeles led by a prominent antiwar Episcopal minister, George Regas. As one of the men who participated later recalled in his memoir: "Thus, with one of our men playing the haunting lament on his bugle that is heard at military funerals, we marched with [a] coffin draped with the flags of the Viet Cong, North Vietnam, South Vietnam, and the United States." No one was ever reprimanded or punished for these actions, probably because the military decided it would be better to ignore the whole thing and pretend it never happened.

== The San Diego Chapter ==
The San Diego COM, located in the principal homeport of the Pacific Fleet, may have been the most active chapter and was certainly the longest lasting, continuing actively until late 1973. The Chapter was initiated by Kent and local antiwar activist Jeannie Boyle and formally founded in July 1970 by Kent, LT Harold Appel, USN, Skelly and Shallcross. Very quickly it broadened its outreach to include enlisted men and women and by 1972 had changed its name to Concerned Military. On May 15, 1971, which they called Armed Farces Day, they hosted the touring FTA "political vaudeville" antiwar show, known to most GIs as the "Fuck The Army" Show, featuring Jane Fonda, Donald Sutherland, Peter Boyle, Dick Gregory, and Country Joe McDonald. The show, held in the auditorium of San Diego High School, was a tremendous success with a capacity crowd of over 2,400 enthusiastic sailors and marines, and contributed to the growth and reputation of the chapter.

=== Efforts to stop an aircraft carrier ===
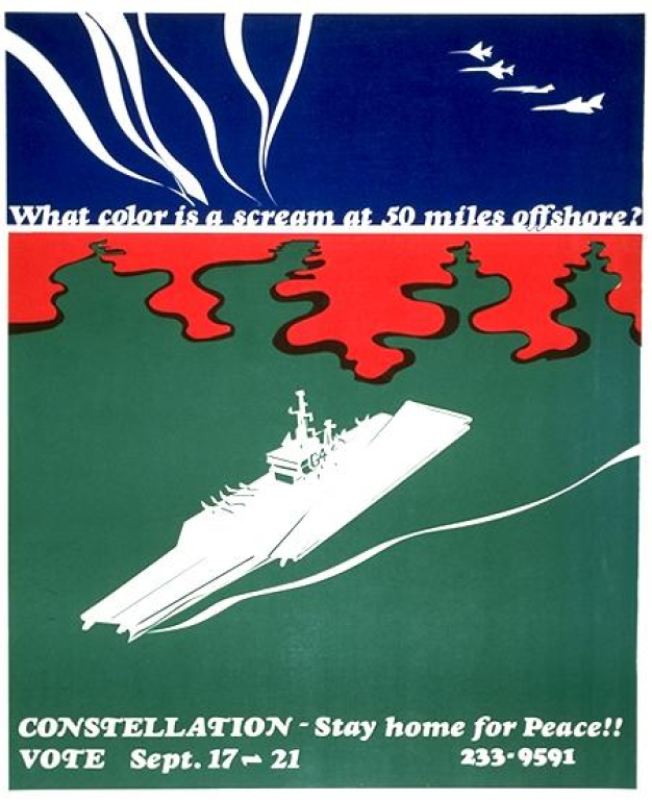
Poster used for the Constellation Vote

They also joined with other antiwar activists in major efforts to mobilize opposition to the departure for Vietnam of several aircraft carriers. The first of these projects attracted antiwar activists from all over California and was aimed at trying to keep the USS Constellation from sailing. The project was initiated by a group called San Diego Nonviolent Action, which united with COM to focus on the role of aircraft carriers. They had the initial goal of stopping the Constellation from returning to Vietnam through education and non-violent activity like a blockade or by preventing military personnel from getting to the naval base. Very quickly, this effort expanded into a multi-faceted campaign.

=== Constellation Vote ===
As veteran antiwar activists, including Joan Baez and David Harris, became involved, Harris suggested organizing a citywide referendum on whether the Constellation should set sail. This Constellation Vote became a major antiwar campaign over several months that led to a citywide straw vote in late September 1971 with 54,721 votes counted. Over 82% of voters elected to keep the ship home, including 73% of the military personnel who voted. While not a "real" vote, the impact on public opinion was appreciable. Even an unsympathetic observer deemed the overall effort to stop the Constellation "an impressive campaign", and the commander-in-chief of the Pacific Fleet was quoted as saying "never was there such a concerted effort to entice American servicemen from their posts."

A considerable amount of research was conducted into the role of aircraft carriers in modern warfare by Professor William Watson of MIT who was then a visiting Professor of History at UC San Diego. He argued in a widely distributed pamphlet that aircraft carriers had become weapons "used to crush popular uprisings and to bully the weaker and poorer countries of the world."

=== Creative protest methods ===
The involvement of large numbers of antiwar officers and enlisted men created significant debate in the traditionally pro-military town. It also permitted creative methods not normally available to other antiwar groups, such as the CONSTELLATION STAY HOME FOR PEACE banner frequently seen being towed over the city by recently retired navy flight instructor LT John Huyler, and the Constellation Vote stickers found everywhere on board the USS Constellation, including in the captain's personal bathroom. Bathroom stickers weren't the only complication the captain had to deal with. Over 1,300 of the ship's sailors signed a petition requesting the FTA Show be allowed on board. The captain refused this request but then got himself in hot water by intercepting and destroying 2,500 pieces of U.S. mail sent by antiwar activists to crewmembers. Faced with a possible court of inquiry and health problems, the captain was removed from command before the ship sailed.

=== Connie 9 ===
When the Constellation actually did sail for Vietnam, no visible blockade occurred but nine of its crew publicly refused to go and took sanctuary in a local Catholic church, Christ the King, with the support of COM members and other activists. The "Connie 9" as they were quickly dubbed, were soon arrested in an early morning raid by US Marshals and flown back to the ship, but within weeks were honorably discharged from the navy. This action led to other Stop Our Ship (SOS) campaigns in San Diego and other Navy ports in a wider effort to prevent navy ships from heading to Southeast Asia. "A strong resistance movement within the Seventh Fleet was led by COM and its local chapter."

== The Kodiak Chapter ==
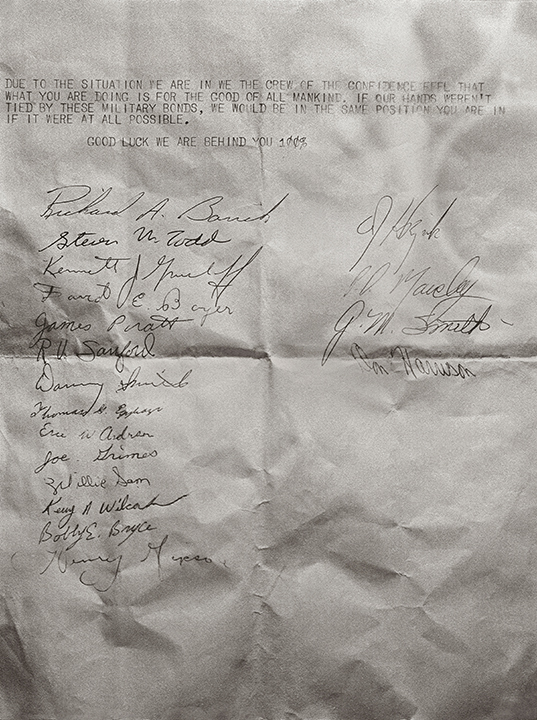
Support Letter to Greenpeace voyage from 18 crewmembers of USCGC Confidence 30 Sep 1971. Photo by Robert Keziere.

The chapter in Kodiak, Alaska, was the only one started from the beginning to include all ranks, modifying its name accordingly to Concerned Servicemen’s Movement (CSM). It was initiated by Lt(jg) Norman Bleier from the San Diego COM chapter after his commanding officer deemed him such a problem that he was transferred to Kodiak "to freeze until your enlistment is up." This was not an unusual tactic for the Navy as another member of the Kodiak group, EM3 James Kelly, was also ordered there after initiating a Congressional investigation against the Navy for ignoring his medical condition. And Kent, from the San Diego chapter, had also been given orders to Adak, Alaska, which he only avoided when a Federal Judge ordered the Navy to discharge him.

Kodiak CSM, which included both U.S. Navy and Coast Guard personnel, became the most influential GI dissent group in Alaska, both by publishing a well written underground newsletter, FID, and by playing a role in the founding of the influential environmental group Greenpeace. The group’s newsletter was named after a Fid, a traditional sailor's tool still used with knots and ropes. CSM considered FID a means to express its members First Amendment rights, while promoting discussion of the war, officer-enlisted relations, racism, and the ecology. The group had a number of sympathizers onboard the U.S. Coast Guard Cutter Confidence. Ironically, the Confidence was ordered to intercept and board the very first Greenpeace boat which was on its way to protest a powerful U.S. nuclear underground test on the island of Amchitka in 1971. Eighteen Confidence crewmen penned and then smuggled aboard a letter of support for the Greenpeace crew and voyage. Its message was clear, "Good luck. We are behind you one hundred percent." Shouts of "The U.S. Coast Guard is on our side" were heard on the protest vessel. This sympathetic action helped influence the members of the Greenpeace crew to found the organization we know today.

== Significance ==
At its height, COM had as many as 28 chapters in all the military branches and has been estimated to have "had approximately 3,000 members, including many supporters from the enlisted ranks." At one point it even had a chapter in the Pentagon. It had no formal leadership, although various people stepped forward at different times to play central roles. COM did not attract the media attention as dramatically as its more well-known partner and ally, Vietnam Veterans Against the War, but it played a key and underappreciated role in the antiwar movement of the early 1970s. The fact that officers not only resisted the war, but spoke out publicly and formed a significant organization, speaks to the depth of the anti-Vietnam War and anti-U.S. military sentiment in the U.S. at the time.

== See also ==
- F.T.A. – documentary film about the FTA Show
- GI's Against Fascism
- GI Coffeehouses
- GI Underground Press
- Intrepid Four
- Movement for a Democratic Military
- Presidio mutiny
- Sir! No Sir!, a documentary about the anti-war movement within the ranks of the United States Armed Forces
- The Spitting Image, a 1998 book by Vietnam veteran and sociology professor Jerry Lembcke which disproves the widely believed narrative that American soldiers were spat upon and insulted by antiwar protesters
- United States Servicemen's Fund
- Waging Peace in Vietnam
- Winter Soldier Investigation
- Donald W. Duncan
- Fort Hood Three
- Fort Lewis Six
- Court-martial of Howard Levy
