= GI's Against Fascism =

First antiwar and resistance group within the U.S. Navy during the Vietnam War

Logo of Duck Power, official organ of GI's Against Fascism

GI's Against Fascism was a small but formative organization formed within the United States Navy during the years of conscription and the Vietnam War. The group developed in mid-1969 out of a number of sailors requesting adequate quarters, but coalesced into a formal organization with a wider agenda: a more generalized opposition to the war and to perceived institutional racism within the U.S. Navy. Although there had been earlier antiwar and GI resistance groups within the U.S. Army during the Vietnam era, GI's Against Fascism was the first such group in the U.S. Navy. The group published an underground newspaper called Duck Power as a means of spreading its views.

By late 1969 they merged with a group of marines at Camp Pendleton to form the Movement for a Democratic Military (MDM) and continued publishing their newspaper until the middle of 1970. Although short-lived, because they were pioneers within the U.S. Navy and helped found the influential MDM, they had an important impact on later expressions of dissent within the U.S. military and the overall anti-Vietnam War movement.

== Organizational history ==
=== Background ===
In April 1969, some of the enlisted men of VS-41 stationed at North Island Naval Air Station in San Diego found their barracks in terrible condition. The paint was peeling, the toilets and sinks were clogged up, most showers didn't work, and the place was infested with cockroaches. "Quite simply, our living conditions were intolerable", later wrote Robert Mahoney, an African American enlisted man, who had been picked as spokesman by 5 or 10 other enlisted men to explain their grievances. Mahoney raised their complaints to an inspecting officer. This led to rapid improvements of the quarters: the building was cleaned up and painted, the bathrooms and showers were repaired, and a cubicle was converted to a reading or study room. But it also led, according to Mahoney, to unwanted attention for the group—and Mahoney in particular—as "troublemakers".

=== Racism in the military ===
Within VS-41 and across North Island, sailors, especially African Americans, experienced selective discrimination as personal posters of respected African Americans of the time, like Huey Newton and Malcolm X, were confiscated and destroyed, while white sailors’ posters of anti-establishment people like Bob Dylan or of nude women remained untouched. When confronted, a Chief Petty Officer who had destroyed some posters said "Yeah, I did it, because it was commie literature." In addition, when a senior officer was told of racial incidents involving white sailors calling other whites "n___ lovers" for hanging out with blacks, the officer demanded to know why the white sailor would want to hang out with blacks. All of this convinced Mahoney and two other enlisted men of the need to fight back and to educate their fellow sailors.

=== Duck Power ===
Mahoney, Tom Csekey and Andy Carlson, started smuggling copies of radical and antiwar newspapers onto the Navy base. They knew it could be a violation of military regulations to distribute literature of this kind on a military installation, but felt it was worth the risk and were willing to go to jail if caught. This activity created a furor among the Navy officers and lifers and convinced the three they were doing something important.

With the help and encouragement from the staff of the San Diego Free Press, a local underground newspaper, they decided to start their own newspaper. In August 1969 they published the first issue of Duck Power, which they named by combining a well-known radical expression of the times, "Power to the People", with Duck, a Navy slang word for an enlisted sailor. They called themselves "GI's Against Fascism" because they believed the treatment they had received in the military resembled fascism more than democracy. In all, 15 issues of Duck Power were published, with the last one appearing in July 1970.

=== Retaliation ===
The Navy was not happy about all the political activity and stepped up its retaliation. On July 17, 1969, the commanding officer of the North Island Naval Air Station issued an order banning the posting or distribution of any literature not officially authorized or printed by the station administrative office. Because this new order did not specify the content of the banned literature it effectively prohibited the sharing of non-political material as well. The local police were also accused by a group of faculty members from San Diego colleges of harassing sailors for distributing copies of Duck Power. The San Diego Faculty for Freedom of the Press circulated a statement alleging unwarranted arrests of sailors for "blocking sidewalks" and "illegal assembly" even when alone, as well as instances of sailors being turned over to the Shore Patrol "for questioning even when charged with nothing". Several threats of physical harm were delivered to the activists at different times. Csekey was transferred to Yuma, Arizona, arrested for distributing a banned publication, and sent back to San Diego to face a summary court-martial. Mahoney, for testifying in Csekey's defense, was punished by being given orders to the USS New Jersey, a battleship on its way to Vietnam.

=== Civilian support ===
A support movement among antiwar and other civilians had built up in the San Diego area for the Ducks, through which they received legal and political assistance. This included the support of local college and university faculty as mentioned above. In addition, the Ducks themselves had early on reached out to the news media which covered many of these developments and kept the light of public opinion on the Navy. In the end Csekey was convicted, demoted in rank and sentenced to twenty days at hard labor in the Navy brig, but received an honorable discharge. Mahoney received additional support through his family, avoided the danger of going to sea on an unfriendly ship, and was discharged honorably at the end of 1969.

== Legacy ==
Because it was the first such group in the Navy, GI's Against Fascism had a significant impact on subsequent antiwar and antimilitary efforts on U.S. ships and Naval bases. Early examples of dissent and antiwar activity within the military during the Vietnam War often had a reverberating impact on the overall antiwar movement and especially on later GI resisters. For example, many people paid attention and learned from Green Beret Master Sergeant Donald Duncan when he returned from Vietnam in 1966 saying publicly that "The Whole Thing was a Lie!" Similarly, also in 1966, three U.S. Army soldiers, known as the Fort Hood Three, influenced many when they refused to be deployed to Vietnam. In addition to being the first in the Navy, as founding members of MDM, the Ducks helped initiate one of the most well known and influential antiwar and GI resistance organizations in the Vietnam era.

== See also ==
- Concerned Officers Movement
- FTA Show - 1971 anti-Vietnam War road show for GIs
- F.T.A. - documentary film about the FTA Show
- GI Coffeehouses
- GI Underground Press
- Intrepid Four
- Movement for a Democratic Military
- Opposition to United States involvement in the Vietnam War
- Presidio mutiny
- Sir! No Sir!, a documentary about the anti-war movement within the ranks of the United States Armed Forces
- Stop Our Ship (SOS)
- Vietnam Veterans Against the War
- Donald W. Duncan
- Fort Hood Three
- Court-martial of Howard Levy
