= Fort Hood Three =

Three U.S. Army soldiers who refused to deploy to Vietnam in 1966

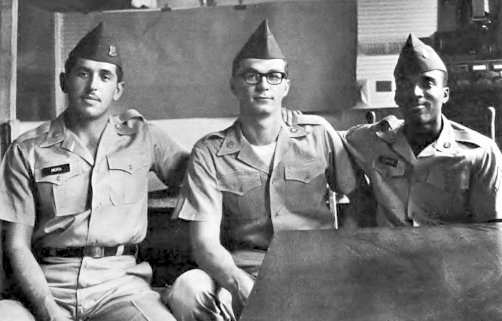
The Fort Hood Three refuse orders to go to Vietnam 1966

The Fort Hood Three were three United States Army soldiers – Private First Class James Johnson, Private David A. Samas, and Private Dennis Mora – who refused to be deployed to fight in the Vietnam War on June 30, 1966. This was the first public refusal of orders to Vietnam, and one of the earliest acts of resistance to the war from within the U.S. military. Their refusal was widely publicized (it was covered, for example, at least 20 times in the New York Times) and became a cause célèbre within the growing antiwar movement. They filed a federal suit against Secretary of Defense Robert S. McNamara and Secretary of the Army Stanley Resor to prevent their shipment to Southeast Asia and were court-martialed by the Army for insubordination.

== Background ==
The three were stationed together at Fort Hood, Texas, in the 142nd Signal Company, 2nd Armored Division. They were all from working-class backgrounds and have been called "a cross-section of Americans of color" because Johnson was black from Harlem in New York City, Mora was Puerto Rican from East or Spanish Harlem, and Samas was Lithuanian and Italian from Bakersfield, California and Chicago.

Mora, a graduate of the Bronx High School of Science and the City College of New York where he received a B.A. in history, joined the Welfare Department as a caseworker prior to being drafted into the Army. He had been in the antiwar movement before being drafted and even passed out antiwar leaflets at the induction center on his first day of processing. He also refused to sign the loyalty oath arguing that it was a violation of his Constitutional rights to be asked about organizational affiliations, but the Army insisted on taking him anyway. He came from a poor family and said, "the first war I knew was against the poverty of Spanish Harlem." He grew up angry at the discrimination, poor education, police brutality and unemployment he and his fellow Puerto Ricans experienced, describing the fight for "the reconstruction of our country's ghettoes and the meeting of our social and educational needs" as "the only battle which makes sense".

Samas grew up on the West Coast, the son of a trucking company employee who later went into the furniture business. He graduated from Bakersfield High School in California, spent time at Modesto Junior College, and was living in Chicago, IL when he was drafted.

Johnson's family came from the Virgin Islands. His father worked in direct mailing while his mother made $35 a week working such long hours the family "seldom saw her". He went to Saint Cecilias Parochial School and Rice High School and spent a year at Bronx Community College before becoming a teller at the Bronx Savings Bank and getting drafted.

Upon finding out they were to be sent to Vietnam, they prepared a joint statement which they delivered during a press conference in New York City.

== Public statements ==
On June 30, 1966, Mora read the public statement from all three about their refusal to be sent to Vietnam. They denounced the war as “immoral, illegal and unjust” Their statement read in part:

We represent in our backgrounds a cross section of the Army and of America. James Johnson is a Negro, David Samas is of Lithuanian and Italian parents, Dennis Mora is a Puerto Rican. We speak as American soldiers. We have been in the army long enough to know that we are not the only G.I.s who feel as we do. Large numbers of men in the service either do not understand this war or are against it.... We know that Negroes and Puerto Ricans are being drafted and end up in the worst of the fighting all out of proportion to their numbers in the population; and we have first hand knowledge that these are the ones who have been deprived of decent education and jobs at home.... We have made our decision. We will not be a part of this unjust, immoral, and illegal war. We want no part of a war of extermination. We oppose the criminal waste of American lives and resources. We refuse to go to Vietnam!!!!!!!

Mora also read his own statement where he proudly defended the right of "cannon fodder" to speak out and, more, defended the right of the Vietnamese people to national self-defense:

Contrary to what the Pentagon believes, cannon-fodder can talk. It is saying that we are not fighting for "freedom" in South Vietnam, but supporting a Hitler-loving dictator. It is saying that it will not accept as a rationale for exterminating a whole people, theories of dominoes, Chinese "aggression" or arguments of "appeasement." It further says that the only foreign power in Vietnam today is the United States and that the Vietcong is an indigenous force which has the support of most of the people and is in control of 80% of the country.

Johnson directly tied his antiwar stance to racial discrimination at home: "When the Negro soldier returns, he still will not be able to ride in Mississippi or walk down a certain street in Alabama." He also stated to a New York Times reporter the similarity between the fight of the Vietnamese and that of black Americans: "Just as the Negroes are fighting for absolute freedom and self-determination in the United States, so it is with the Vietnamese in their struggle against the Americans."

On July 7, 1966, the Three were once again scheduled to speak to supporters. Nearly 800 people turned out to the event, but on their way there Samas, Mora, and Johnson were arrested by military police.

== Civilian support ==
When the Three received orders to report to the Oakland Army Terminal for assignment to Vietnam they used Mora's connections in the antiwar movement to contact the Vietnam Peace Parade Committee, a large coalition of antiwar activists in New York City, for help. The antiwar activists, anticipating a reaction from the military, proceeded to form the Fort Hood Three Defense Committee and mobilized legal help for the Three. The June 30 press conference where the Three presented their initial statement was attended by Stokely Carmichael, chairman of the Student Nonviolent Coordinating Committee and Lincoln Lynch the public relations director of Congress of Racial Equality. Within weeks the antiwar movement, nationally and internationally, had taken up their cause.

Pete Seeger, the folk singer and social activist, wrote a song for them called the Ballad Of The Fort Hood Three, which included the lines:

Come all you brave Americans and listen unto me,
If you can spare five minutes in this 20th century,
I'll sing to you a story true as you will plainly see
It's about three U.S. soldiers they call the "Fort Hood Three."

We’ve been told in training that in Vietnam we must fight;
And we may have to kill women and children, and that is quite all right;
We say this war’s illegal, immoral, and unjust;
We’re taking legal action, just the three of us.

We’ll report for duty but we won’t go overseas.
We’re prepared to face court martial, but we won’t fight for Ky.
We three have talked it over, our decision now is clear,
We will not go to Vietnam, we’ll fight for freedom here.

During the court cases and prison time for the Three numerous demonstrations were held in their support. Shortly after their arrest, some 250 protesters marched at the main gates to Fort Dix in New Jersey where they were being held in the military prison. Once the Three were transferred to Leavenworth military prison in Kansas, Kansas City antiwar activists organized protests outside the prison. On January 7, 1967, close to 100 demonstrators marched and sang songs to show their support for the Three.

== Legal cases ==
The court cases of the Fort Hood Three were among several early legal trials during the Vietnam War involving U.S. military personnel refusing orders and going to jail. The Three underwent two separate legal proceedings with numerous stages as they both sued the government in Federal Court while being court-martialed by the military. They argued in their suit and courts-martial that the war was illegal and immoral, while the military charged them with refusing direct orders to board a plane bound for Vietnam. The Federal suit was filed on June 30, 1966, in Washington, D.C., the same day as their initial public announcement. The suit, an application for a permanent injunction to bar the military from shipping them to Southeast Asia, was filed by their attorney, Stanley Faulkner. However, because the Three were ordered to board the plane before their suit could be heard, they were court-martialed before their hearing in Federal Court.

The military at first considered charging the Three with the "uttering of disloyal statements with intent to cause disaffection and disloyalty among the members of the military service and civilian population." They had been arrested and held under "administrative restriction" at Fort Dix in New Jersey while the Army deliberated. Instead, on July 14, 1966, the Army released them with orders to board a plane at McGuire Air Force Base bound for Vietnam. When the Three refused this order, they were rearrested and charged with "insubordination." The Three's attorney said "he believed the Army carefully maneuvered his clients into a court-martial situation", probably preferring to avoid the legal issues around free speech.

=== Federal suit ===
Meanwhile, the suit in Federal court had already run into serious trouble. On July 11, a Federal District judge had thrown it out without even allowing arguments to proceed for more than 15 minutes. The judge cut off the Three's attorney in mid-argument and read from a prepared opinion, "it is not the function of the judiciary to entertain such litigation which challenges the validity, the wisdom or the propriety of the Commander in Chief of our armed forces". The NY Times noted that "it was rare for a judge here to dismiss a case on his own motion at such an early stage in the proceedings." The Three quickly appealed to the United States Court of Appeals for the District of Columbia Circuit, but were again rebuffed. On November 6, 1967, the case made its way to the Supreme Court as Mora v. McNamara (389 U.S. 934) which refused to hear it. William O. Douglas and Potter Stewart, however, dissented arguing that the Court should look into the issue of the legality of the war.

=== Courts-martial ===
Their courts-martial, the first of their kind in the U.S. military during the Vietnam War, took place quickly in late September 1966. During three separate trials over three days, they each argued the war was illegal and immoral. They all cited the Nuremberg Code as precedent and Samas said, “The way I was brought up was to judge things with my conscience, and that is what I did.” The men were defended as "counterpoints to Adolf Eichmann", the infamous Nazi who justified his war crimes by saying he was just following orders. The presiding Army law officer dismissed any argument about the legality of the war with the statement: "I rule that it is a matter of law, that the war in Vietnam is legal, and I forbid you to argue that it isn't." The military court, then, convicted them of insubordination and gave each a dishonorable discharges and forfeiture of pay. Mora was sentenced to three years at hard labor, Samas and Johnson to five. Their appeal the next September before the United States Court of Military Appeals was denied. The court's opinion said, "The legality under international law of the American presence in Vietnam is not a justiciable issue." Stanley Faulkner, the Three's lawyer, responded, "Sustaining the President's power to conduct an undeclared war 10,000 miles from our shores resembles the unlimited powers once held by kings and more recently in our history by dictators." In July 1967, both Samas and Johnson had their sentences reduced to three years by a military review board.

== Impact ==
The actions of The Fort Hood Three, because they occurred so early in the war, have been called "a turning point in the broader antiwar movement" and "the beginning of a rank-and-file upsurge against military authority and [the] war." Because they reached out to and received significant support from the civilian antiwar movement, they "helped to forge an enduring alliance between antiwar GIs and the civilian antiwar movement that encouraged thousands more GIs to join the resistance." Further, as they made clear in their initial statements, their opposition to the war was connected to their recognition of racial disparities in the military and the country as a whole. "They were some of the earliest antiwar protesters to really connect opposition to the war abroad to the fight for racial equality at home." Years later, Johnson pointed out the parallel between the Three's position and Muhammad Ali's famous statement made the same year: "No Vietcong ever called me nigger." By defending the right of the Vietnamese people to self determination, they were also setting an early precedent for future military resisters.

== See also ==
- Concerned Officers Movement
- Donald W. Duncan
- Fort Lewis Six
- FTA Show - 1971 anti-Vietnam War road show for GIs
- F.T.A. - documentary film about the FTA Show
- GI's Against Fascism
- G.I. coffeehouses
- GI Underground Press
- Movement for a Democratic Military
- Opposition to United States involvement in the Vietnam War
- Presidio mutiny
- Sir! No Sir!, a documentary about the anti-war movement within the ranks of the United States Armed Forces
- Soldiers in Revolt: GI Resistance During the Vietnam War, book about soldier & sailor resistance during the Vietnam War
- Stop Our Ship, an anti-Vietnam War movement in and around the U.S. Navy
- USS Sumter Three
- Vietnam Veterans Against the War
- Waging Peace in Vietnam
- Winter Soldier Investigation
