= Carl Dix =

American communist (born 1948)

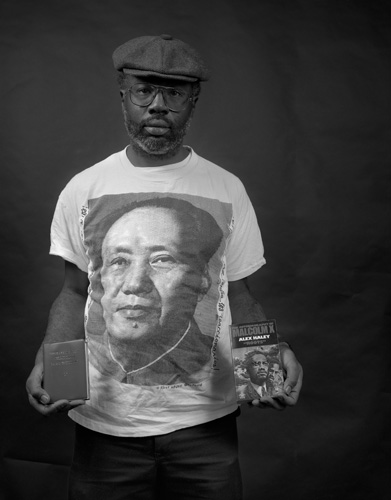
- Carl Dix photo by William Short from A Matter of Conscience
- Born: Carl Dix; 1948 (age 77–78); Baltimore, Maryland
- Political party: Revolutionary Communist Party, USA

Carl Dix (born 1948) is an American communist who was a founding member, and a representative, of the Revolutionary Communist Party, USA (RCP). He is a regular contributor to Revolution newspaper and a longtime associate of Bob Avakian.

In 1996, Dix co-founded the October 22nd Coalition to Stop Police Brutality, Repression and the Criminalization of a Generation. Dix along with Cornel West was a central figure in the campaign to Stop "Stop and Frisk" aimed at opposing the New York City stop-and-frisk program to stop hundreds of thousands of people in New York City and frisk them.

Dix is a member of Refuse Fascism, a coalition group co-initiated by the RCP in 2016 to drive out the Trump administration. Dix was also a member of the Black Workers Congress, the African Liberation Support Committee, and Vietnam Veterans Against the War.

== Early life ==
Dix grew up in an African-American working class community of West Baltimore, Maryland. He was drafted into the U.S. Army in 1968 while attending college and at the height of the Vietnam War. He received orders to report to Fort Bragg Army base in North Carolina. He recalled in an oral history heading onto the base for the first time and seeing a big sign on the side of the road just outside the gate, "Welcome to KKK Country". He thought to himself "what did they get us into here?" He was influenced by the black consciousness movement of the times, including Malcolm X's critique of the United States for talking about being for justice while oppressing people in other countries like the Vietnamese, "especially when your people are oppressed at home in America." Dix reached a crossroads in December 1969 when during the same month he received orders to report for Vietnam and also heard about the police murder of Fred Hampton in Chicago and the police attack on the Black Panther headquarters in Los Angeles. He thought, "this war isn't just something over there, it's here too, and I have to decide what side I'm on. I decided I couldn't be part of the war in Vietnam, I couldn't go fight for America."

== Refusal, courts-martial and prison ==
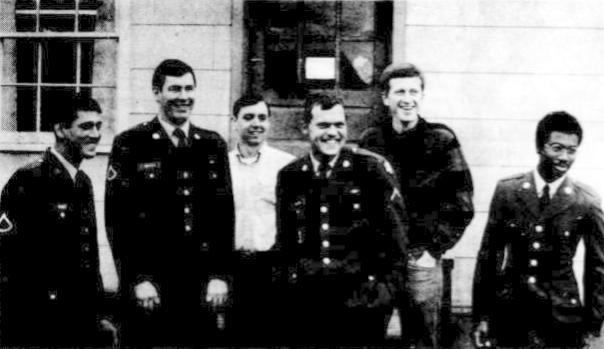
The Fort Lewis Six arrested in June 1970 for refusing orders to Vietnam.

He was one of six GIs who refused orders to go to Vietnam in June 1970 and faced courts-martial. This was the largest mass refusal of direct orders to Vietnam during the war and they became known as the Fort Lewis Six. Dix was immediately thrown into the military stockade at the base for pre-trial confinement, an unusual move contrary to military regulations. The local GI underground newspaper, the Lewis-McChord Free Press reported that base "regulation 27-2 explicitly states that pre-trial confinement is to be used only when there is danger" of self-harm or flight, neither of which applied to Dix. And things went downhill from there according to Dix. In their courts-martial, "The military judge made it very clear he wasn't listening. He says, 'You guys can make your arguments for the record, I am not going to consider them, I don't care what you have to say'". Dix was imprisoned for two years in Leavenworth Military Penitentiary. He commented at the time, "I just have to exist, to be my own man, and accept the consequences. If I had continued to participate in the Army, I wouldn't be able to relate to myself or humanity."

It was during his incarceration that he became a revolutionary. One of the first things that happened to him at Leavenworth was a beating by prison guards. As Dix described in a letter to his attorney, "Sgt. Davis told me to stand in a yellow square and face the wall, which I did. Specialist Bartlett approached me from the right and questioned me as to why I wasn't standing at the position of parade rest." Dix hadn't received an order to stand at parade rest and said so. This led to what Dix described as an unprovoked assault from both guards during which he "was struck in the back several times" and thrown "to the floor". Dix was then charged and sentenced by prison officials with "assault on a guard and disobeying an order to stand at parade rest."

After his release from Leavenworth, Dix returned to Baltimore and worked and organized at the Bethlehem Steel plant at Sparrows Point from 1973 to 1978.

== Political activities ==
In 2011 Dix played a key role in initiating the "Stop Mass Incarceration Network" and wrote "Taking the Movement of Resistance to Mass Incarceration to a Higher Level Thru Unleashing Determined Mass Resistance". Dix, together with Cornel West, author and journalist Herb Boyd, Efia Nwangaza of the Malcolm X Center in Greenville, North Carolina, and Rev. Omar Wilkes, issued a statement "From Up Against the Wall to Up in Their Faces: STOP – "STOP & FRISK" calling for a campaign against at the New York Police Department's "Stop and Frisk" program. On October 21, 2011, over 30 people, including Dix and West, were arrested at the NYPD's 28th Police Precinct in a mass act of non-violent civil disobedience. Earlier that day Dix posted an article on The Huffington Post about why he was going to participate in the protest.

== See also ==
- Concerned Officers Movement
- Court-martial of Howard Levy
- Court-martial of Susan Schnall
- Donald W. Duncan
- Fort Hood Three
- Free The Army tour
- GI's Against Fascism
- GI Coffeehouses
- GI Underground Press
- Movement for a Democratic Military
- Opposition to United States involvement in the Vietnam War
- Presidio mutiny
- Sir! No Sir!, a documentary about the anti-war movement within the ranks of the United States Armed Forces
- Stop Our Ship (SOS) anti-Vietnam War movement in and around the U.S. Navy
- Vietnam Veterans Against the War
- Waging Peace in Vietnam
- Winter Soldier Investigation
