= Fort Dix 38 =

U.S. Army soldiers accused of rioting

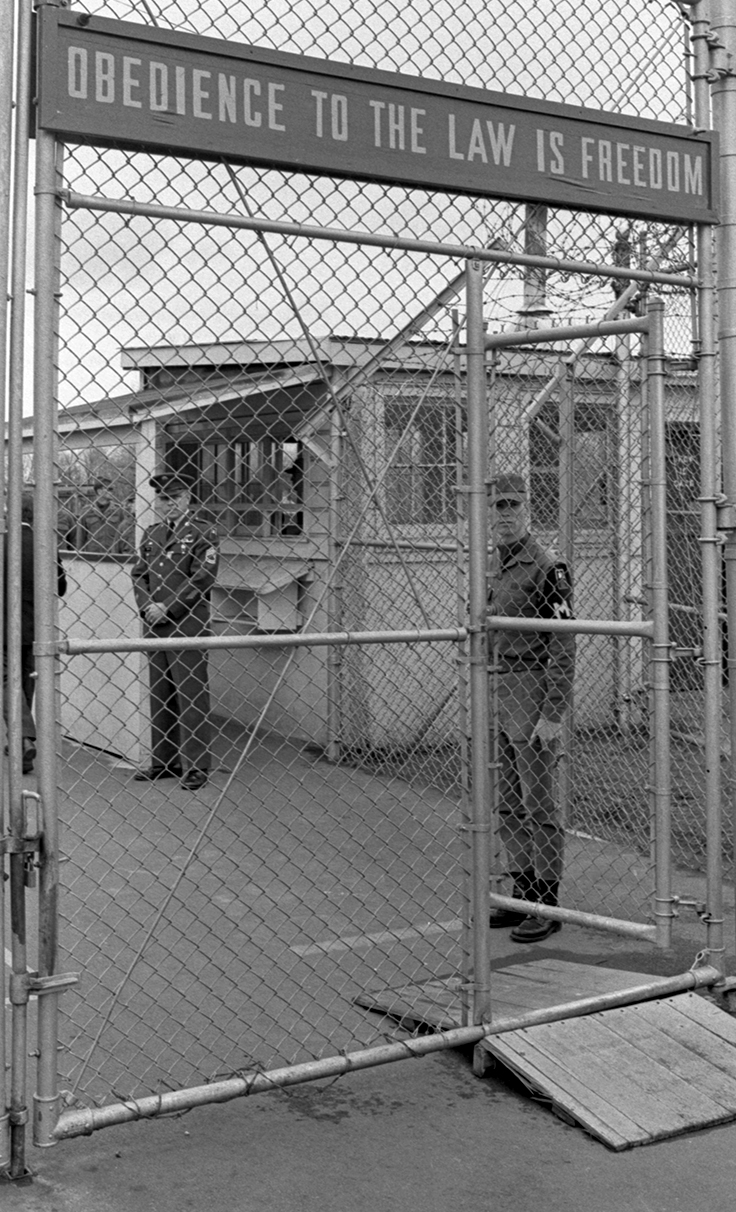
Fort Dix Stockade Entrance Sign 1969 - Obedience to the Law is Freedom. Photo by David Fenton

On June 5, 1969, during the height of the Vietnam War and the soldier and sailor resistance to it, 250 men rioted in the military stockade at U.S. Army post Fort Dix located near Trenton, New Jersey. The prisoners called it a rebellion and cited grievances including overcrowding, starvation, beatings, being chained to chairs, forced confessions and participation in an unjust war. One soldier said you can only treat us "like animals for so long", while another described "unbearable circumstances". The Army initially called it a "disturbance" caused by a small number of "instigators" and "troublemakers", but soon charged 38 soldiers with riot and inciting to riot. The antiwar movement, which had been increasingly recognizing and supporting resistance to the war within the military, quickly moved to defend the rebels/rioters and those the Army singled out for punishment. On June 18, the Army announced charges against 38 soldiers for "participating in a riot", "destruction of Government property, arson and conspiracy to riot." Soon the slogan "Free the Fort Dix 38" was heard in antiwar speeches, written about in underground newspapers and leaflets, and demonstrations were planned.

== Background ==
In 1969, Fort Dix was the largest military base in the northeastern U.S. and was one of the principal basic training sites for soldiers destined for Vietnam. The base contained a mock Vietnam village where search and destroy and other Vietnam-specific mission training was conducted. The Army initially claimed the stockade, where the riot occurred, "housed about 150 men" but it soon came out there were "747 men" in a facility built for 250. Ninety percent of the prisoners were there for being AWOL or Absent Without Leave. And only five percent were "charged with what would be classified as crimes in civilian practice (homicide, rape, larceny etc.)" A sign at the stockade front gate said "Obedience to the Law is Freedom". The photographer who took a photo of the sign and the gate called it a "Mussolini-like slogan". The Army, apparently embarrassed when the photo was widely published, ordered it removed.

== Conditions in the Stockade ==
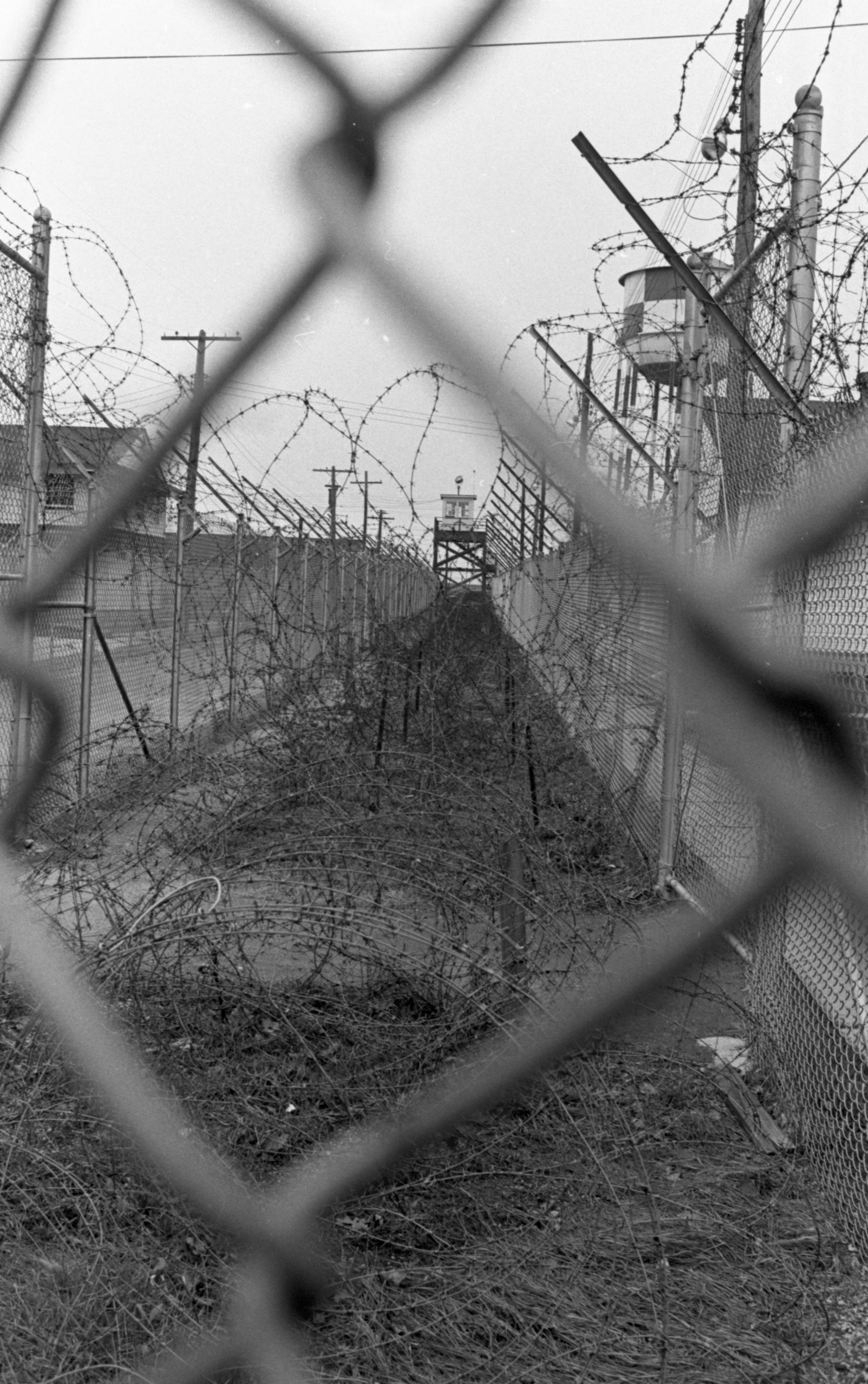
Fort Dix Stockade Surrounded by Barbed Wire 10 feet high. Photo by David Fenton.

The stockade consisted of a number of World War II era wooden barracks which had been condemned twenty years earlier. Much of the wood had rotted and the buildings were infested with bugs. The facility was surrounded with dirt, gravel and rolls of rusty barbed wire ten feet high and six feet wide. Many windows would no longer close, the heating was erratic, the plumbing failed regularly, and there was rarely enough food to go around. Prisoners described the food as "horrible". One who had been in four different stockades said "the food here is worse than I've ever experienced." Prisoners disciplined for even minor infractions were placed in solitary confinement on a severely restricted diet which was described by the Army as "balanced portions of all items in the regular daily ration prepared and served other prisoners except meat, fish, poultry, eggs, butter, sweets, desserts, milk and milk products, fruit, fruit and vegetable juices, sugar, salt, pepper, catsup and mustard." Water was the only drink.

These conditions were not the prisoners biggest complaints; even worse, they felt, "were the harassment, racism and cruelty of many of the guards and of the commandant of the stockade." A common punishment meted out by the guards was "the strap", which was described this way:

"The prisoners hands and feet were bound together behind his back. He was then thrown about and beaten by the guards, then dropped repeatedly on his face and stomach (since the strap prevented his using his hands to break the fall."

The Army initially denied and downplayed any problems at the stockade. According to Major Andrew Casey, the officer in charge, the food served the prisoners was "the same as that eaten by soldiers" in the Fort's mess halls. He also made light of any reports of cruelty or brutality by the prison staff. "Sure we have guards who hassle the prisoners", but "Whenever they're caught at it, we discipline them. The trick is to catch them." Investigations later confirmed many of the charges (see below).

== Rebellion/Riot ==
After breakfast on the day of the riot, the guards ordered all the prisoners to stand spread eagle against a wire fence to be frisked from head to foot. The inmates were then required to stand in formation under direct sunlight in the prison compound for three hours without water. At lunch, they were marched into the cafeteria, witnessing enroute the guards kicking and beating a popular inmate. At the mess hall they were forced to stand for another half-hour, again without water, and then fed lunch with nothing to drink. When one of the prisoners, a respected inmate named Chobot, stood and demanded water, others joined in and started yelling for water. The guards regained order and marched the soldiers back to their cell block, except for Chobot who was taken to solitary confinement. Again the prisoners were ordered out into the main compound to stand at rigid parade rest in formation under the sun for four more hours, still with no water. Temperatures were reported to up to 90 degrees that day. While the prisoners stood, the guards searched all the cells, confiscating non-Army issued and disallowed personal items, even toothpaste and shaving cream, and excess personal letters (only ten per prisoner were allowed). Meanwhile, another prisoner was beaten and dragged off towards segregation, where an ambulance was seen coming to pick him up. Once back in their cell blocks, the details and anger about all these events rapidly spread and intensified among the prisoners. A short time later, the inmates in Cell Block 67 exploded in anger. The mood soon spread to two other cell blocks with prisoners throwing footlockers out windows, smashing furniture and burning mattresses. Cries of "We want Chobot" and "Viva la Revolucion!" were heard. The rebellion was eventually suppressed by about 250 MPs with teargas and bayonets. No guards or prisoners were injured, none of the prisoners attacked any guards; all the frustration and anger was directed against property. The Army later concluded that $3,585 worth of damage had occurred in the stockade, indicating that the actual damage was relatively minor.

== Military investigation and charges ==
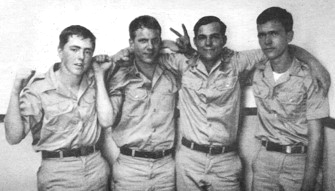
Four of the five Fort Dix 38 who faced the most serious charges. Left to right: Tom Catlow, Terry Klug, Jeffery Russell and Bill Brakefield.

With little definite knowledge about who had done what, the Army investigators began to look for evidence against those they considered the likely troublemakers. Terry Klug, who was later acquitted of all charges in connection with the riot, quickly found himself accused of being a ringleader. During his first interview with agents from the Army's CID (Criminal Investigation Division) he was told they had been waiting for him and had heard his name "over and over". They questioned him about articles he had written for The Bond, the paper of the American Servicemen's Union, and other GI underground newspapers. They also assured him they had enough statements implicating him in the riot to put him away for life. Later when Klug spoke with other prisoners, many confirmed they had been told if they signed statements against him they could get out of the stockade. Klug was the first prisoner separated out into segregation as a ringleader, and one of the 38 eventually charged. At first he thought he was going to be the only one, but as he sat in solitary all night he heard others being brought in and locked up nearby. A prisoner named Doug Sopata reported being offered a blank piece of paper to sign. He was told if he signed he could be out in a few weeks even though he was facing two years for desertion. Sopata looked at the paper - it said Statement on the top and nothing else. "Sign it. We'll fill in the details," he was told. He refused and had his chair kicked out from under him and was threatened with "the Straps". He still refused. The Army initially announced to the public that 38 soldiers were being brought up on charges connected with the riot. The official charges were mutiny, conspiracy to mutiny, riot, conspiracy to riot, aggravated arson and destruction of government property. All 38 of those charged were placed in segregated isolation in cells eight feet by six feet by four feet. They were locked up like this for months, not having been found guilty or innocent, and most lost 50 or 60 pounds on what they described as "rabbit chow".

== Independent Investigations ==
In October 1969, Mario Biaggi, a former policeman and then Democratic congressman from New York, inspected the stockade and condemned the treatment of prisoners as "the most inhuman" he had ever seen. He felt they were being "treated worse than enemy prisoners." Hearing about the disciplinary diet described above, he said: "If this food were served to our prisoners of war it would probably be a violation of the Geneva Convention." Biaggi also said he had been told by prisoners of beatings and withholding of medical attention. The American Civil Liberties Union made similar allegations.

A civilian committee composed of six penologists was appointed by the Army to study their confinement methods. In a June 1970 report the committee recommended "a major overhaul of the Army prison system" and was particularly concerned with the Army's "outdated notions of penology." Zeroing in on the Fort Dix stockade, the committee found the maintenance and sanitation of the kitchen and mess hall "below standard" with mice in the dishwashing area and open sewer access holes filled with dirty water on the mess hall floor - one of them was "six feet long and about three feet deep." The New York Times described the picture painted by the report as "not a pretty one" and one "of tremendous neglect by the Army". All of this, the Times noted, was "especially disturbing" in light of the fact, as mentioned above, almost all the prisoners were there for being AWOL. The AWOL rates were, of course, very related to the Vietnam War. Starting in 1969, driven by broad and increasing civilian and military disaffection with the war, U.S. Army AWOL and desertion rates began rapidly increasing until by 1971 they were higher than at any other time in modern history.

== Support for the 38 ==
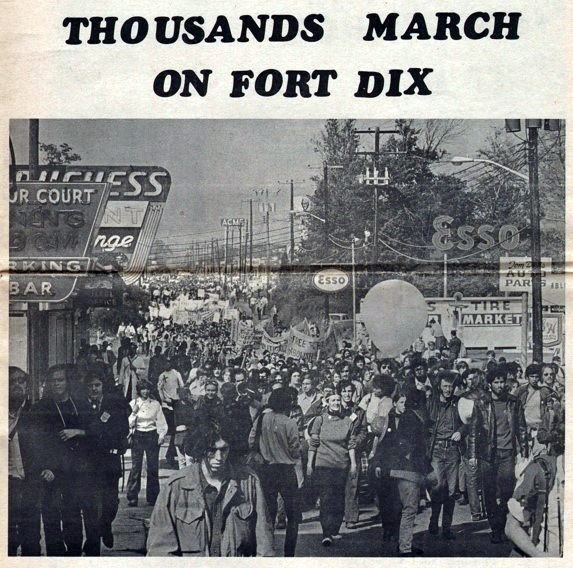
Free the Fort Dix 38 demonstration on October 12, 1969. From the cover of GI underground newspaper Shakedown, Oct. 17, 1969

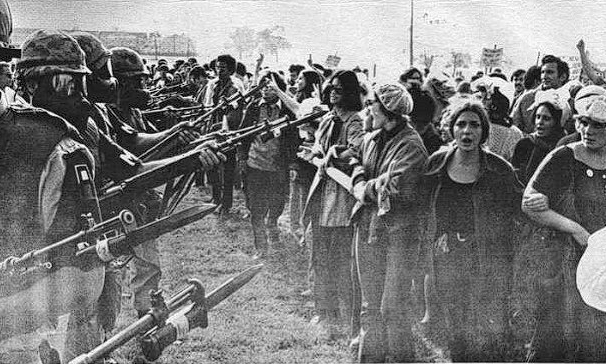
Bayonetted MPs confront Fort Dix 38 demonstrators

Support for the 38 developed early as news of the rebellion/riot spread, particularly within the antiwar movement but even more broadly as information about the conditions in the stockade became known. On October 12, 1969, a large demonstration was held at Fort Dix that involved somewhere between 4,000 and 10,000 people depending on the source. One author claimed it was the "largest held at a military base in the Northeast during the Vietnam War". It started at the nearby Fort Dix Coffeehouse, an antiwar GI Coffeehouse, and marched to the Fort's gate demanding freedom for the 38, an end to the war, the abolition of the stockade system and the release of all political prisoners. Over 20 radical and antiwar groups participated, including Students for a Democratic Society (SDS), the Black Panther Party the American Servicemen's Union, Veterans and Reservists for Peace in Vietnam, the Medical Committee for Human Rights, the Catholic Peace Fellowship, and a contingent of Quakers that had walked from Philadelphia. A "woman's brigade" of about 150 led the march. According to the New York Times, as the women marched towards the base front gate they veered across an empty field and onto the base heading towards the stockade. The Fort's information officer, Colonel A. J. Nealon said "it was the first time in his knowledge that demonstrators had entered Federal military property anywhere in the country." They were repelled by some of the 1,000 MPs on guard who moved into position with tear gas and fixed bayonets. The demonstration ended peacefully and there were no arrests.

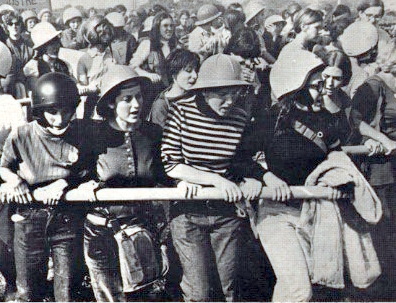
The women's brigade led the Free the Fort Dix 38 demonstration

=== Soldier Support for the 38 ===
The New York Times also took note of GI support for the demonstrators when they reported on a busload of soldiers who passed the departing demonstrators while holding victory signs and raised fists out the bus windows. Joan Crowell in her book-length study of the stockade conditions, the riot and the aftermath, interviewed many soldiers who were sympathetic to the demonstration. Leroi Conley, a Black soldier, told her "the support behind it on base was just incredible". "[W]e stuck out the windows and gave fists and screamed," he said. Even the Fort Dix information officers was quoted as saying, "They sure organized a hell of a fine march."

== Charges dropped, acquittals and four convictions ==
It soon became clear the Army's investigators faced a lack of evidence. Of the original 38, only five were brought before a general court-martial on serious charges. Most had their charges dropped entirely, while nine faced a special court-martial, the military equivalent of misdemeanor court. Four of those were convicted of misdemeanor participation in a riot and the other five acquitted. The five singled out for general courts-martial faced potential maximum sentences of up to 50 years each. All five had made political statements against the war and/or against the military, and some observers were convinced this was why they were singled out. Their trials began in November 1969. As mentioned above, Terry Klug was acquitted completely, although he did do prison time for his original AWOL charge. Tom Catlow was convicted for riot and arson and sentenced to a dishonorable discharge and forfeiture of pay; however, this was overturned in September 1971 by the Army Court of Military Review. Jeffery Russell, a Buddhist who said he could not kill and had applied to be a conscientious objector, was convicted of arson and riot and sentenced to three years at hard labor and a dishonorable discharge. Bill Brakefield, a pacifist, was convicted of riot and arson and sentenced to three years hard labor with a bad conduct discharge. Carlos Rodriguez Torres was convicted of throwing a mattress onto a fire, a lesser charge than any of the other four faced, and yet he was sentenced to four years at hard labor, a bad conduct discharge and loss of pay - the most severe sentence given to any of the defendants. The antiwar movement and GI underground press considered him "the victim of racism."

== See also ==
- A Matter of Conscience
- Concerned Officers Movement
- Court-martial of Susan Schnall
- Donald W. Duncan
- Fort Hood Three
- FTA Show - 1971 anti-Vietnam War road show for GIs
- GI Coffeehouses
- Movement for a Democratic Military
- Opposition to United States involvement in the Vietnam War
- Presidio mutiny
- Sir! No Sir!, a documentary about the anti-war movement within the ranks of the United States Armed Forces
- Stop Our Ship (SOS) anti-Vietnam War movement in and around the U.S. Navy
- Vietnam Veterans Against the War
- Waging Peace in Vietnam
