= Thomas Hutson (sea captain) =

Quaker Sea Captain

Thomas Hutson (circa 1624-1697) was a Quaker sea captain who brought settlers to the William Penn Colonies in Colonial America. His "great" ship Elizabeth, Ann, and Catherine arrived in Philadelphia in 1682, nearly a month before the ship Welcome, which carried William Penn. Penn granted Thomas at least 5000 acres of land in present-day Bucks County, Pennsylvania in 1683, immediately adjacent to land of the Society of Traders company. At the time of his Penn land grant in 1683, Thomas indicated that he was from Sutton, Surrey, UK. During his lifetime, he travelled frequently to Barbados. He died in London, England in 1697, leaving several descendants connected to Barbados church and census records.

During the Anglo-Dutch War of 1672-1674, Captain Thomas Hutson refused to carry guns on his merchant ship as a matter of conscience. In 1677, his West Indies ship Patience was captured by local pirate leaders in Algiers (present-day Algeria). Captain Hutson told the local authorities that "he could not have a passport where he came from in England without swearing, and that his conscience would not admit of." The goods from the ship were confiscated by the local (Turkish Dey) authorities in Algiers, and Captain Hutson was left "with the painful prospect of facing the irate merchants, deceived of their profits, with the argument of his tender conscience."

== Chronology ==
- 1635 A Thomas Hudson travelled to Barbados on the ship Expedition November 20, 1635. He is listed as having been 16 (i.e. b ca 1619), which could roughly-align with a documented death date of 1697 at age 73. As this record appears in "Hotten's List", he may have been a "stolen child" or an indentured servant. Both were common on such voyages at the time.
- 1659 Emmanuel Hutson (1659-1691) is born to Captain Thomas Hudson. This eldest son will be referenced as deceased in the 1698 will of his brother John. Emmanuel's son is mentioned in the will as an heir to properties of John and Emmanuel's deceased father. Emmanuel's daughter Anne Hutson is also an heir to the "lands and tenements previously-owned by my deceased father in Dover." This is likely a reference to Dover beach in Christ Church, Barbados. The Hutson property was renamed Frere Pilgrim after Emmanuel died.
- 1663 John Hutson (1663-1709) born to Captain Thomas Hudson. His later will of 1698 shows him being of St. Edmunds, London, UK. In his will, he also grants part of his father's Dover to his wife Beulah and other descendants of his father Thomas Hutson.
- 1665 Thomas Hutson, Jr. born to Captain Thomas Hutson. He will be referred to as an executor of John Hudson's will made in St. Edmunds, London in 1698.
- 1671 Thomas Hutson from Barbados sends letters with George Fox to Quakers in England. This shows that he made a passage at that time from Barbados to England, or maybe that he had a home there.
- 1672 Mehittabell Hutson born to Captain Thomas Hutson. She will be referred to as an heir of the Dover lands in John Hutson's will of 1698.
- 1672 Captain Thomas Hutson refuses to arm his merchant ship in the Anglo-Dutch Wars of 1672-1674.
- 1677 Captain Thomas Hutson is involved in the Algiers incident, where he sacrifices his ship's cargo in favor of his conscience, refusing to swear that he was a citizen of England (because his ship was merely that of an English colony in Barbados).
- 1678 A ticket is granted for John Claypool to travel from Barbados to London on Commander Thomas Hudson's ship Patience.
- 1679 A Thomas and William Hudson are listed in Regiment of Foot muster rolls in Barbados (different parishes), a Robert Hudson was listed but did not appear for muster.
- 1682 Captain Thomas Hutson's ship Elizabeth, Ann, and Catherine is one of three that brings settlers to the new Penn Colonies in America.
- 1683 Thomas Hudson is granted at least 5000 acres in Bucks County, Pennsylvania. This large tract appears in the Holmes map of 1687 near present-day Buckingham, Pennsylvania. Another smaller tract for Thomas Hudson is shown on the Delaware River, near present day Yardley, Pennsylvania. From "History of Bucks County, Pennsylvania" - "Thomas Hudson, 'a gentleman of Sutton, England,' Colonel Mildmay, of whom nothing is known, and to a corporation called the “ Free Society of Traders,” whose lands were sold to several purchasers some years later, and the corporation dissolved. Hudson’s grant from Penn, dated April 23d, 1683, for five thousand acres, was among the very first land located by an individual in what is now New Britain."
- 1685 Thomas Hudson the mariner said to be selling canvas in London.
- 1689 Thomas Hudson sells his 5000 acre tract in Bucks County, Pennsylvania to William Lawrence on March 1.
- 1695 Thomas Hudson retires to Gracechurch St, London (near the London Stone).
- 1695 Mehittabell Hutson marries Joel Gates, her entire family is listed in the Quaker marriage document (confirmed on Ancestry in 2023). Document says Mehittabell is daughter of Thomas Hudson of Gracechurch St.
- 1697 Thomas Hudson dies at age 73, and is likely buried at the Quaker Gardens in Moorgate, London, UK. His burial record in Quaker meetings indicate Southwark parish, which may have included other burial grounds. His will is proven on 24 November 1697.
- 1698 John Hutson drafts his will, granting his deceased father's lands in Dover (likely Barbados) to his brother and sister's families. It may be that this will was drafted when John was healthy, because his father had just died and the family wanted the land records probated before anything happened to John. Other records indicate that John did not die until 1709 (the will was proved in 1710, and is found in Barbados church records).
- 1698 The will of Quaker Thomas French of Wellingborough, New Jersey mentions John Hudson living next door to him, in land previously identified on a 1690 map as that of Robert Hudson. The birth and death dates of this John Hudson of Wellingborough align with the birth and death dates of John Hudson, son of Captain Thomas Hutson of Barbados. However, some records speculate that John Hudson of Wellingborough, NJ was the son of Robert Hudson and Mary (possibly Mary Thredder, also of London). Even if not direct cousins, these Quaker Hutson men could have been related to Captain Thomas Hutson.
- 1710 The will of John Hutson of St. Edmunds, London, son of Captain Thomas Hutson is proven and recorded in Barbados parish records, suggesting that John Hutson may have died around this time. His will grants his father Thomas Hutson's land in Dover (likely Barbados) to his siblings and their descendants.
