= Coffee Strong =

Coordinates: 47.1214°N 122.5540°W

Coffee Strong was a GI coffeehouse based on the tradition of resistance coffee houses opened during the Vietnam War by antiwar veterans and active duty soldiers in the United States. Based in Lakewood, Washington, it was founded in 2008 by veterans returning from the wars in Afghanistan and Iraq. It was located within 300 meters of the gates at Joint Base Lewis-McChord.

The Coffee Strong advisory board included linguist and dissident Noam Chomsky, Marjorie Cohn, Mike Ferner, Eva Golinger, Dahr Jamail, Antonia Juhasz, Col. Ann Wright (Ret.), and the late historian and author Howard Zinn. In 2011 filmmaker and professor of folklore and English at the University of Oregon Lisa Gilman released the film Grounds for Resistance about Coffee Strong and featured interviews by some of its founders and reactions to it from Joint Base Lewis-McChord soldiers.

== See also ==
- Under the Hood Café
- Iraq Veterans Against the War
- The Shelter Half
- GI Coffeehouses
