= A Matter of Conscience =

Artist book of oral histories of the Vietnam War veterans who resisted the war

A Matter of Conscience: GI Resistance During the Vietnam War
- Book Cover
- Authors: Oral histories by Willa Seidenberg and William Short, Photographs by William Short
- Language: English
- Subject: History, Opposition to United States involvement in the Vietnam War, Anti-war, Vietnam War
- Published: October 1992 (Addison Gallery of American Art)
- Publication place: United States
- Media type: Print (Paperback)
- Pages: 83 pages, 10.5 x 0.2 x 10.5 in, black and white photos and oral histories
- ISBN: 1879886324
- Website: https://amatterofconscience.com/A-Matter-of-Conscience/1

A Matter of Conscience: GI Resistance During the Vietnam War is an artist book published in 1992 at the time of the Addison Gallery of American Art exhibition, “A Matter of Conscience” and “Vietnam Revisited.” It contains oral histories of Vietnam era GIs, gathered and edited by Willa Seidenberg and William Short, and 58 photographs by William Short. Each oral history is complemented by a portrait in which the Vietnam veteran holds an object of some significance such as a newspaper clipping, a legal document, a book, or photograph. The large black and white photographs allow readers to see the veteran while reading the brief but moving oral histories to learn why they turned against the Vietnam War. The veterans' stories and portraits were collected over a five-year period and have been exhibited throughout the United States, Vietnam, Japan and Australia. A number of them were also included in the book Waging Peace in Vietnam: U.S. Soldiers and Veterans Who Opposed the War edited by Ron Carver, David Cortright, and Barbara Doherty. It was published in September 2019 by New Village Press. Also, the A Matter of Conscience oral history interviews with GI resisters were turned into an ongoing podcast, which started being in produced in 2025 for the 50th anniversary of the end of the Vietnam War.

== Contents ==
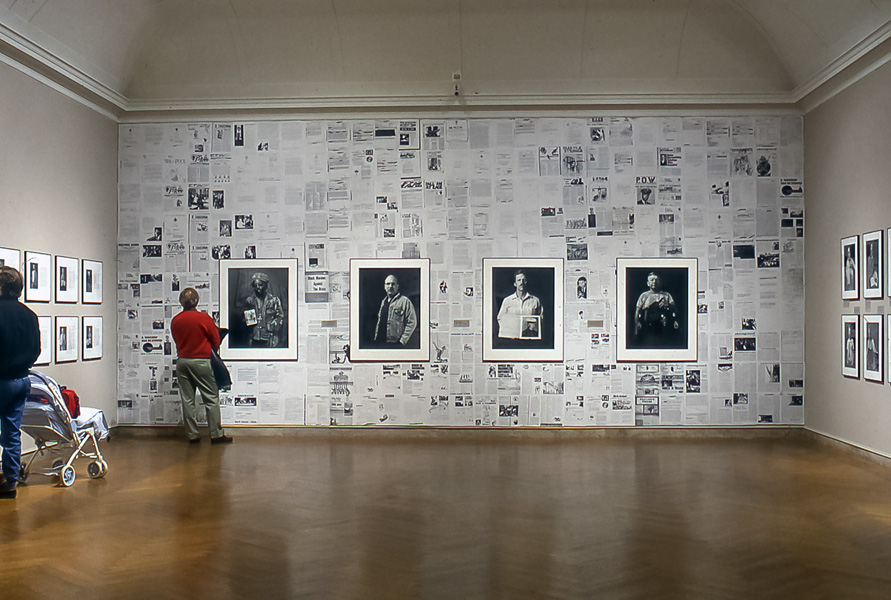
A Matter of Conscience Installation at the Addison Gallery of American Art 1992

The book contains 27 interviews collected from 1987 to 1992 with accompanying black and white photographs of each Vietnam veteran. A number of the subjects in the book were well known GI resisters during the war, including Carl Dix, one of six GIs who in June 1970 refused orders to Vietnam in the largest mass refusal of direct orders to Southeast Asia who became known as the Fort Lewis Six; Donald W. Duncan, a U.S. Army Special Forces (Green Beret) Master Sergeant who became one of the earliest opponents of the war and one of the antiwar movement leading public figures; Captain Howard Levy, an Army doctor who was court-martialed for refusing an order to train Green Beret medics on their way to Vietnam; Susan Schnall who in 1968, while a U.S. Navy Lieutenant, dropped antiwar leaflets over military bases and an aircraft carrier from a small plane and then, while in uniform, held a press conference and lead a mass peace march; Andy Stapp, known for organizing the American Servicemen's Union, an unofficial union for the U.S. military, in opposition to the Vietnam War; Keith Mather and Randy Rowland, two of the GIs involved in the Presidio mutiny, and Roger Broomfield, one of Presidio mutineers' guards in the military stockade. While many of the others in the book are lesser known, all together — the well known and those known mainly by their friends and family — represent a much larger demographic of GIs in the Vietnam era who resisted the war. The authors say they "represent only a fraction of the stories of GI resistance that might be told" and quote Defense Department figures that "as many as 503,926 incidents of desertion occurred between July 1, 1966 and December 31, 1973; compared with 191,840 reported cases of men refusing draft induction between 1963 and 1973."

The stories and images come from every branch of the U.S. military, most during the Vietnam era and a few from the Gulf War era.

=== Marines ===
We hear from Marines like Paul Atwood who expressed a deep fear of where he saw patriotism lead — "into mindless, unquestioning, uncritical acceptance of policy by governmental leaders". He bluntly concluded, "A more fucked up war couldn't be imagined." Atwood's photo shows him holding his ribbons and dog tags which he once felt stood for something good and now were "a symbol of its opposite."

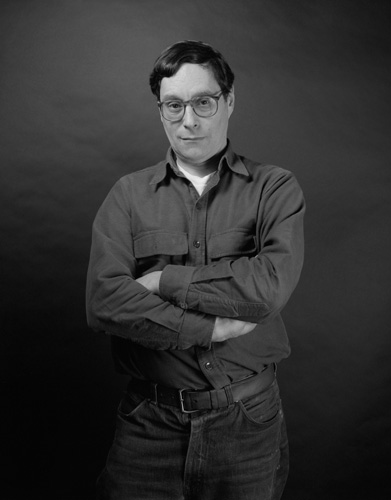
Howard Levy photo by William Short from A Matter of Conscience

And Steve Fournier who witnessed "Marines cutting ears and penises off enemy bodies and displaying them proudly." He "saw an eight-year-old boy shot in the leg for saying, 'Fuck you Marine,' and an 80-year-old woman beaten by a marine with his rifle butt." He describes coming home and going to his first antiwar demonstration where he apologized to the crowd for previously disparaging them. He told them he thought they were doing "something wonderful" and said he was proud to be with them. He received a "wonderful ovation" and felt "God, I'm home, I'm finally home."

Clarence Fitch recalled being influenced by the Black "consciousness" and "black power movement" of the times. He said the Black Marines segregated themselves in Vietnam, "we didn't want to integrate into what we considered the white man's war." He started looking at the enemy, "not so much as the enemy, but as another minority, brown people." In his photo he is wearing his Vietnam Veterans Against the War t-shirt.

=== Army ===
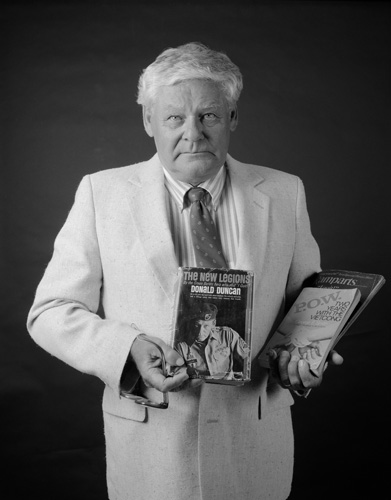
Donald Duncan photo by William Short from A Matter of Conscience

Captain Howard Levy became one of the most well known GI resisters during the Vietnam War when he refused to train combat medics. His photo radiates this defiance as we see him, arms crossed with a determined look on his face. During his court-martial he recalls trying "to put the war on trial, but the military court said the truth is no defense."

John Tuma was assigned to military intelligence and soon realized he was expected to participate in torturing the prisoners. When he refused and reported the use of a torture device he was transferred and then almost killed twice by his own side. His photo reveals a wiser and sadder man.

Andy Stapp, who burned his draft card while a student at Penn State, may seem like an unlikely Army enlistee. And he was — he agreed to be drafted in order to organize soldiers against the war. He gave the Army so much trouble they tried court-martialing and transferring him numerous times. In late 1967, he met with dissident GIs from nine different bases and started the American Servicemen's Union, which had ten demands, including an end to racism in the Army and the right to refuse illegal orders. His portrait shows him holding his autobiography Up Against the Brass and an Esquire magazine cover story about the Union.

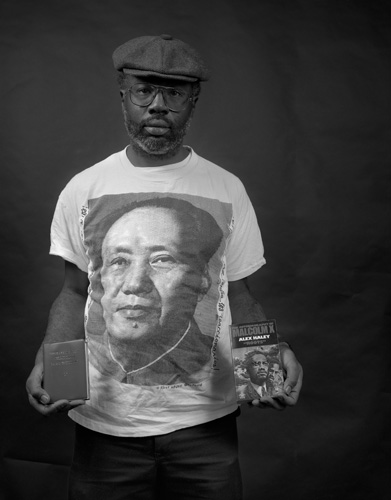
Carl Dix photo by William Short from A Matter of Conscience

Carl Dix, a Black man from Baltimore, recalls arriving at Fort Bragg in North Carolina and seeing a big sign outside the base — "Welcome to KKK Country". He had already been influenced by the "developing black consciousness" in the U.S., especially Malcolm X who spoke against Black Americans going to oppress the Vietnamese when they were being oppressed at home. He also read about police murdering Black Panther members in Chicago and Los Angeles and realized there was a war in the U.S. too. He knew he had to decide what side he was on. "I decided I couldn't be a part of the war in Vietnam. I couldn't go fight for America." In his photo he holds The Autobiography of Malcolm X in one hand and Mao Zedong's Little Red Book in the other while he wears a t-shirt with a large image of Mao on the front.

Green Beret Master Sergeant Donald Duncan spent 10 1/2 years in the U.S. Army before publicly announcing "I quit" on the cover of Ramparts Magazine. "The administration and the Generals were deceiving the American people and betraying its troops." His photo shows him holding that fateful issue of Ramparts along with his autobiography The New Legions.

Dave Cline recalls reading Donald Duncan autobiography The New Legions while recovering from an NVA bullet through his knee. Duncan "basically wrote we're fighting on the wrong side" — "it made a lot of sense to me". He returned home to organize other GIs against the war and join Vietnam Veterans Against the War. He is pictured holding the Fort Hood GI underground newspaper Fatigue Press.

Returning from Vietnam, Skip Delano was "very committed to fighting this whole machine that sent us there". He co-founded Left Face, the GI underground newspaper at Fort McClellan in Alabama and was one of 1,366 active-duty servicemen who signed an antiwar petition printed in The New York Times on November 9, 1969. In his photo he wears a button saying "To Hell with Rambo and all He Represents" and holds copies of Left Face.

Dave Blalock's photo shows him holding the full page in NY Times petition which Skip Delano had signed. He tells how seeing this led him, with several other guys in the 1st Cav, to organize the other GIs in their unit in Vietnam to wear black armbands. At the next morning's formation all the enlisted men and some of the doctors and helicopter pilots were wearing armbands - the commanding officer was so shocked he gave the whole unit the day off.

The picture of Terry Irvin shows him holding a GI underground newspaper called Free Press and a copy of the U.S. Declaration of Independence. And therein lies his story. He and other GIs had been trying unsuccessfully to get approval to distribute Free Press on Fort Lewis and McChord Air Base. In protest, about a dozen soldiers and some civilian supporters went to the base on the Fourth of July 1971 and distributed copies of the Declaration of Independence. Soon the military police showed up and arrested all the GIs. When it made national news that soldiers had been arrested for passing out he Declaration on the Fourth, all their charges were quietly dropped.

=== Navy and Air Force ===
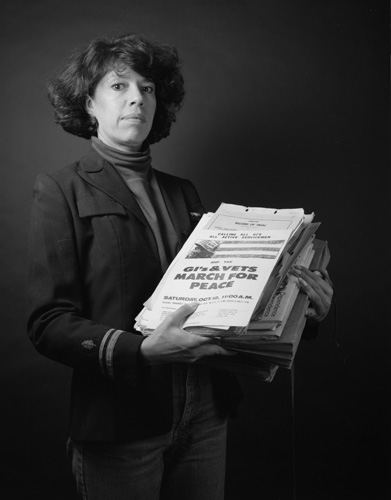
Susan Schnall photo by William Short from A Matter of Conscience

Susan Schnall signed on as a Navy nurse to provide good care for the young kids being "sent overseas and shot". She soon realized she was no longer just "patching up people" she was "promoting the war machine." She had read about B-52 bombers dropping leaflets on the Vietnamese and decided to do the same at home. Her portrait shows her holding some of the leaflets she dropped over San Francisco military bases from an airplane. She knew Navy regulations prohibited speaking politically while in uniform, but reasoned, "if General Westmoreland can wear his uniform before Congress asking for money for Vietnam, I can wear mine...speaking out against the war. I had as much right to freedom of speech as he does."

Charlie Clements graduated 2nd in his class in 1967 at the Air Force Academy. He flew more than 50 C-130 missions over Southeast Asia until the U.S. began covert military operations in Cambodia. While on a secret mission over Cambodia he looked out his plane and saw "vast areas that looked like the moon." He realized the U.S. was "conducting massive bombing operations there" and refused to fly anymore.

=== Gulf War ===
The portraits of three GI resisters from the Gulf War are included in the book. There stories are not told in detail but are described as similar to "those given by veterans who opposed the Vietnam War."

== Companion Book From Vietnamese Side ==
The book's editors also edited and took photographs for a companion book from the side of the Vietnamese called Memories of the American War: Stories From Vietnam. Published on the Matter of Conscience website, it has also been exhibited at several galleries. They interviewed 90 Vietnamese from all parts of the country over a three-year period on three extended trips to Viet Nam. The Los Angeles Times commented about Short's process with the Vietnamese people, "By photographing his subjects just after they were interviewed, he caught faces living the agony of survival; faces so haunted by painful memories that sorrow has become a permanent feature."

== Reception ==
The American Book Review described the photos as having "a powerful cumulative effect", one that emphasizes "the vulnerability and dignity of a class of people who are often stereotyped as mere servants of our nation's war machine." The University of Washington Press commented that dissent "within the military's own ranks is a powerful chapter in the history of war" and felt the book, "by examining it may help us better understand why the Vietnam War continues to haunt our nation." The On Guard reviewer says the book is "a spare but amazingly complete 'look' at the GI resistance movement, presented in a beautiful, dignified way." In 1992 the book was awarded First Place in the American Association of Museums annual Publications Design Competition. The touring exhibit of the photos and histories has also garnered positive reviews. A reviewer for The Boston Globe noted the "haunting atmosphere of the work" and said it was "almost palpable." The Boston Globe also selected the exhibit for its "Critic's Tip" and called it "remarkable". Z Magazine said, "The black-and-white portraits stare unflinchingly out at the viewer...the viewer is being interrogated by the power of the witnesses' gaze — the notorious thousand-mile stare."

== See also ==
- Concerned Officers Movement
- FTA Show - 1971 anti-Vietnam War road show for GIs
- F.T.A. - documentary film about the FTA Show
- Fort Hood Three
- GI's Against Fascism
- GI Coffeehouses
- Movement for a Democratic Military
- Opposition to United States involvement in the Vietnam War
- Sir! No Sir!, a documentary about the anti-war movement within the ranks of the United States Armed Forces
- Soldiers in Revolt: GI Resistance During the Vietnam War, book about soldier & sailor resistance during the Vietnam War
- Stop Our Ship (SOS) anti-Vietnam War movement in and around the U.S. Navy
- Vietnam Veterans Against the War
- Waging Peace in Vietnam
- Winter Soldier Investigation
