= Court-martial of Susan Schnall =

U.S. Navy nurse court-martialed for anti-Vietnam War activity

Susan Schnall
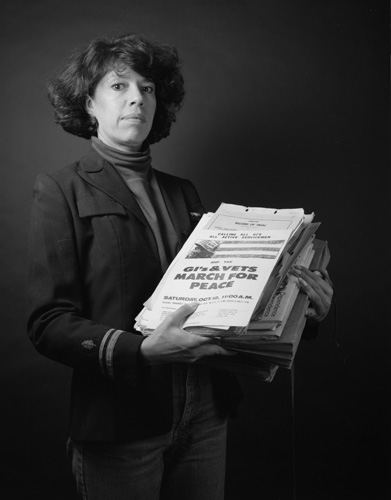
- Photo by William Short from A Matter of Conscience
- Born: Susan Marina LeVine; 1943 (age 82–83); Quantico, Virginia
- Occupations: U.S. Navy nurse, GI war resistor, activist
- Known for: “Bombing” antiwar leaflets on military installations, protesting Vietnam war in uniform

The court-martial of Susan Schnall, a lieutenant (junior grade) U.S. Navy nurse stationed at the Oakland Naval Hospital in Oakland, California, took place in early 1969 during the Vietnam War. Her political activities, which led to the military trial, may have garnered some of the most provocative news coverage during the early days of the U.S. antiwar movement against that war. In October 1968, the San Francisco Chronicle called her the “Peace Leaflet Bomber” for raining tens of thousands of antiwar leaflets from a small airplane over several San Francisco Bay Area military installations and the deck of an aircraft carrier. The day after this “bombing” run, she marched in her officer’s uniform at the front of a large antiwar demonstration, knowing it was against military regulations. While the Navy was court-martialing her for "conduct unbecoming an officer", she was publicly telling the press, "As far as I'm concerned, it's conduct unbecoming to officers to send men to die in Vietnam."

== Background ==
=== Enlistment and experiences ===
Susan Schnall (née Susan Marina LeVine) was born on March 9, 1943, in Quantico, Virginia, to Harold and Anne LeVine. Her father, a first lieutenant in the U.S. Marine Corps, was killed during the Battle of Guam in 1944 when she was 14 months old. She attended Stanford University’s five-year nursing program and signed up to be a Navy nurse when the military promised to pay her last two years of education. Even at that point she “was against all war, all violence” and explained this to the military recruiter. But she did want “to alleviate suffering by caring for wounded troops” and was convinced to proceed when the recruiter said nurses take care of all human beings, “whether they’re the enemy or not.” While at Stanford in 1967, she met and married Peter Schnall who was in medical school.

In the Navy she was assigned to the Oakland Naval Hospital where her work brought her face to face with the horrors of the war. “I can still remember the nighttime screams of pain and fear” she recalled years later. More, she felt the whole purpose of military medicine “is to take wounded guys out of the battlefield and put them back in again as quickly as possible.” This put her in a difficult position because the military is known for its strict discipline and harsh punishments for disobedience. But Schnall told Redbook magazine, which ran a long story on her in November 1969, that by the summer of 1968 she had “lost her fear of the military”. “It simply vanished — I don’t know why”. At that point she felt she had real freedom and she could take full responsibility for her actions.

=== Leaflet “bombing” ===
Leaflet for the GI's & Veterans March for Peace October 12, 1968

Schnall heard about an upcoming GI and Veterans March for Peace scheduled to take place in San Francisco on October 12, 1968, and decided to get involved. With other organizers, she put up demonstration posters around the hospital base, which she said “were quickly torn down” and base personnel were “forbidden to receive or circulate information”. She felt this was a violation of their constitutional right to circulate information about the march. She recalled seeing on the news that B-52 bombers were “dropping leaflets on the Vietnamese urging them to defect.” She thought, “if the United States can do that in Vietnam, then why can’t I do it here?”

Together with her husband; James Rondo, a Vietnam war veteran; and the pilot, William E. Gray, they loaded up a small plane with leaflets and “bombed” the military installations in the Bay Area with tens of thousands of flyers announcing the demonstration. This was one of only two instances when the anti-Vietnam war movement is known to have taken to the air. The other was during the efforts to stop the USS Constellation from sailing to Vietnam in 1971 when recently retired navy flight instructor Lieutenant John Huyler flew a CONSTELLATION STAY HOME FOR PEACE banner numerous times over the city of San Diego.

=== Marching in uniform ===
When Schnall reported for duty the evening before the planned demonstration she was handed a newly issued regulation, ALNAV 53, that explicitly prohibited members of the Navy from attending “partisan political” events in uniform. Violators would be punishable under the Uniform Code of Military Justice. This new regulation reflected growing concern within the military’s upper ranks that GI resistance to the war was becoming a problem, and they were particularly worried about GIs protesting in uniform.

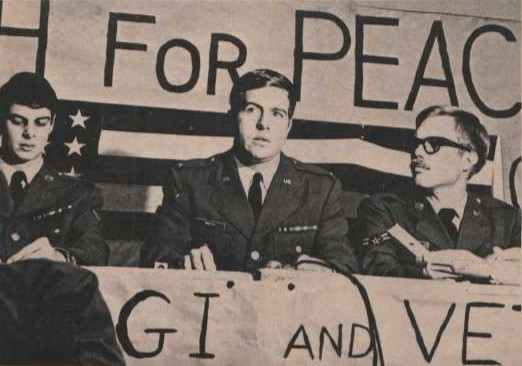
Michael Locks, John Bright, and Hugh Smith in their Air Force uniforms promoting antiwar march

A communication from The Pentagon had gone out in August as they learned that organizers for the GI and Veterans March for Peace were encouraging GIs “to come to the march either in uniform or out of uniform if they are afraid of reprisals.”. The message expressed alarm that there was no existing regulation “specifically proscribing” protesting the war in uniform. And it recommended the drafting of a new regulation “at once”. It also was quite clear about the military’s stance on the October 12 march — it should “be quashed if possible because of possible severe impact on military discipline throughout the services.” During the weeks prior to the march, GIs became bolder in their resistance. At a late September press conference, three active duty GIs, U.S. Air Force Airmen First Class Michael Locks and John Bright, and Second Lieutenant Hugh Smith appeared in their Air Force uniforms promoting the march. The Ally, a GI underground newspaper covering the press conference noted, “If they can openly organize and publicize this march, so can you. March with them....”

When Schnall received the new regulation, she wondered about its legality. As she explained later, “General Westmorland wore his uniform in front of Congress, asking for more money, armaments, and troops. Why couldn’t I wear my uniform and speak against the war?” She decided to keep her options open and when she left work on the morning of the protest she had her uniform on under a large coat with her Navy cap in a bag. She arrived at the march rendezvous point in San Francisco’s Golden Gate Park and found her husband and a group of corpsmen from the Naval hospital. She took off her coat and, as fellow demonstrators recognized the impact and significance of her uniform, she was encouraged to move to the front of the march. She found herself leading the protest with 700 other active duty GIs and reservists marching through San Francisco with up to 10,000 (some said 15,000) veterans and civilians. She marched arm-in-arm with retired Brigadier General Hugh B. Hester and Locks also in his uniform. After marching through town to the Civic Center, Schnall addressed the large crowd calling for an end to “this dirty, filthy war.” Locks also spoke, first reading from the regulation prohibiting him to be in uniform, and then saying “I can think of no greater cause to wear my uniform than for the cause of peace.”

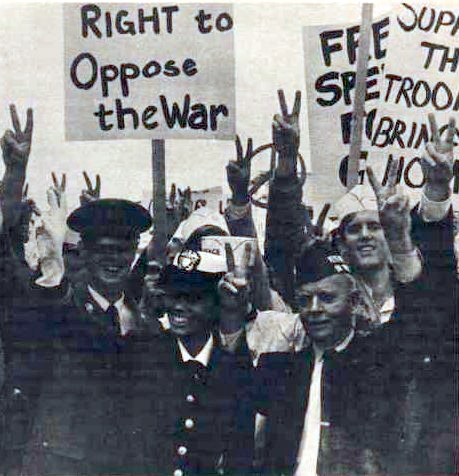
Airman Michael Locks, Lieutenant Susan Schnall and Brigadier General Hugh B. Hester

=== Growing GI resistance ===
The military had already witnessed increasing GI resistance to the war within their ranks. Prior resistance had been individual, like Army Captain Howard Levy's refusal to train Green Berets, or sporadic group actions like the Fort Hood Three, who collectively refused orders to combat, and the Fort Hood 43, who refused orders to deploy to the 1968 Democratic National Convention in Chicago for riot-control duties. The October demonstration in San Francisco contained a larger contingent of active duty GIs than ever before in an anti-Vietnam war demonstration, and several of them marched, spoke and gave press conferences in uniform. Then at the end of the march, a group of four AWOL soldiers turned themselves in to the military and were confined in the Army's military prison at the Presidio. The Army quickly regretted this when the four met with the other prisoners over the weekend, who were already angry over the horrible prison conditions and the recent guard murder of a fellow prisoner, and convinced them to participate in a protest over prisoner conditions and against the war. On October 14, 27 prisoners staged a sit-down protest which became known as the Presidio mutiny, one of the largest early instances of internal military resistance to the Vietnam War.

== Court-martial ==
=== Charges ===
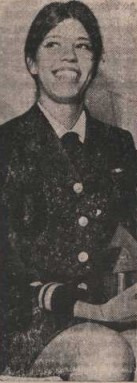
She is charged with leaflet bombing

Two days after the demonstration, both Schnall and Locks were charged with violating the Uniform Code of Military Justice (UCMJ) and were set to receive general courts-martial. On November 14, 1968, Schnall faced a formal hearing at the Treasure Island Naval Base where she was officially charged with disobeying a direct order not to wear her uniform and conduct unbecoming an officer. The San Francisco Chronicle ran a smiling photo of her with the caption “She is charged with leaflet bombing”. She was officially charged with marching in the GIs and Vets March for Peace in her uniform and dropping leaflets “with design to promote disloyalty and disaffection among members of the armed forces of the United States.” If convicted on both charges, she faced up to four years in military prison.

=== Verdict ===
At the court-martial in late January 1969, the military presented evidence of Schnall’s political activity, which no one disputed, while Schnall testified in her own defense arguing that the order barring her from participating in a “partisan political” demonstration was a violation of her right to free speech. She said she was an officer and a member of the military, and felt it was “proper and dignified” to wear the uniform while exercising her right to say she was against the war. The military court found her guilty after twenty minutes of deliberation and sentenced her to six months of hard labor, forfeiture of all pay and dismissal from the Navy. Locks, one of the principal organizers of the October 12 demonstration, was separately court-martialed and sentenced to a year at hard labor, forfeiture of all pay, reduction in rank to airman basic and a bad conduct discharge.

== Aftermath ==
=== Reaction ===
Schnall later told Redbook that she finally felt good about herself as Lieutenant Schnall. “It represented not what is going on in Vietnam, but my own stand for peace, for an end to all wars.” She described the march and speech she gave as “my coming out as a human being.” Due to an obscure Navy policy that any woman sentenced to less than a year in prison cannot be confined, Schnall served out her sentence as a nurse at the Oakland Naval Hospital. Ironically, the staff where she worked kept a scrapbook of news clippings about the Navy hospital and its staff which is now immortalized on the internet — Schnall’s clippings are carefully pasted into many of its pages.

=== Continued activism ===
While still working at the Navy hospital, Schnall continued to organize against the war, helping to create an antiwar GI coffeehouse and writing for local GI underground newspapers. Once out of the Navy, she moved to New York City where she worked in the intensive care unit at Lincoln Hospital in the South Bronx while also working with the Medical Committee for Human Rights and a group called Medical Aid for Indochina that raised money for medical supplies that went to North Vietnam and the National Liberation Front. For many years she was the executive administrator of Quality/Risk/Care Management, Regulatory Affairs, and Medical Records at a number of public hospitals in New York City, retiring from Bellevue Hospital Center in 2006. She was an Assistant Adjunct Professor, New York University, School of Professional Studies, Healthcare Management for over 20 years. After retiring from hospital work she traveled to Vietnam where she saw children who had been born with terrible deformities and birth defects caused by the U.S. chemical Agent Orange. She began working with an organization called Vietnam Agent Orange Relief and Responsibility Campaign and is now on their Board.

Schnall is currently the President of the Board of Directors of the Veterans for Peace organization. In August, 2016 she presented a paper on the Health Effects on American Service Members who served in Vietnam at an international conference on Agent Orange/dioxin in Hanoi. In April, 2015 she was awarded an Honorary Doctor of Humanities by Ohio Wesleyan University. When asked in a 2019 interview to reflect on her life she said she hoped she had been able to educate and inform people “that you can take a step against the reigning authority or the reigning government, and you can say, ‘I disagree with you, and I’m going to do something about it.’ That you not only will survive, but you’ll survive with your moral conscience intact.”

== See also ==
- Brian Willson
- Concerned Officers Movement
- Court-martial of Howard Levy
- Donald W. Duncan
- Fort Hood Three
- Presidio mutiny
