= Court-martial of Howard Levy =

U.S. Army Captain court-martialed for refusing to train soldiers for the Vietnam War

Howard B. Levy
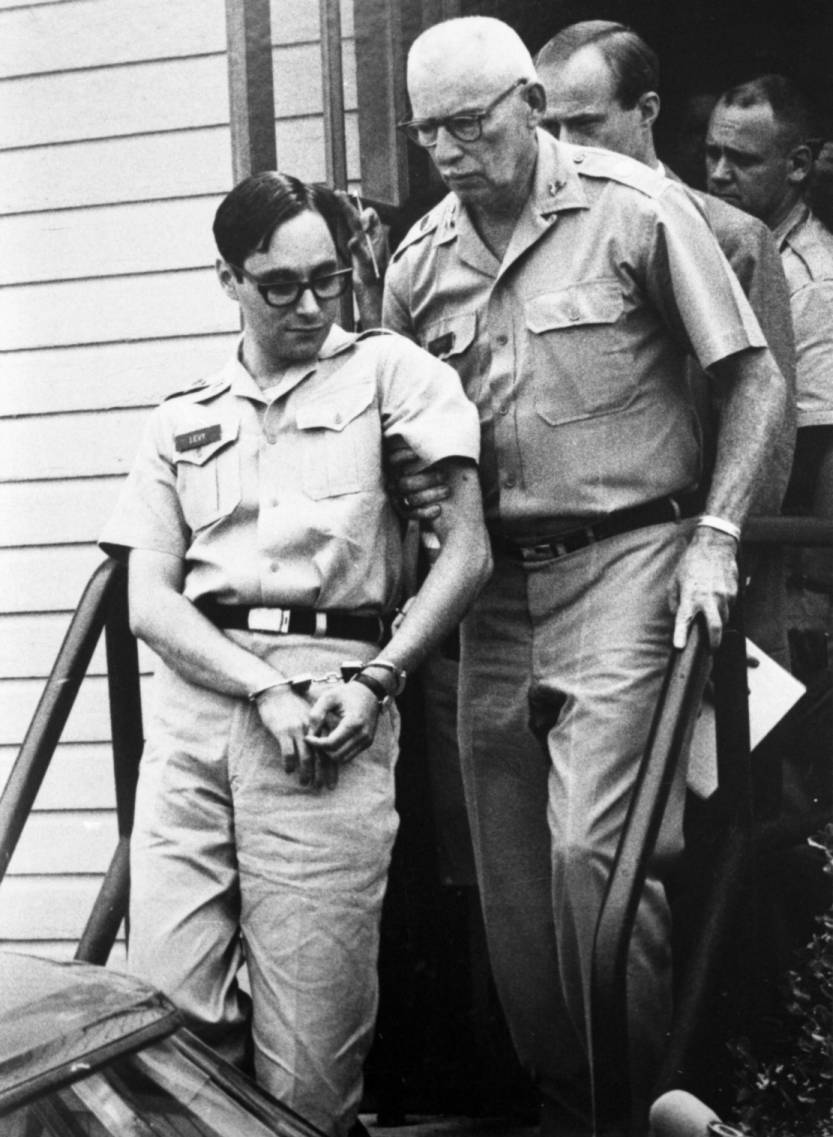
- Levy (left) is led from the courtroom after sentencing, June 3, 1967
- Born: Howard Brett Levy; April 10, 1937 (age 89); Brooklyn, New York, U.S.
- Education: Graduated from New York University in 1957, MD at SUNY Downstate College of Medicine (1961), interned at Maimonides Medical Center
- Occupations: Dermatologist; activist

The court-martial of Captain Howard Levy occurred in 1967. Howard Levy (born April 10, 1937) is a former United States Army doctor who became an early resister to the Vietnam War. In 1967, he was court-martialed at Fort Jackson, South Carolina, for refusing an order to train Green Beret medics on their way to Vietnam. He said it "became clear to me that the Army [was using medics] to 'win hearts and minds' in Vietnamese villages - while still burning them to the ground in search-and-destroy missions." He considered the Special Forces (Green Berets) "killers of peasants and murderers of women and children".

== Early life and education ==
Howard B. Levy grew up in Brooklyn, New York, the son of a salesman. He went to New Utrecht High School and then New York University. He got his medical training at the SUNY Downstate College of Medicine (1961) and interned at the Maimonides Medical Center. He was commissioned as a reserve officer in the Army Medical Corps in 1962, but was deferred until the end of his medical residency in July 1965, at which time he was sent directly to Fort Jackson.

== Court-martial, Nuremberg Defense and appeals ==
A noteworthy aspect of this case was that Levy's attorney, Charles Morgan Jr., raised the Nuremberg Defense, arguing that U.S. troops were committing war crimes in Vietnam and that American soldiers could lawfully refuse to obey orders related to Vietnam service. The Nuremberg trials of Nazi Leaders, which took place after World War II, held that soldiers involved in war crimes could be held liable even though under orders from a superior. A lesser known aspect of the case was that Levy "urged black enlisted men to refuse to serve in Vietnam because 'they are discriminated against and denied their freedom in the United States, and . . . discriminated against in Vietnam by being given all the hazardous duty and they are suffering the majority of casualties.'"

Levy's defense became national news and a cause célèbre among opponents of the Vietnam War because it was based on "both the illegality of the Vietnam War and the Nuremberg principle requiring non-participation in war crimes." The military court disagreed, sentencing Levy to three years at Fort Leavenworth for "conduct unbecoming an officer and a gentleman" and disloyal statements prejudicial to "good order and discipline." The court did, however, admit evidence of war crimes into testimony. The presiding law officer, Colonel Earl V Brown, surprisingly, allowed both the Nuremberg Defense and testimony in private session that Green Berets were engaged in war crimes in Vietnam. Despite this, because there was no testimony that Green Beret medics were involved in criminal activity or that their medical training was being used for such activity, the evidence was ruled irrelevant and, therefore, inadmissible in open court. Levy described this experience years later: "We tried to put the war on trial, but the military court said the truth is no defense."

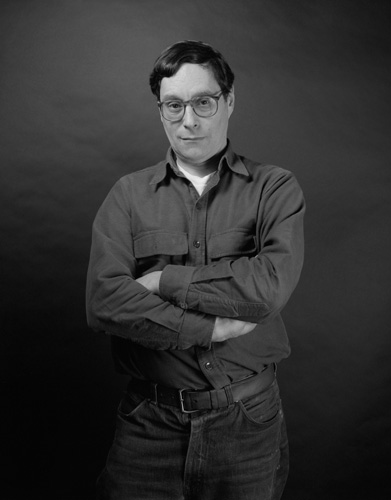
Portrait of Levy by William Short from A Matter of Conscience, 1992

Levy was released after serving more than two years in prison, but his case continued on through the courts. The first review by a Federal District Court affirmed his conviction. Then, in April 1973, The United States Court of Appeals for the Third Circuit reversed the decision on the grounds that the two key provisions of the Uniform Code of Military Justice that led to the conviction "were so vague as to be unconstitutional." The very next year, on June 19, 1974, in Parker v. Levy the Supreme Court reinstated Levy’s conviction with a controversial 5-3 decision. Parker v. Levy remains the legal foundation for recognition of "military necessity" as "a weightier interest than First Amendment rights of individuals in the military." Justice William O. Douglas dissented, arguing that “Uttering one’s belief is sacrosanct under the First Amendment.” After hearing about the verdict, Levy was quoted as saying: "I was unjustly court‐martialed, unjustly sentenced, ...unjustly spent two and a half years in prison, and I believe the Supreme Court ruling was unjust.”

== Book About Prison Life ==
In 1970, Levy published Going to Jail: The Political Prisoner, with fellow prisoner David Miller, about their experiences in prison. Miller had been imprisoned for 22 months for burning his draft card in protest to the draft and the war in Vietnam. According to Levy, prison taught him "that individuals acting alone cannot hope to transform a society." He emerged from his cell determined "to radically alter American society."

== Later career and personal reflections ==
In 2002, The New York Times interviewed him and found he had "no regrets" over his actions, and that he still considered the Vietnam War "criminal, senseless mayhem." For many years he had been the director of dermatology at New York City's Lincoln Medical and Mental Health Center in the Bronx. He was "still critical of America's use of military force, as in Afghanistan and possibly in Iraq." He also told the Times that "he felt an affinity with those Israeli army reservists who have said they would refuse to serve in the West Bank and Gaza Strip because of Israeli treatment of the Palestinians".

== See also ==
- A Matter of Conscience
- Concerned Officers Movement
- Court-martial of Susan Schnall
- Donald W. Duncan
- Fort Hood Three
- FTA Show - 1971 anti-Vietnam War road show for GIs
- F.T.A. - documentary film about the FTA Show
- GI's Against Fascism
- GI Coffeehouses
- GI Underground Press
- List of peace activists
- Movement for a Democratic Military
- Opposition to United States involvement in the Vietnam War
- Presidio mutiny
- Sir! No Sir!, a documentary about the anti-war movement within the ranks of the United States Armed Forces
- Stop Our Ship (SOS) anti-Vietnam War movement in and around the U.S. Navy
- Vietnam Veterans Against the War
- Waging Peace in Vietnam
- Winter Soldier Investigation
