= The Shelter Half =

The Shelter Half was a GI Coffeehouse that operated at 5437 South Tacoma Way, in Tacoma, Washington, United States, from 1968 to 1974. Named after a military tent called a Shelter-half, the coffeehouse's purpose was to provide a place for GIs at Fort Lewis military base in Washington State to resist the war in Vietnam. The Shelter Half served as an anti-war headquarters, publishing underground anti-war newspapers, organizing boycotts, connecting civilian activists with local GIs, and leading peace marches.

In November 1969, the Armed Forces Disciplinary Control Board prevented military personnel from attending the coffeehouse by placing it on a list of off-limits places.

The Shelter Half closed in the summer of 1974.

== See also ==
- Oleo Strut
- GI Coffeehouses
