= G.I. coffeehouses =

Antiwar coffeehouses near U.S. military bases during and after the Vietnam War

GI coffeehouses
- Part of the G.I. movement
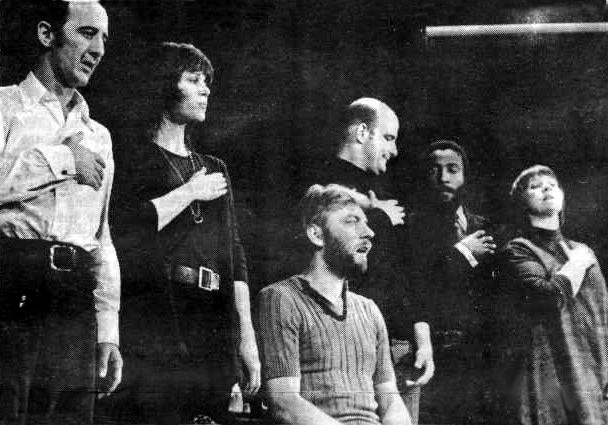
- FTA Show at a GI coffeehouse in 1971
- Date: 1968–1974
- Location: United States
- Goals: Assisting soldiers in resisting service in the Vietnam War
- Methods: Dialogue and organizing with soldiers

GI coffeehouses were coffeehouses set up as part of the anti-war movement during the Vietnam War era as a method of fostering antiwar and anti-military sentiment within the U.S. military. They were mainly organized by civilian antiwar activists, though many GIs participated in establishing them as well. They were created in numerous cities and towns near U.S. military bases throughout the U.S. as well as Germany and Japan. Due to the normal high turnover rate of GIs at military bases plus the military's response which often involved transfer, discharge and demotion, not to mention the hostility of the pro-military towns where many coffeehouses were located, most of them were short-lived, but a few survived for several years and "contributed to some of the GI movement's most significant actions". The first GI coffeehouse of the Vietnam era was set up in January 1968 and the last closed in 1974.

There were also several antiwar coffeehouses created during the U.S. led wars in Iraq and Afghanistan. In addition, while not called coffeehouses, there were at least two Labor Canteens created near the end of World War II which promoted racial integration and demobilization of the troops.

== The first GI coffeehouse ==
Cover page for The Short Times G.I. underground newspaper published in Columbia, South Carolina from 1969 to 1972 by GIs United Against the War in Vietnam

In the late 1960s, Fred Gardner, a Harvard graduate, editor at Scientific American, ex-Army reservist and antiwar activist, began studying and writing about the emerging GI antiwar movement. He noted increasing instances of insubordination, rebellion, and other forms of antiwar activity within the military. He also knew from his own military experience that the typical GI often felt isolated and unsupported, especially those who might see themselves as out of sync with military culture. He knew many GIs were looking for ways to check out the growing youth counterculture and became convinced that civilian antiwar activists could play a role in facilitating that, perhaps helping GIs to express budding antiwar sentiments. Gardner later wrote of that time: "By 1967 the Army was filling up with people who would rather be making love to the music of Jimi Hendrix than war to the lies of Lyndon Johnson."

=== The UFO opens ===
In late 1967 Gardner and Donna Mickelson moved to Columbia, South Carolina, near Fort Jackson. Fort Jackson was one of the U.S. Army's largest training posts and site of the trial of Captain Howard Levy, an army doctor, charged with "refusing to teach medicine to Green Berets and for 'conduct unbecoming an officer' in criticizing the Vietnam War". Gardner and Mickleson rented a space at 1732 Main Street in downtown Columbia turning it into a counterculture coffeehouse complete with photos of Bob Dylan and Janis Joplin along with many rock posters and alternative newspapers from around the country like the Berkeley Barb and The Village Voice. Named UFO, "a not-so-subtle caricature" of the pro-military U.S.O. that was right down the street, it opened its doors in January 1968. "The UFO was almost instantly popular, especially among Columbia's high school and college students. But there were also large numbers of soldiers from Fort Jackson visiting the UFO every week, some of whom were eager to organize political activity on post."

=== A pray-in ===
In mid-February 1968 "thirty-five uncertain but determined soldiers gathered [in uniform] in front of the main post chapel" for a pray-in to express "grave concern" about the war. The US armed forces prohibit political activity in uniform, but encourage uniformed attendance at religious services, so the GI were unsure how the military authorities would react. Most of the GIs were quickly disbursed by the Fort's MPs, who closed the post and surrounded the chapel, while two soldiers kneeling in prayer were "dragged away and placed in confinement". Eventually all official charges against organizers and participants were dropped but, in a soon to become familiar pattern, the military found other ways to discipline the soldiers: two were sent to Vietnam, one to Korea and others were demoted.

By August 1968, President Lyndon Johnson called a meeting with the Army's Chief of Staff, General William Westmoreland, "to discuss soldier dissent" and "demanding to know how many coffeehouses there were" and "what the Army was doing about it".

=== Fort Jackson Eight ===
In late 1968 a black soldier by the name of Joe Miles led the formation of a group called GIs United Against the War in Vietnam. They began publishing a newspaper called The Short Times, held regular meetings at the UFO and began distributing letters and petitions declaring their right to the protection of the First Amendment and to oppose the war. On March 20, 1969, they held a meeting outside a barracks on base that drew almost 200 soldiers, including several officers who, other than criticizing the dress and haircuts of some of the GIs, did not interfere with the meeting. The gathering eventually dispersed without incident but the next day the Fort Jackson command claimed the meeting was a "riot" and arrested nine members of GIs United. The group became the Fort Jackson Eight when one member was discovered to be an Army informer. Soon the case made national news, eventually becoming "a public relations and legal embarrassment for army officials". The New York Times noted, "By harassing, restricting and arresting on dubious charges the leaders of an interracial militant enlisted group there called GIs United Against the War in Vietnam, Fort Jackson's Brass has produced a cause celebre out of all proportion to the known facts." In April the GIs United group also sued the army "in an attempt to obtain the same right to protest that civilians have under the First Amendment". By June the army had dropped all charges against the eight.

=== Harassment and arrest ===
After the Fort Jackson Eight were released, the UFO experienced "a conspicuous increase in harassment by undercover FBI agents, local police, and civilians". The acting chief of staff at Fort Jackson later admitted that they "just called the police department, the chief, and he closed the coffeehouse... the fire department went in, and said, 'Ah! Fire hazard here, fire hazard there...'" Harassment of this nature continued to increase until January 13, 1970, when the local police chained the front doors of the UFO shut and arrested the staff members. At the resulting trial in April the coffeehouse was fined $10,000 (equivalent to $82,905 in 2025) and the staff members were sentenced to "six years each in prison for operating and maintaining a public nuisance". The UFO was unable to recover from this and never reopened, although The Short Times continued to publish until 1972.

General Westmoreland also ordered Army personnel to conduct "clandestine operations" to gather intelligence on GI coffeehouses near military installations.

== Coffeehouse movement of grows ==
Despite the difficulties at the UFO, the news of the early rapid development of GI antiwar activity at Fort Jackson spread quickly within the broader peace movement. In addition, the chapel pray-in and the seemingly incongruous scene of GIs hanging out in a psychedelic coffeehouse attracted media attention, soon becoming national news. All of this convinced peace movement leaders to support and help raise funds for additional GI coffeehouses.

=== The Oleo Strut ===
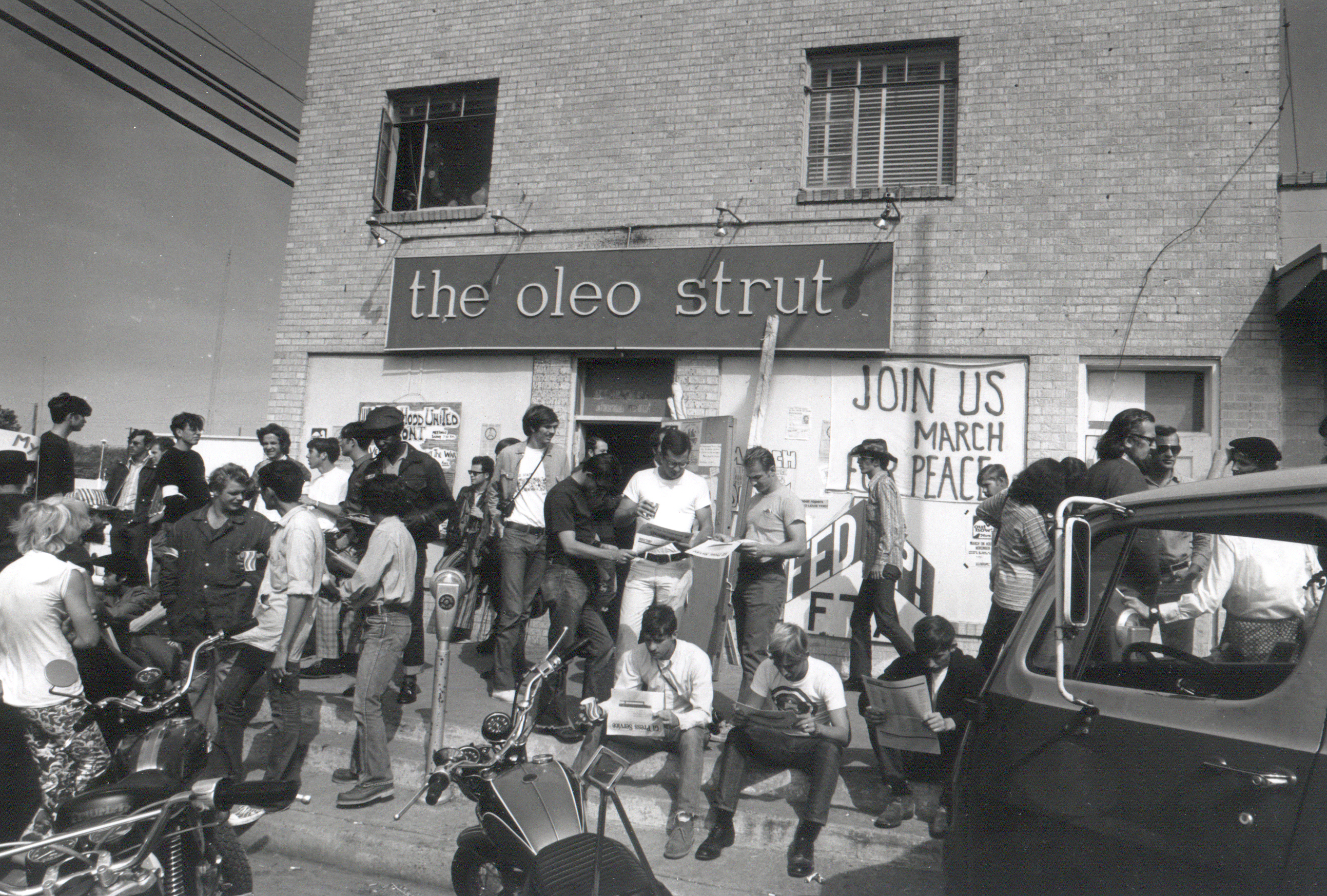
The Oleo Strut antiwar GI coffeehouse in 1971. Photo by Alan Pogue

The next major effort was directed at Fort Hood, which at the height of the Vietnam War housed more than 40,000 soldiers, 65% of whom had recently returned from thirteen-month stints in the war. As the army itself soon realized, these returnees with little time left in the military were the soldiers most likely to become involved in political activity against the war. In June 1968, Gardner and other activists rented an old shop at 101 Avenue D in Killeen, Texas, where Fort Hood was located. When Gardner left town to help set up other coffeehouses, Josh Gould and Janet "Jay" Lockard stepped in to become the principle operators of the soon to open Oleo Strut. The name was picked because an oleo strut is a shock absorber in the landing gear of many aircraft and the Strut's purpose was to help GIs land softly.

The Strut's grand opening, on July 5, 1968, was a counter-culture "love-in" at a local park that "included folk and rock performances, antiwar speeches, and copious amounts of marijuana". Among the 800 attendees were over 200 Fort Hood GIs. The Killeen establishment was not at all pleased, and by the end of the day, the local police broke up the party in riot gear. Soon, one of the Fort Hood soldiers, Private Bruce Peterson, founded an underground antiwar newspaper called Fatigue Press. With the help of the Strut's staff he would mimeograph hundreds of copies and then smuggle them onto the post for distribution. Peterson faced extreme retaliation from the military as he was set up on a charge of marijuana possession and sentenced to eight years of hard labor at Leavenworth, a questionable conviction overturned two years later on appeal. This did not stop the GI political activity, however, as Fatigue Press and more continued in his absence.

==== Soldiers refuse Democratic Convention orders ====
Logo for Fatigue Press, the G.I. underground newspaper at Fort Hood army base in Killeen, Texas from 1968 to 1972

Considerable controversy arose among the troops at Fort Hood as thousands of GIs were being prepared for possible use against civilian demonstrators expected at the August 1968 Democratic National Convention in Chicago. In an unprecedented act, a group of 60 black soldiers from the 1st Armored Division met on base to "discuss their opposition to Army racism and the use of troops against civilians". An all-night assembly ensued, including a visit from the base commanding general. Guy Smith, one of the soldiers attending, recalled that "a lot of black GIs knew what the thing [in Chicago] was going to be about and they weren't going to go and fight their own people". The meeting lasted all night and when 43 men remained in the morning they were arrested by the military police for refusal to follow orders. The Oleo Strut supported the arrested soldiers and helped with their legal defense.

==== Jane Fonda visits ====
Jane Fonda visited the Oleo Strut on May 11, 1970. In one of her first public antiwar actions, she took a stack of Fatigue Press underground newspapers and other leaflets and went onto Fort Hood at the East Gate. She began handing out the material to the stunned GIs who immediately recognized her, especially for her role in the 1968 campy sci-fi film Barbarella. She was quickly arrested by the military police and barred from the base, but told a press conference that afternoon that she did it "because GIs aren't allowed to distribute literature there, I think it's appalling that men who are sent overseas to fight and die for their country are denied the constitutional rights which they are supposed to be defending." Fonda returned to the Oleo Strut with actor Donald Sutherland on September 18, 1971, for several abbreviated versions of their then touring FTA Show (the anti-USO show), which had been denied any larger Killen venue by the increasingly hostile local establishment.

==== Armed Farces Day 1970 and 1971 ====
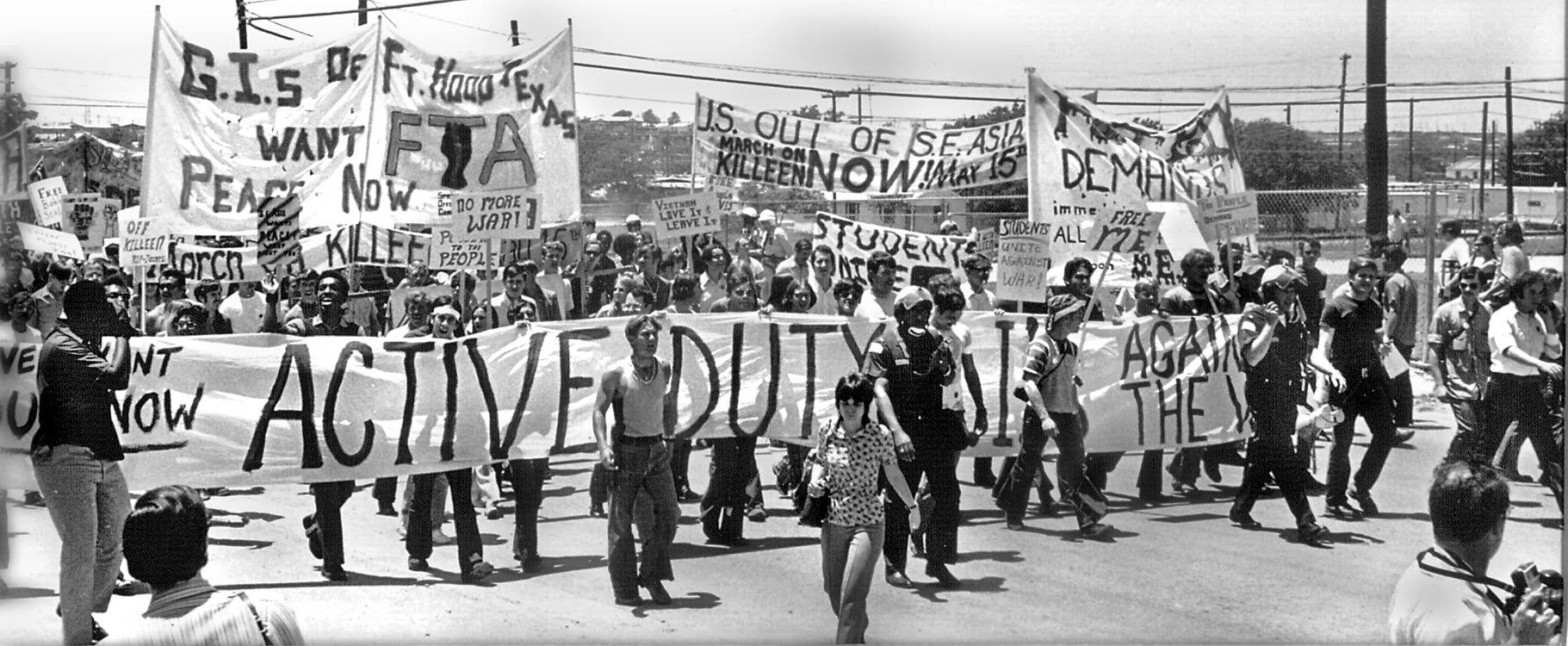
1971 Armed Farces Day antiwar demonstration at Fort Hood army base

Fonda's visit of May 11, 1970, gave an unexpected boost to the Fort Hood soldiers and their civilian supporters who were building for nationally coordinated antiwar demonstrations near military bases on May 16, Armed Forces Day. While Killeen's business community traditionally held patriotic and pro-military events in the town, antiwar activists felt it was important to express resistance in the wake of the recent escalated bombings in Cambodia and the shooting of protesting students at Kent State and Jackson State. Called Armed Farces Day, the antiwar activity "ended up being a much larger event than its organizers anticipated". "Several hundred GIs, many in uniform, assembled at the Oleo Strut" before marching to a nearby park where they were joined by hundreds of others. The GI underground newspaper claimed, in a likely exaggeration, that 1,000 GIs marched. But the stores in town, fearing a riot, closed their doors for the day and it seems true, as one activist claimed, that the whole town shut down.

In the wake of the 1970 Armed Farces Day, the Strut staff began to focus more on being a resource center for GIs, a "kind of living, vibrant, organizational source" staff member David Zeiger later recalled. They set up a counseling center that offered assistance with discharges and conscientious objector applications; education on GI rights and military law; and legal aid. The spring and summer of 1971 proved to be the Strut's busiest with GIs regularly meeting and making plans for actions. Reflecting this, the 1971 Armed Farces Day event was a big success involving as many as 700 GIs and civilians. After marching through town, the protesters gathered at a park to hear speeches and folk singer Pete Seeger.

==== Decline and closure ====
Over the next year the Oleo Strut's staff tried various strategies in their attempts to sustain the relevance of the coffeehouse to the Fort Hood GIs. They tried being more politically left wing, they opened a bookstore and closed the coffeehouse, becoming more a radical political center, and they brought in live entertainment like rock bands from the nearby popular music scene in Austin. Some of these strategies were more successful than others, but by 1972, as Richard Nixon's Vietnamization strategy pulled more and more U.S. army troops out of Vietnam, the Oleo Strut was attracting very few GIs. It closed its doors for good and stopped publishing the Fatigue Press in the summer of 1972.

=== The Shelter Half ===
The area around Seattle and Tacoma, Washington was profoundly impacted by the Vietnam War. In addition to the nearby Fort Lewis army base, there were McChord Air Force Base, Fort Lawton army base, Pier 91 Naval Station, Sand Point Naval Air Station, and the Puget Sound Naval Shipyard. Fort Lewis alone processed the induction of 2.3 million soldiers between 1966 and 1972, and became the army's central training ground for Vietnam combat, complete with a 15,000-acre mock Vietnam village containing thatched-roof structures, hidden tunnels, and play-acting "Viet Cong." As a result, the antiwar movement in the area also expanded in tandem with its growth throughout the U.S. In the fall of 1968, various antiwar, student and radical activists formed the GI-Civilian Alliance for Peace (GI-CAP), which, in conjunction with the military's concentration in the area, convinced Gardner and other national coffeehouse organizers that area would be an ideal location for another coffeehouse. The Shelter Half opened in Tacoma in late 1968.

Following the Oleo Strut's example of using a military term, it was named after a common piece of military equipment – the shelter-half. Really half a tent, soldiers each carry one shelter-half along with half the poles and other pieces, then when they camp, they pair off and erect a two-man tent. The name was meant to imply "strength through solidarity and cooperation", as well as "shelter" from the military environment. The Shelter Half announced its presence publicly with a free Christmas dinner which attracted about 20 GIs. Stan Anderson, a 22 "year-old army veteran who had been stationed at Fort Lewis, became the Shelter Half's first manager and unofficial spokesperson".

==== GIs lead Seattle antiwar demonstration ====
The Shelter Half and GI-CAP began working together and soon active-duty soldiers and local activists were using the coffeehouse to plan an antiwar demonstration for February 1969. On February 16, an estimated 300 GIs led around 1,000 demonstrators through downtown Seattle to a rally at Tacoma's Eagles Auditorium where they listened to speeches against the war and racism, and for GI rights. GI-CAP used Shelter Half's equipment to begin publishing an underground newspaper for GIs called Counterpoint, and this was just one of six different newspapers and countless leaflets, posters and pamphlets produced by different GI and civilian organizations through the coffeehouse over the next year. The newspapers, including the Lewis-McChord Free Press, Vietnam GI, and Fed Up!, were often smuggled onto bases and spread through GI networks far beyond the Tacoma area.

==== Soldiers arrested ====
On October 20, 1969, nearly 50 soldiers and several civilians, including Andy Stapp the founder of the American Servicemen's Union, met on Fort Lewis to discuss the idea of forming a GI union, similar to a labor union. Military police broke up the meeting and arrested 35 soldiers and three civilians, including Stapp, on the charge of "conducting an unauthorized meeting of a political nature on the post." All the soldiers were soon released and no formal charges were ever brought against them, but over the following months almost all of them were transferred, discharged, shipped to Vietnam, or busted on other charges. Seventeen of the GIs and three civilians, including Stapp, then sued the Secretary of Defense and the Fort Lewis commandant seeking to keep them "from prohibiting soldiers' meetings or disrupting them when they do occur."

==== Off limits ====
On December 11, 1969, the Shelter Half received an official letter announcing that the military was initiating action to place it "OFF LIMITS" for all military personnel. The letter, written by the president of the Armed Forces Disciplinary Control Board, Western Washington-Oregon Area, stated: "The board took this action after receiving information that the Shelter Half is a source of dissident counseling and literature and other activities inimical to the good morale, order and discipline within the Armed Services". According to the New York Times, this was "the first time that the military ha[d] moved to prevent soldiers from frequenting" GI coffeehouses. An official military hearing was scheduled for January 22, 1970.

==== The Trial of the Army ====
In response to the military's efforts to restrict GI access, the GI and civilian activists around the Shelter Half along with the broader antiwar movement in the local area became involved in efforts to defend the coffeehouse. At the University of Washington in Seattle a group of students organized what they called "the Trial of the Army", which on January 21 convened a panel of thirteen active-duty servicemen to listen to testimony about the Vietnam War and daily life in the military. Hundreds of civilians and GIs attended the mock-trial which heard from more than 50 local GIs as well as civilians. The "Trial" generated significant local and national publicity and probably contributed to the military's decision to cancel the hearing and abandon their efforts to declare the Shelter Half off limits.

==== Shift away from Army ====
As Vietnamization took hold within the U.S. Army, the other military branches became increasingly involved in the war. Because the Shelter Half was located in a region with both U.S. Navy and U.S. Air Force bases, the civilian organizers shifted their efforts away from Army troops and towards the others. They also shifted more towards counseling, providing information on how to file for and obtain conscientious objector status, legal advice, psychological counseling and even help obtaining health care.

==== Pacific Counseling Service ====
The best known counseling organization was the Pacific Counseling Service (PCS), which was created in 1969 by antiwar activists and lawyers to serve U.S. military bases along the West Coast and in the Pacific. Its first office was in Monterey California, near Fort Ord, and it eventually had projects in San Francisco, Oakland, Los Angeles, San Diego, Monterey, Tacoma, Tokyo, Okinawa, Iwakuni, the Philippines and Hong Kong. The Armed Forces Journal characterized PCS activity as "legal help and incitement to dissident GIs" and illustrated this by describing their practice of "airdrop[ing] planeloads of seditious literature into Oakland's sprawling Army Base". PCS literature described their efforts as dealing with the "problems being faced by GIs who were in trouble with the brass for their antiwar work". They provided counseling related to GI rights and conscientious objection, as well as offering "informational resources, facilitating publication of GI newspapers and pamphlets, planning project film-showings, speakers, study groups, and trips to further GIs' knowledge of Asian countries." In the spring of 1970, PCS began to work out of the Shelter Half and continued to do so for close to four more years.

==== Closure ====
The Shelter Half changed over the years. In addition to focusing more on counseling it became more of a local community organizing center. It hosted free dinners every Sunday and "fifty-cent lunches" for the low income residents of the area. After six years they closed down in the summer of 1974, lasting much longer than all the other GI coffeehouses of the Vietnam era.

== Other coffeehouses ==
=== Covered Wagon ===
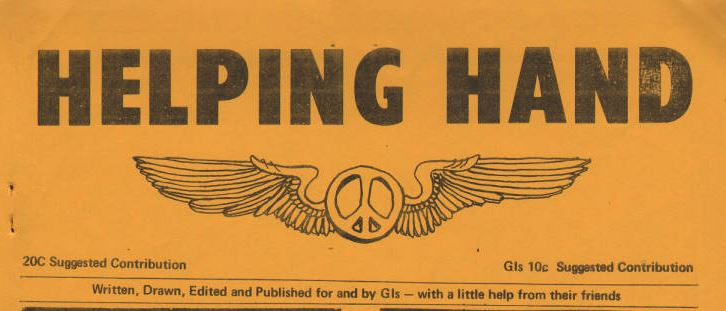
Masthead from Helping Hand G.I. underground newspaper at the Mountain Home Air Force Base published from 1971 to 1974

The Covered Wagon coffeehouse opened in early 1971 in a converted theater in Mountain Home, Idaho, near the Mountain Home Air Force Base. GIs from the base began publishing an underground newspaper called The Helping Hand. The rural Idaho town's pro-military establishment was hostile to the idea of GIs organizing against the war and waged a campaign against the coffeehouse. The local newspaper published letters urging physical attacks on the Wagon and its members and on November 21, 1971, the coffeehouse was burned to the ground by unknown arsonists. This attack generated national media coverage, including an appeal for support published in The New York Review of Books and signed by a number of prominent people, but the cause of the fire was never investigated by the town's authorities.

In 1972, Sergeant Mike Elliot had the lyrics to "Napalm Sticks to Kids" published as a poem in the first issue of the Helping Hand newsletter. The song had originally been composed by US Army and US Air Force soldiers assigned to 1/9th Cavalry while deployed to South Vietnam. Each soldier present wrote a verse about actions in which they participated, "express[ing] their collective bitterness toward the military that had turned them into murderers". They agreed they would not rest until it was published. Following his tour in Vietnam, Sergeant Elliot made good on that pledge while assigned to Mountain Home AFB. Following publication, the lyrics were reprinted in scores of GI newspapers all over the world. The words were again put to music and recorded by the Covered Wagon Musicians, an ensemble of active-duty military personnel, as the twelfth song in their album We Say No to Your War!, released by Paredon Records later in 1972. "Napalm Sticks to Kids" has circulated widely since it was popularized in 1972 and was used as a military cadence by all branches of the US Armed Forces until the late 1980s.

While the coffeehouse was open, it helped GIs organize demonstrations, pass out leaflets and put out the newspaper, and it hosted speeches by many well-known antiwar activists, including the FTA show, Howard Zinn, Dick Gregory and Country Joe McDonald. The Helping Hand ceased publication and the coffeehouse closed in late 1974.

=== Fort Dix Coffeehouse ===
The Fort Dix Coffeehouse opened in April 1969 in Wrightstown, New Jersey, the location of the Fort Dix army base, a major training location for troops heading to Vietnam. Fort Dix soldiers published a newspaper called The Time Has Come for a Long-Needed Shakedown out of the coffeehouse from 1969 to 1970. The coffeehouse played a major role in organizing support for a group of soldiers in the stockade at Fort Dix who rebelled over their living and working conditions. Over 300 soldiers were involved in the incident on June 5, 1969, and 38 of them, soon known as the Fort Dix 38, were accused of a variety of charges, including arson, rioting, and conspiracy to riot. Among other things the coffeehouse organized a demonstration at the gates of Fort Dix of over 4,000 people supporting the 38 soldiers. The coffeehouse experienced open hostility from the military and on February 8, 1970, "six men in military uniforms, including a captain and a sergeant first class, entered the coffeehouse and proceeded to 'harass the hell out of the GIs'". After being evicted by the coffeehouse staff they threatened "We will return." One week later, when the coffeehouse was filled with GIs and their dates for a Valentine's Day party, a grenade was rolled in through the front door. Two Fort Dix soldiers and one civilian were seriously injured. No one was ever arrested for the attack, and the coffeehouse's landlord, whose family and building were threatened, felt compelled to ask the coffeehouse staff to leave, forcing it to close after less than a year of activity.

=== Fort Knox Coffeehouse ===
In July 1968 four soldiers from the Fort Knox army post began producing and distributing an underground newspaper for GIs called Fun Travel Adventure ("FTA", an acronym usually meaning "Fuck the Army"). By the summer of 1969 they had been joined by other soldiers and civilians and decided to open a GI coffeehouse, which they did on August 30 in the town of Muldraugh, Kentucky. The day after opening it was raided by the local police, and the next day the city passed a law requiring new businesses to receive a "detailed police inspection". Within six days the city's attorney had convinced the building's landlord to revoke the coffeehouse's lease forcing it to close. The coffeehouse reopened within a month but its GIs and staff faced frequent arrests while leafleting or distributing newspapers and the coffeehouse itself was firebombed twice. In March 1970 a group of soldiers and civilians from the coffeehouse were attacked in town by men with bats and clubs. When the local police arrived the attackers fled and the police arrested three of the activists for disorderly conduct. By April 1970, with the coffeehouse under relentless pressure from local authorities and with several organizers in jail, it was forced to close. Antiwar GIs at Fort Knox continued to publish FTA until April 1973.

=== Green Machine ===
The Green Machine coffeehouse was established in Vista, California near the Camp Pendleton Marine Corps base in mid-1969. It was the site of the founding of the Movement for a Democratic Military (MDM) an influential antiwar and GI rights organization. MDM began as a merger of a small group of sailors in San Diego called GIs Against Fascism and a larger group of marines at Camp Pendleton. MDM and the coffeehouse helped to organize a December 14, 1969 demonstration in nearby Oceanside where an estimated 1,000 Black, White and Chicano GIs were among 4,000 who participated in an antiwar march and rally with speeches by Donald W. Duncan, Captain Howard Levy, Angela Davis and a number of active duty GIs. The Green Machine was frequently harassed by the local establishment and on April 29, 1970, it was shot up with 45 caliber machine gun fire, wounding one of the marines inside in the shoulder. A clandestine paramilitary right-wing group called the Secret Army Organization was suspected. A 2017 broadcast on KQED public radio interviewed two of the early organizers at the Green Machine, Teresa Cerda and Cliff Mansker a black ex-Marine. The interviewer observed that "The Green Machine and other coffeehouses at military bases were key in building the movement to end the war in Vietnam." Under constant legal and non-legal harassment, the coffeehouse closed in mid-1970.

=== Haymarket Square ===
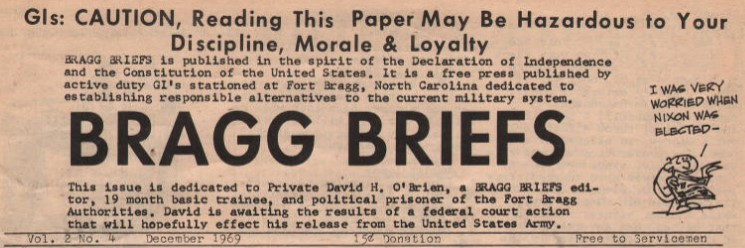
Masthead from Bragg Briefs GI Underground Newspaper December 1969

The Haymarket Square coffeehouse opened in August 1970, near Fort Fort Bragg in Fayetteville, North Carolina, remaining open until February 1972. Bragg was a key U.S. Army base during the Vietnam War. As early as 1966 it was sending division‐sized detachments to Southeast Asia and by 1968 it housed 57,840 soldiers, making it the largest military installation in the country. It's no surprise then that it became "one of the most active centers of the GI movement" and produced one of the longest lasting newspapers, Bragg Briefs. Much of the early GI antiwar activity at Fort Bragg was supported by and centered at the Quaker House in downtown Fayetteville, which was founded in May 1969 specifically to "help antiwar soldiers in Fayetteville." When in May 1970 the Quaker House was set on fire and forced to close, antiwar GIs regrouped and opened Haymarket Square in the heart of downtown Fayetteville before the end of the year. Arson investigators determined that two separate fires had been set under the Quaker House, "but no one was ever brought to justice" for the deliberate act.

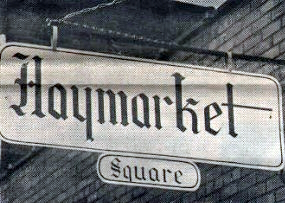
Haymarket Square GI Coffeehouse sign August 1970

At the grand opening of Haymarket Square, "[t]wo hundred G.I.s filled the building to capacity" to hear notorious antiwar Vietnam veterans Susan Schnall, ex-Navy nurse, and Donald Duncan, ex-Army Green Beret "blast the war and military hierarchy". GI's United was the main organization working out of the coffeehouse, but the location also supported and hosted a local chapter of Vietnam Veterans Against the War, whose ranks included veterans and many active duty soldiers from Bragg, and a chapter of the Concerned Officers Movement, which met "each Tuesday night at the Haymarket". The Haymarket was forced to close in February 1972 when the unsympathetic landlord "refused to renew the coffeehouse's lease". The local GI movement was able to shift its main base of operations back to the Quaker House, which had since reopened in a new location.

=== The DMZ ===
Started in Washington, D.C. in the early summer of 1970, the DMZ coffeehouse was named after the Demilitarized Zone in Vietnam and called itself "liberated territory", a real "demilitarized zone." A sign above the entrance said "ABANDON ALL RANK YE WHO ENTER HERE", which the Open Sights GI Underground Newspaper explained meant that "rank shall have no privilege, or power or prestige in the DMZ". The DMZ stayed open a little less than a year, closing in May 1971, but played a central role in the soldier and veteran resistance to the war in the D.C. area in the Spring of 1971. In addition to the Open Sights GI paper, the coffeehouse helped establish a "wide network of organizers" at local bases, including the editors of The Oppressed at Walter Reed Army Medical Center and Liberated Castles at Fort Belvoir. During the Spring antiwar activity, the DMZ was filled with GIs and veterans who, through their contacts in the nearby military units, were "able to provide an extremely accurate account of what military units were being mobilized" to counter the demonstrations.

=== Others ===
Other coffeehouses in the U.S., Germany and Japan included the Chicago Area Military Project (Chicago, Illinois), Echo Mike (Los Angeles, California), Fellowship of the Ring Coffeehouse (Fairbanks, Alaska), First Amendment Coffeehouse (Frankfurt, Germany), Fort Jackson GI Center (Columbia, South Carolina), FTA Project (Louisville, Kentucky), Hobbit Coffeehouse (Iwakuni, Japan), Homefront (Colorado Springs, Colorado), Left Flank (Milwaukee, Wisconsin), Liberated Barracks GI Project (Kailua, Hawaii), the Owl at Misawa Air Force Base (northern Japan), Pentagon GI Coffeehouse (Oakland, California), People's Place (Chicago, Illinois), the Potemkin Bookshop (Newport, Rhode Island) and the Red Herring at Chanute Air Force (Illinois).

== GI coffeehouses before and since the Vietnam War ==
=== Before ===
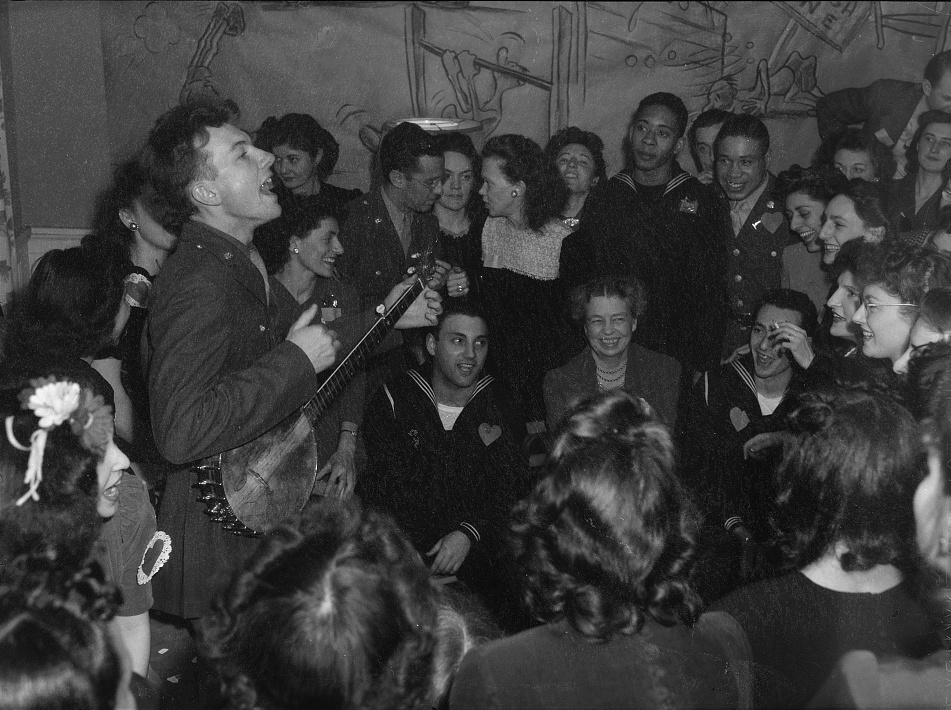
Pete Seeger entertaining Eleanor Roosevelt (center), honored guest at a racially integrated Valentine's Day party marking the opening of a Canteen of the United Federal Labor, CIO, in then-segregated Washington, D.C., 1944.

While not called coffeehouses, there were at least two Labor Canteens created near the end of World War II which promoted racial integration and demobilization of the troops.

The first one opened in Washington, DC on February 13, 1944, sponsored by the United Federal Workers of America, Congress of Industrial Organizations. Music for the grand opening was provided by folksinger Pete Seeger with First Lady Eleanor Roosevelt in attendance (see photo at right). The crowd was racially diverse, which was an extremely unusual sight in the segregated nation's capital at the time. The second Labor Canteen opened in Honolulu, Hawaii on Sunday August 19, 1945, sponsored by the International Longshore and Warehouse Union (ILWU). It was established as "a nonracist service canteen, because the USO and Red Cross would not allow Asians or African Americans into their canteens." The Canteen also became the site for demobilization meetings let by the Oahu Servicemen's Committee for Speedier Demobilization.

=== Since ===
During the U.S.-led wars in Afghanistan and Iraq, several GI coffeehouses were established near major military bases modeling themselves loosely on the tradition established during the Vietnam War. There was Under the Hood Café in Killeen, Texas; Coffee Strong in Lakewood, Washington, near Joint Base Lewis–McChord; and Norfolk Offbase in Norfolk, Virginia, near the Norfolk Naval Base, which is the largest naval base in the world. These coffeehouses saw themselves as providing antiwar information and alternative support for GIs, information they are not likely to find in traditional military support networks.

== See also ==
- Concerned Officers Movement
- Court-martial of Susan Schnall
- Donald W. Duncan, Master Sergeant U.S. Army Special Forces early register to the Vietnam War
- FTA Show - 1971 anti-Vietnam War road show for GIs
- F.T.A. - documentary film about the FTA Show
- Fort Hood Three
- GI's Against Fascism
- GI Underground Press
- Movement for a Democratic Military
- Opposition to United States involvement in the Vietnam War
- Presidio mutiny
- Sir! No Sir!, documentary about the anti-war movement within the ranks of the United States Armed Forces
- Stop Our Ship (SOS), anti-Vietnam War movement in and around the U.S. Navy
- The Spitting Image, 1998 book by Vietnam veteran and sociology professor Jerry Lembcke challenging the widely reported claim that American soldiers were spat upon and insulted by antiwar protesters
- United States Servicemen's Fund
- Vietnam Veterans Against the War
- Waging Peace in Vietnam
- Winter Soldier Investigation
