= Presidio mutiny =

Early instance of internal military resistance to the Vietnam War

- Part of the G.I. movement
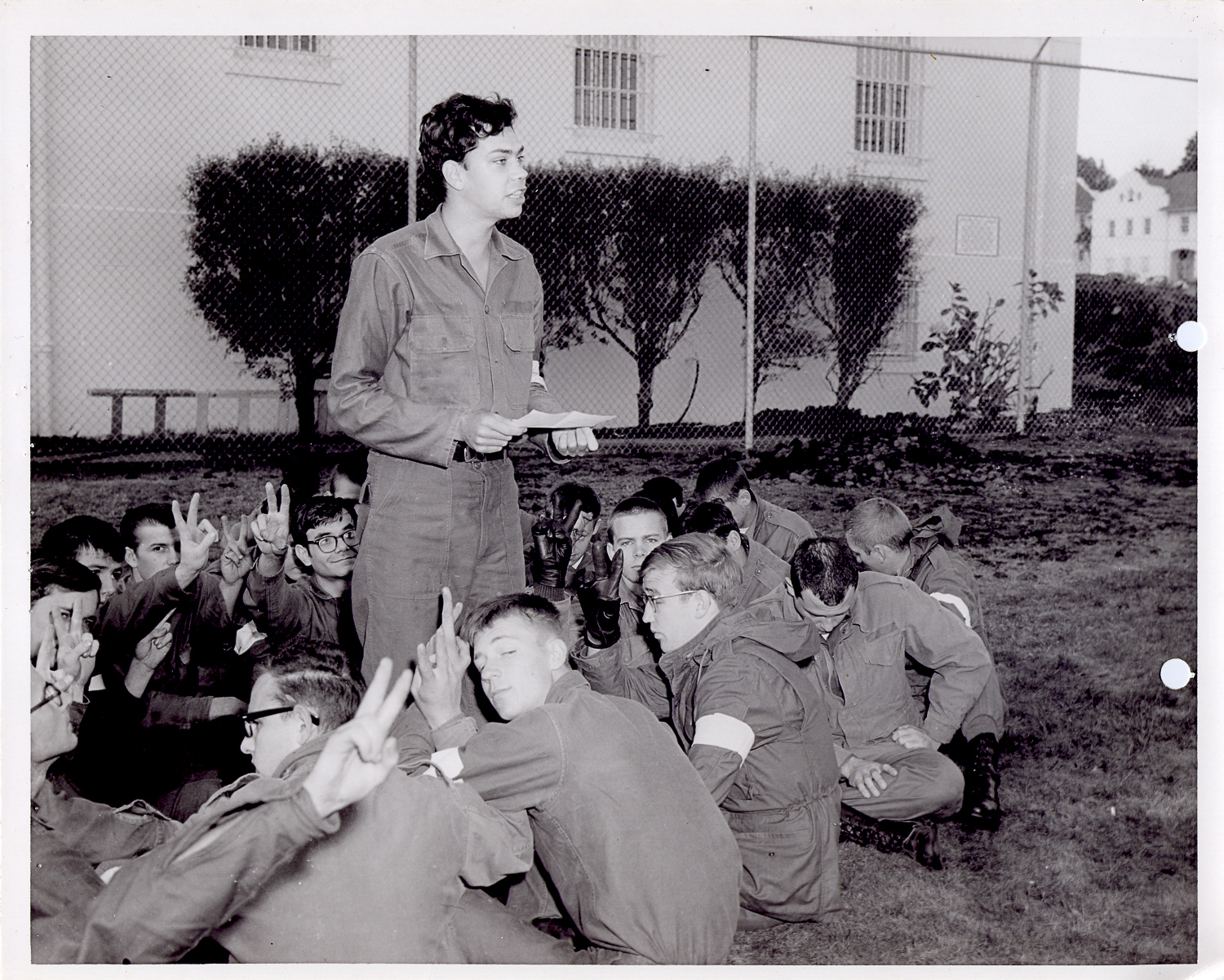
- The Presidio 27 sit-down protest on October 14, 1968. Private Walter Pawlowski is reading their demands.
- Date: October 14, 1968
- Location: Presidio of San Francisco
- Methods: Sit-in
- Result: Arrest of protesters

Lead figures
Keith Mather	Walter Pawlowski	Randy Rowland

The Presidio mutiny was a sit-down protest carried out by 27 prisoners at the Presidio stockade in San Francisco, California on October 14, 1968. It was one of the earliest instances of significant internal military resistance to the Vietnam War. The stiff sentences given out at courts martial for the participants (known as the Presidio 27) drew international attention to the extent of sentiment against the war within the U.S. military, and the mutiny became "[p]erhaps the single best known event of the domestic GI movement".

== Prelude ==
Several events and the overall conditions in the stockade set the stage for the protest. First, there was the death of Richard Bunch, a prisoner in the stockade, who was killed by a guard on October 11 with a shotgun blast to the back while walking away from a work detail. That evening there was a vocal protest inside the stockade against the killing; Keith Mather later called it "a miniature riot". On Sunday the 13th, prison officials held a memorial service and all the prisoners went "because he meant something to us." During the service the "chaplain stated it was justifiable homicide." This infuriated the prisoners who knew Bunch had been shot in the back and, according to one of the prisoners, "We started throwing chairs in every direction and yelling." Further heightening the tension, conditions in the stockade were overcrowded, with up to 140 prisoners housed in a space intended for 88, and there were charges of mistreatment by guards. One of the guards recalled later that the "place was extremely overcrowded...The conditions were atrocious."

The protest was set into motion, however, by a group of four AWOL soldiers who turned themselves in at the end of a large anti-war march in San Francisco on October 12 near where the Presidio is located. The military had made attempts to prevent service members from participating in the march, ordering up mandatory formations and special maneuvers which would keep men on base. Nevertheless, a large contingent of several hundred active duty and reserve servicemen marched at the front of the parade. The four AWOL soldiers (Linden Blake, Keith Mather, Walter Pawlowski, and Randy Rowland), having been put in the stockade, met with prisoners over the weekend and convinced them to participate in a protest over prisoner conditions and against the war.

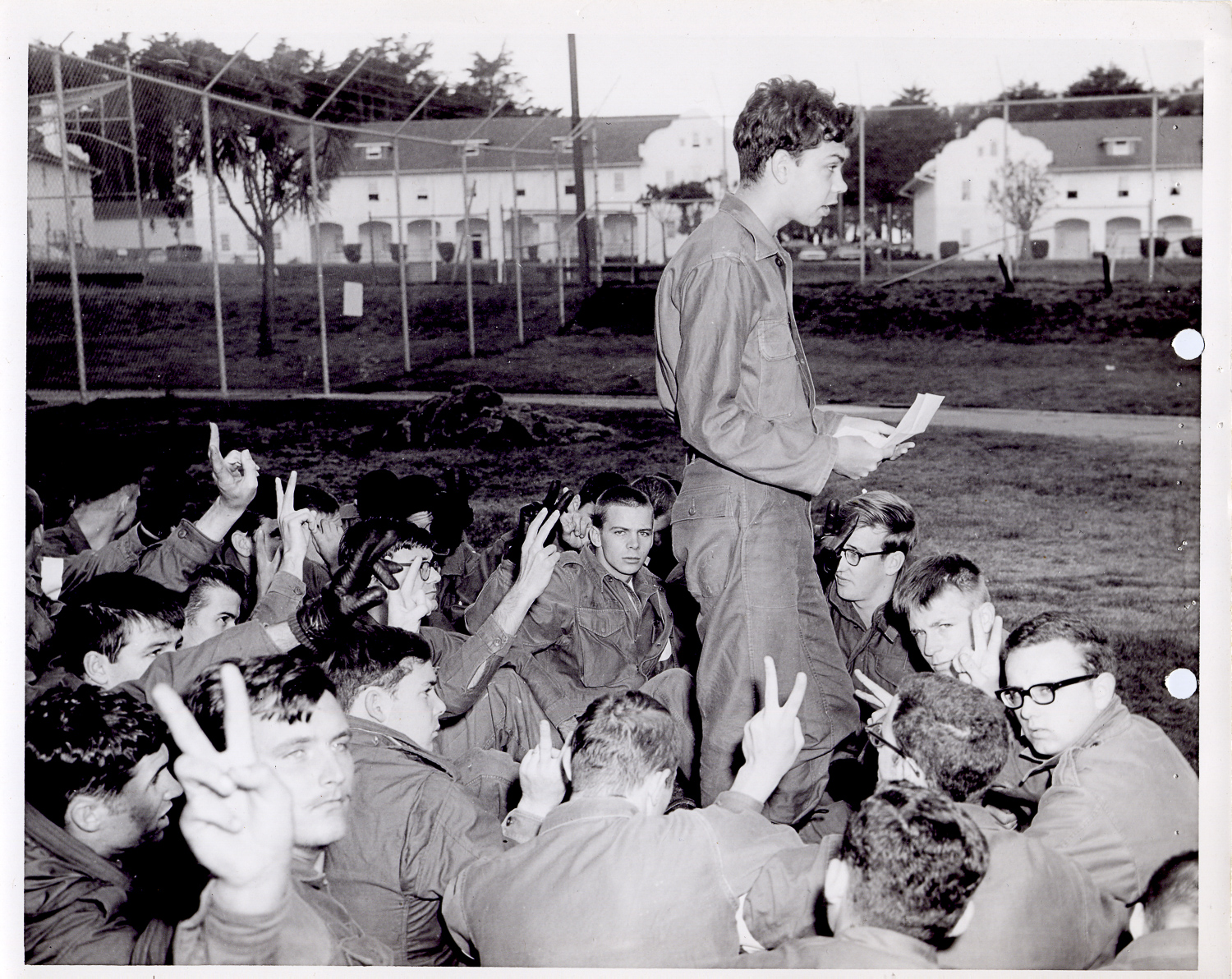
The Presidio 27 sit-down protest on October 14, 1968 with Private Walter Pawlowski standing and reading their demands just prior to arrest

== The protest ==
The protest was carried out during the morning formation on Monday the 14th. Twenty-eight prisoners broke ranks and sat in the grass, singing "We Shall Overcome". One of them returned to ranks when challenged, but the remainder continued to sing, with Pawlowski reading a list of demands. After the first orders to disperse were ignored, the camp commandant came and read the articles of mutiny. One of the protesters, Randy Rowland recalled later that fire trucks pulled up around them. He said, "We didn't know it at the time but later we found out they told the firemen to squirt us, and the firemen said no, we fight fires, we don't do this shit." Eventually the protest was broken up by military police in riot gear with "gas masks and their big sticks." They removed the protesters one at a time.

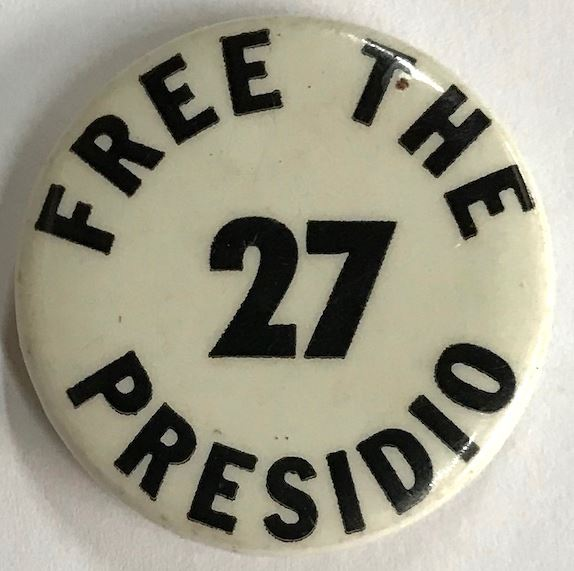
Button created by the supporters of the Presidio 27 soldiers who sat-down to protest their conditions and the Vietnam War in 1968

== The trials, escapes and appeals ==
The protesters were all charged with mutiny, one of the most serious and rarest military offense, which carries a potential death penalty. They were tried in small groups in the spring of 1969, with attorney Brendan Sullivan among the defense counsel. Before the trials, however, three of the prisoners escaped. On Christmas Eve in 1968, Mather and Pawlowski, "facing long jail terms for their leadership roles" and hoping to undermine the case against the other protesters by removing the "star defendants" from the trial, took advantage of the holiday distractions, jumped out a window and "jogged off the post". Two months later, Blake made a dramatic escape from a prison hospital, sawing through his window bars for two weeks at night with a smuggled hacksaw blade, and then squeezing naked through the hole. As the first defendants were sentenced to 15, 14, and 16 years at hard labor, national attention was focused on the severity of punishment for a non-violent protest. The charge of mutiny was particularly denounced, and even the officer in charge of the preliminary investigation recommended reduction of charges to "willful disobedience", but was overruled by Lt. Gen. Stanley R. Larsen, commander of the Sixth Army.

On appeal, the long sentences for mutiny were voided by the Court of Military Review in June 1970, and reduced to short sentences for willful disobedience of a superior officer. Rowland, for example, was released in 1970 after a year and a half imprisonment. The three escapees fled to Canada, with Mather remaining a fugitive until 1985. At the time of his release from the Army disciplinary barracks at Ft. Riley, Mather's lawyer Howard DeNike described his client as America's "last prisoner of conscience from the Vietnam War."

== Aftermath ==
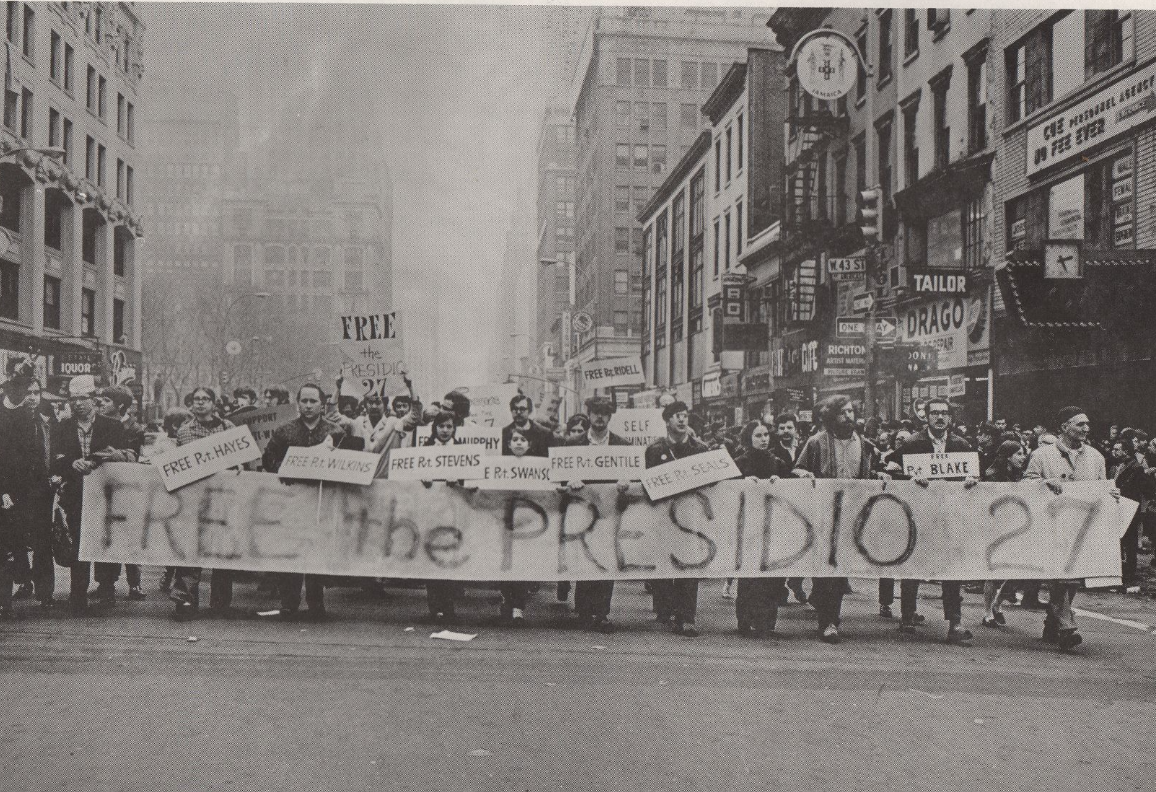
Free the Presidio 27 - April 5 1969 New York City Peach March

The Presidio mutiny was the first of a number of protests and riots that drew attention to anti-war dissent within the military. The Presidio 27 were supported broadly within the growing anti-Vietnam War movement. The case also brought press investigation of the conditions at the stockade and of the situations of the protesters. For example, it was determined that none of those convicted had been given the non-combatant assignment promised by recruiters. And it highlighted a serious drawback to the military general court martial, namely that the court's deciding members are "named - and then rated - by the man who sends the case to trial in the first place.". But even more significantly it raised the fundamental question of democracy within the military. Can, and should, rank-and-file soldiers debate and read about the war they are assigned to fight; and what if they disagree with their commanders? These same issues were working their way through the federal courts in the case of Captain Howard Levy, another early resister to the Vietnam War, eventually being decided by the Supreme Court in the controversial Parker v. Levy (1974).

The book The Unlawful Concert by Fred Gardner (Viking Press, 1970) reviews the affair in detail. The Line, a 1980 movie, depicted a fictionalized version of events. The episode is also examined in the 2005 documentary Sir! No Sir!, which examined the extensive military resistance to the Vietnam War.

== See also ==
- A Matter of Conscience
- Brian Willson
- Court-martial of Howard Levy
- Concerned Officers Movement
- Donald W. Duncan
- FTA Show - 1971 anti-Vietnam War road show for GIs
- F.T.A. - documentary film about the FTA Show
- Fort Hood Three
- GI's Against Fascism
- GI Coffeehouses
- GI Underground Press
- Intrepid Four
- Movement for a Democratic Military
- Opposition to United States involvement in the Vietnam War
- Sir! No Sir!, a documentary about the anti-war movement within the ranks of the United States Armed Forces
- Stop Our Ship (SOS) anti-Vietnam War movement in and around the U.S. Navy
- Veterans For Peace
- Vietnam Veterans Against the War
- Waging Peace in Vietnam
- Winter Soldier Investigation
