= Movement for a Democratic Military =

Anti-war and GI rights organization during the Vietnam War

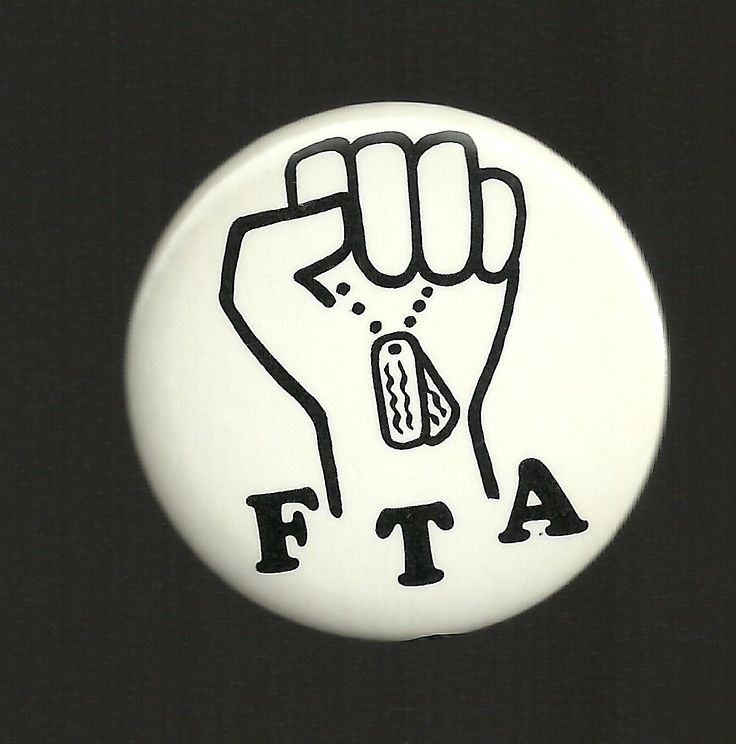
Logo of the Movement for a Democratic Military. "FTA" was slang for "Fuck The Army".

The Movement for a Democratic Military (MDM) was an American anti-war, anti-establishment, and military rights organization formed by United States Navy and Marine Corps personnel during the Vietnam War. Formed in California in late 1969 by sailors from Naval Station San Diego in San Diego and Marines from Camp Pendleton Marine Base in Oceanside, it rapidly spread to a number of other cities and bases in California and the Midwest, including the San Francisco Bay Area, Long Beach Naval Station, El Toro Marine Air Station, Fort Ord, Fort Carson, and the Great Lakes Naval Training Center.

Heavily influenced by the Black Panther Party and the Black militancy of the times, it became one of the more radical GI organizations of the era. MDM published a list of twelve demands for military reform and democratization, including collective bargaining for military personnel, the abolition of courts-martial, and a total military withdrawal from Vietnam, among other demands.

MDM was viewed as a "serious threat" by U.S. military officials and law enforcement, who took efforts to surveil the organization and punish their members. Their demands were criticized as unrealistic, with the potential of rendering the U.S. military "totally ineffective as a fighting force" if they were implemented. MDM became such a concern that they were investigated by the House Committee on Internal Security in 1971.

As with much of the GI movement during this era, chapters had a high turnover as members were transferred, discharged, and disciplined by the military. By late 1970 several chapters had splintered or disbanded, but the group's name and demands proved popular within the GI resistance movement overall. Some chapters continued through 1971 and 1972, with one chapter remaining until 1975.

== Founding ==
MDM started at the civilian-supported Green Machine anti-war coffeehouse in Vista, California, not far from Camp Pendleton. It began as a merger of a small group of sailors in San Diego called GI's Against Fascism and a larger group of Marines at Camp Pendleton. The San Diego group already had a newspaper called Duck Power and the Marines began by publishing a newspaper called Attitude Check whose first issue, dated November 1, 1969, announced that it was "written by marines and ex-marines for the benefit of the common snuffy, grunt, and em" ("snuffy", "grunt" and "em" were common slang names for enlisted Marines). The organization seemed to hit a nerve among local Marines and sailors and on December 14 in nearby Oceanside, an estimated 1,000 Black, White, and Chicano GIs were among 4,000 who participated in an anti-war march and rally with speeches by Donald W. Duncan, Captain Howard Levy, Angela Davis, and a number of active duty GIs.

== Preamble and 12 Demands ==
At their December 14, 1969 rally, MDM presented and explained the organization's Preamble and 12 Demands, which had also been published in the December 1, 1970 issues of Duck Power and Attitude Check. The Preamble stated "that ending the suppression of the American serviceman is an important part of a larger struggle for basic human rights" and pledged "support for the self-determination of all peoples."

The 12 demands were:

1. Collective bargaining for military personnel
2. "Human and constitutional rights" for military personnel
3. The end of censorship and intimidation within the military
4. The abolition of "mental and physical cruelty" in military prisons, correctional custodies, and basic training
5. The abolition of "court-martial and non-judicial punishment systems", with cases instead being reviewed by an elected civilian review board
6. The payment of wages equal to the federal minimum wage
7. The abolition of the "class structure of the military", including officer privileges and saluting, and the creation of an enlisted-elected review board of officer conduct
8. An end to "all racism everywhere"
9. The freeing of all political prisoners, including Eldridge Cleaver, Huey P. Newton, the Chicago Eight, in return for American prisoners of war in Vietnam
10. An end to "the glorification of war" in the military
11. The abolition of conscription
12. Immediate American withdrawal from Vietnam

The Preamble and 12 Demands ended, "We have been silent for a long time. We will be silent no longer."

== Spread ==
=== San Diego ===
The pre-existing group of sailors in San Diego called GI's Against Fascism merged with the group at Camp Pendleton near Vista and Oceanside. They all agreed to use the MDM name while publishing two newspapers, Duck Power in San Diego and Attitude Check at Pendleton. In mid-1970 the San Diego chapter changed the name of their newspaper to Dare to Struggle which they continued to publish until mid-1971. Attitude Check's last issue was in June 1970. The Camp Pendleton and San Diego areas were very pro-military and the MDM members located there experienced significant hostility and harassment. The San Diego area MDM had close ties with the San Diego Free Press which helped them put out their newspapers.

=== Great Lakes Naval Station ===
By early 1970, MDM had spread to several other cities and military bases. In January, a chapter formed at Naval Station Great Lakes, located north of Chicago, Illinois, the largest U.S. Navy training base and the only boot camp for naval enlistees. Aided by activists with the Wisconsin Draft Resistance and the Chicago Area Military Project, a counseling service and coffeehouse, this chapter was one of the most active and included a considerable number of black sailors. They began publishing The Navy Times Are Changing which continued until the end of 1972. On Armed Forces Day in May 1970 they sponsored a rally near the base which attracted 50 sailors and nearly 500 civilians. Another rally in September of that same year "drew a crowd of over five hundred sailors and civilians." When four Black WAVES were illegally arrested by base commanders in July 1970, more than 100 sailors marched to where the women were being held and surrounded the building, refusing to move until the women were released. Within weeks of this incident, over 900 enlisted men and women were discharged or transferred to other bases by the Navy. On Armed Forces Day in 1972, MDM and the Chicago Area Military Project organized a large demonstration with 400 GIs joining a crowd of over 2,000.

=== San Francisco Bay Area ===
Tom Csekey, one of the sailors who founded GI's Against Fascism in San Diego, traveled to San Francisco and helped form two chapters of MDM in the Bay Area. There was a short-lived chapter at Fort Ord near Monterey, California, which published the Right-On Post from May to August 1970. Another San Francisco Bay Area chapter with members from the Alameda Naval Air Station, Treasure Island, and other military bases, published their newspaper Up Against the Bulkhead regularly from 1970 to 1972 and then sporadically until 1975. The Up Against the Bulkhead paper and staff played an important role in helping sailors from the USS Coral Sea organize a November 6, 1971 anti-war demonstration in San Francisco involving over 300 men from the ship. This chapter was the longest lasting MDM organization and their newspaper was one of the more professional and widely distributed.

=== El Toro Marine Air Station ===
In July 1970 another chapter formed at El Toro Marine Air Station in Orange County, California. They published a newspaper called Pay Back consistently until the end of 1970 and then sporadically for another year.

=== Fort Carson ===
In mid-1970 a group of GIs from the Fort Carson Army base near Colorado Springs, Colorado, began to meet and publish a newspaper called Counter Attack. They were supported by the Homefront GI coffeehouse. As with all the other chapters, they experienced a high turnover rate and disbanded by mid-1971.

== Rules ==
MDM was more disciplined than most other GI resistance organizations of the period. At a June 1970 regional conference involving chapters from Camp Pendleton, San Diego, the Bay Area, Fort Ord, Long Beach, and El Toro, the members approved 16 strict rules. These included:

- No narcotics or marijuana
- No racism
- No male chauvinism or sexism
- No criminal activity or stealing from the people
- No putting personal pleasure before the interests and needs of the people.
- Mandatory participation in political education classes
- No misuse of funds
- Instructions that if arrested members were to give only their name, rank, and serial number

== Harassment, attacks, and police infiltration ==
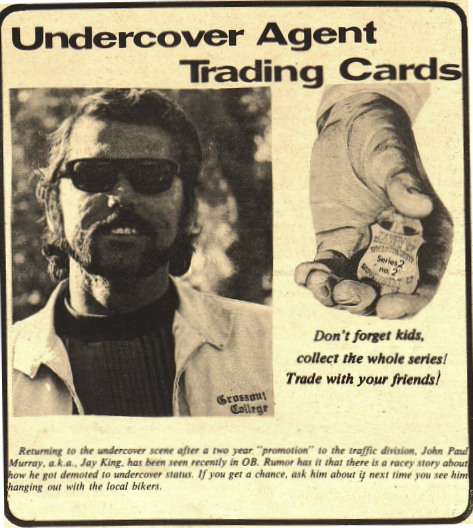
John Paul Murray Agent Trading Card from The San Diego Door, January 25, 1973

Several of the MDM chapters and their affiliated GI coffeehouses experienced legal and non-legal harassment from the pro-military towns where they were located and even violent attacks from right-wing organizations. In one instance, the Green Machine coffeehouse near Camp Pendleton was shot up on April 29, 1970, with .45 caliber gunfire, wounding one of the Marines inside in the shoulder. A clandestine paramilitary right-wing group called the Secret Army Organization was suspected. Another involved the San Diego Chapter on February 8, 1970. According to the lawyer and author Mark Lane, the San Diego Police Department and U.S. Navy shore patrol "smashed down the door of a San Diego store front ... to break up a peaceful meeting of Marines, Sailors and civilians." This was preceded by "several hours of terror on the streets in the vicinity by the local and military police during which civilians were threatened and detained by the cops and GI's were taken into custody, physically pushed around and finally arrested on non-existent charges."

The San Diego MDM chapter was reported to have been infiltrated by as many as four undercover police agents during 1970, including San Diego Police Department officers Randy Curtis and John Paul Murray. Murray achieved a considerable amount of local notoriety when he was exposed as an agent because he had become one of the leading members of San Diego MDM. He had gained a reputation for advocating more militant and sometimes illegal actions, including inciting violent confrontations with the police and supplying weapons to the Oceanside MDM chapter. He was even accused of attempting to talk some local activists into blowing up the San Diego–Coronado Bridge. Several female supporters of MDM accused the married Murray of lying to and sleeping with them. One member of the San Diego chapter of the anti-war group Concerned Officers Movement recalled Murray being so convincing as a committed anti-war activist that he ironically helped convince him to file as a conscientious objector. There were so many undercover agents infiltrating anti-war and activist organizations that from 1972 to 1973 the San Diego underground newspaper The Door published eleven undercover agent trading cards, each showing a different police agent. In 1978, the Los Angeles Times published a list of almost 200 organizations that had been under surveillance during the early 1970s by the Los Angeles Police Department, one of which was MDM.

== Controversy ==
The U.S. military viewed the MDM as a serious internal threat. Critics of MDM argued that their demands, if implemented, "would have rendered the U.S. military totally ineffective as a fighting force". In a January 1971 interview in the Marine Corps Gazette, Marine Commandant-General Leonard F. Chapman Jr. said MDM was "a serious threat to the defense of this country".

Other observers agreed that MDM was on the more radical end of the GI movement, but were more favorable. One scholar observed that MDM viewed "the war in a much broader context of military and social oppression that MDM hoped to eradicate. For many groups on the Left, ending the Vietnam War was a liberal issue in comparison to the more revolutionary goal of transforming American society. For members of the armed forces facing the prospect of combat in Southeast Asia, ending the war was a critical issue. The MDM demands, framed as they were in broad social and political terms, reflect a strong Left political influence on at least some of the GI antiwar groups." The Stanford Daily viewed MDM as a lifeline to the GIs: "These men have already suffered the dehumanization process of boot camp and many of them are being prepared for Viet Nam. They were living a nightmare of which there was little relief until MDM developed."

=== House Internal Security Committee investigation ===
The House Committee on Internal Security investigated MDM and the broader GI movement. They concluded that the GI movement "is the organized efforts by relatively small numbers of GIs and pseudo pacifist civilians to enlist and engage the participation by United States armed services personnel in the so-called peace movement." A witness before the committee described MDM's efforts at Fort Ord as follows:

The general purpose of the MDM was to recruit soldiers, to propagandize them, to encourage them to file for conscientious objector status, to hold demonstrations enlisting their sympathy against the Army and the establishment, to conduct ... certain operations aimed at distributing propaganda literature upon the military reservation illegally, and to disrupt in general and neutralize the effectiveness of Fort Ord as a military training base.

=== Radicalism ===
MDM itself was quite upfront with its radicalism. As the August 1970 Right-on Post newspaper published at Fort Ord put it:

The goal of MDM as an organization is to educate GIs to the real causes of their oppression, and to help them move to put an end to the problem. Through a black-brown-white coalition, we will educate one another, struggle together and defend one another. Rising as one, with clenched fists, we will break the man's chains. We are not afraid of the man's stockades; we've been there. The Vietnamese freedom fighters have shown us the way: a united force of brothers and sisters determined to free themselves can defeat the U.S. military monster.

== Legacy ==
MDM may have been the most radical of the GI anti-war and military resistance organizations of significant size during the Vietnam War. It has been estimated that they had between five thousand and ten thousand members and they had viable chapters in over half-a-dozen military bases and cities. Their stand against the Vietnam War, their call for self-determination of all peoples and their opposition to discrimination and racism proved popular with a segment of GI, particularly minority GIs, as was the idea of democratizing the military. With the transfer and discharge of many of its most active members, chapters were hard to sustain, and by the end of the Vietnam War, MDM's last remaining chapter dissolved.

== See also ==
- Concerned Officers Movement
- FTA Show - 1971 anti-Vietnam War road show for GIs
- F.T.A. - documentary film about the FTA Show
- GI's Against Fascism
- GI Coffeehouses
- GI Underground Press
- Opposition to United States involvement in the Vietnam War
- Presidio mutiny
- Sir! No Sir!, a documentary about the anti-war movement within the U.S. military
- Vietnam Veterans Against the War
