= Donald W. Duncan =

Early U.S. Army opponent of the Vietnam War

Donald Duncan
- Ramparts magazine cover from February 1966, featuring Duncan
- Born: Donald Walter Duncan; March 18, 1930; Toronto, Ontario, Canada
- Died: March 25, 2009 (aged 79); Madison, Indiana, U.S.
- Occupations: Activist; writer
- Known for: Anti-war activism
- Spouse: Included Apollonia Röesch (m. 1955, divorced)
- Children: 3 (known)
- Military career
- Allegiance: United States
- Branch: United States Army
- Service years: 1955–1965
- Rank: Master sergeant
- Unit: United States Army Special Forces
- Conflicts: Vietnam War

Master Sergeant Donald Walter Duncan (March 18, 1930 – March 25, 2009) was a U.S. Army Special Forces soldier who served during the Vietnam War, helping to establish the guerrilla infiltration force Project DELTA there. Following his return to the United States, Duncan became one of the earliest military opponents of the war and one of the antiwar movement's leading public figures. Duncan is best remembered as the cover image on the February 1966 issue of Ramparts where he announced "I quit!", as well as for his 1967 book The New Legions and his testimony to the 1967 Russell Tribunal, both of which detailed American war crimes in Vietnam.

== Early life ==
Donald Walter Duncan was born to Walter Cameron Duncan and Norma Duncan (née Brooker) in Toronto on March 18, 1930, later becoming a U.S. citizen. Duncan's father died when he was young, and his mother married Henry de Czanyi von Gerber, a naturalized American, cellist and orchestra conductor. Through the marriage Duncan gained a stepsister, Frances (later known as actress Mitzi Gaynor).

== Military career ==
Duncan, with his wife and daughter, moved to Rochester, NY in 1954. Subsequently, Duncan was drafted into the U.S. Army and first served as a non-commissioned officer in Germany in the field of operations and intelligence. Duncan married Apollonia Röesch in West Germany in 1955, after his previous marriage ended in divorce. They had two daughters and later divorced; The New York Times reported that Duncan married additional times, but their identities and whether he had more children is not known.

Duncan transferred to U.S. Army Special Forces (the "Green Berets") in the first part of 1961, where he continued to work in the field of operations and intelligence. During this interval Duncan received additional training in communications, weapons, and demolitions. Duncan served as an instructor at the United States Army Special Warfare School at Fort Bragg, North Carolina for a year and a half, teaching courses to Special Forces members on intelligence tactics and interrogation methods. He was told, "if the prisoner is not disposed to talk voluntarily, it is hardly the time or place to be concerned with the Geneva Conventions."

Duncan was deployed in Vietnam in March 1964, serving in a variety of capacities with the 5th Special Forces Group and Project DELTA, which he helped to organize. In addition to briefing and debriefing incoming and outgoing soldiers in the theater, Duncan directly participated in 8-member intelligence and "hunter-killer" teams.

As a result of his combat activity, Duncan was a recipient of two awards of the Bronze Star, the Air Medal, and the Vietnamese Cross of Gallantry with Silver Star. He was additionally recommended for the Silver Star and the Legion of Merit as well as a field promotion to captain, all of which he refused over time.

Duncan was also tapped to help write the official history of U.S. Special Forces in Vietnam, spending the last 6 or 8 weeks of his tour engaged in this task. He later recalled, "I had to pore over MACV (Military Assistance Command, Vietnam) intelligence reports almost daily.... I was absolutely astounded. It was bullshit. Pure fabrication. Routine fabrication.... From that day I grabbed and analyzed every report I could get my hands on having anything to do with intelligence and policy. It was obvious we had no policy and intelligence was whatever MACV said it was." He continued, "Instead of cleaning up corruption in the country, we became the biggest contributors to it. We supported the worst elements in the country. We had nothing to win. The whole thing was a lie."

He expanded on this in the Ramparts article mentioned above:

Little by little...I had to accept the fact that, Communist or not, the vast majority of the people were pro-Viet Cong and anti-Saigon. I had to accept also that the position, 'We are in Vietnam because we are in sympathy with the aspirations and desires of the Vietnamese people,' was a lie.

Disillusioned with the military situation of the war, Duncan declined the offer of promotion and ended his military career, returning to the United States.

He summed up his view of the war by saying,

In the long run, I don't think Vietnam will be better off under Ho's brand of communism. But it's not for me or my government to decide. That decision is for the Vietnamese.

== Journalistic career ==
Back home in the United States, Duncan and his wife moved to Berkeley, California. There he became active in the anti-war movement and became a writer for Ramparts magazine, one of the leading publications of the New Left in America.

In the February 1966 issue of Ramparts, Duncan published a fierce critique of American participation in the war, entitled "The Whole Thing was a Lie!" The magazine cover famously showed Duncan in his full Master Sergeant uniform announcing "I quit". The article explained his opposition to the war by providing details on the American connection to the corrupt government of South Vietnam as well as atrocities in the American conduct of the war effort, including training in the use of torture in interrogations and the use of Vietnamese proxies for the summary execution of prisoners.

He also praised the young people who were also protesting the war. He said "they should be commended" and wished it hadn't taken him 10 years in the Army to "figure it out." He insisted they were "not against our boys in Vietnam. On the contrary. What they are against is our boys being in Vietnam."

In 1967 Random House published a book written by Duncan entitled The New Legions which was sharply critical of the American military campaign in Vietnam while exposing many details about the Green Berets.

Duncan also presented testimony on American war crimes in Vietnam to the Russell Tribunal in Roskilde, Denmark in November 1967, where he was one of the first three former American soldiers to testify. There he detailed a de facto class in torture techniques conducted for members of the Special Forces entitled "Counter-Measures to Hostile Interrogation."

In 1971 Duncan delivered the closing statement to the Winter Soldier Investigation conducted by Vietnam Veterans Against the War.

== Later life and death ==
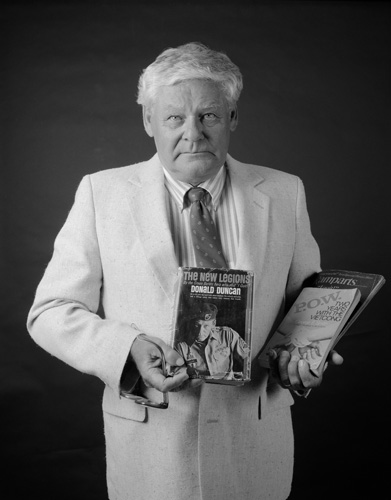
Donald Duncan photo by William Short from A Matter of Conscience

Duncan settled in Indiana around 1980. In 1990, he founded a nonprofit group that provided services for the poor. He died at a nursing home in Madison, Indiana on March 25, 2009, aged 79. The only contemporary report of his death was an obituary in The Madison Courier, which did not mention his military career or his activism. His death was not reported in connection with his anti-war activism until 2016, when The New York Times published an obituary. Editor William McDonald explained that the death became known to the newspaper during research on what was planned to be Duncan's advance obituary, written by Robert D. McFadden. Regarding the decision to complete and publish the article seven years after the subject's death, McDonald said:

If another news organization, particularly one with national reach, had run an obituary in 2009, we would have stood down, acknowledging that we had been napping back then and that it was way too late now to make up for the lapse. A competitive daily newspaper isn’t keen on reporting something that happened seven years ago. Unless, of course, virtually no one else had reported it [...] The thinking was, we would have written about Mr. Duncan immediately after he died had we known, so we should apply the same standard now.

== Works ==
- The New Legions. New York: Random House, 1967.
- "The Whole Thing Was A Lie!" by Donald Duncan Originally published in Ramparts, February 1966. Vietnam Full Disclosure

== See also ==
- A Matter of Conscience
- Concerned Officers Movement
- Court-martial of Howard Levy
- Dennis Stout, another US soldier who reported war crimes early in the Vietnam War
- FTA Show, a 1971 anti-Vietnam War road show for GIs
- F.T.A., a documentary film about the FTA Show
- Fort Hood Three
- GI's Against Fascism
- GI Coffeehouses
- GI Underground Press
- Movement for a Democratic Military
- Opposition to United States involvement in the Vietnam War
- Presidio mutiny
- Sir! No Sir!, a documentary about the anti-war movement within the ranks of the United States Armed Forces
- Stop Our Ship (SOS) anti-Vietnam War movement in and around the U.S. Navy
- Vietnam Veterans Against the War
- Waging Peace in Vietnam
- Winter Soldier Investigation
