= Waging Peace in Vietnam =

2019 book edited by Ron Carver, David Cortright and Barbara Doherty

Waging Peace In Vietnam: U.S. Soldiers and Veterans Who Opposed the War
- Cover of the first edition
- Editors: Ron Carver, David Cortright and Barbara Doherty
- Language: English
- Subject: History, Opposition to United States involvement in the Vietnam War, Anti-war, Vietnam War
- Published: September 2019 (New Village Press) (distributed by New York University Press)
- Publication place: United States
- Media type: Print (hardcover and paperback)
- Pages: 320 pages, 8.50 x 11.00 in, 200 black and white illustrations (1st edition, hardcover)
- ISBN: 978-1-61332-107-2 (1st edition, hardcover)
- Website: https://wagingpeaceinvietnam.com
- Includes oral histories and photographs by Willa Seidenberg and William Short from A Matter of Conscience

Waging Peace in Vietnam: U.S. Soldiers and Veterans Who Opposed the War is a non-fiction book edited by Ron Carver, David Cortright, and Barbara Doherty. It was published in September 2019 by New Village Press and is distributed by New York University Press. In March 2023 a Vietnamese language edition of the book (Vietnamese: Tranh đấu cho hòa bình) was launched at the War Remnants Museum in Ho Chi Minh City, Vietnam.

The book documents the movement by U.S. GIs and veterans in opposition to the Vietnam War, and asserts that this resistance has "become an almost secret history." Through essays, oral histories, photographs, documents, poems, and pages of the GI underground press, the book refutes what it calls the "post-Vietnam myth" of antiwar protesters spitting on returning Vietnam GIs, and instead shows GIs to have been an integral part of the antiwar movement.

In an introductory essay, David Cortright, Director of Policy Studies at the Kroc Institute for International Peace Studies at the University of Notre Dame, counters the claim that the U.S. military could have won the Vietnam War had it not been undermined by politicians and the media, and he writes: "The dissent and defiance of troops played a decisive role in limiting the U.S. ability to continue the war." He adds: "It is arguable that by 1970 U.S. ground troops in Vietnam had ceased to function as an effective fighting force." The book presents evidence for this conclusion.

== Synopsis ==
The book covers the GI and veteran resistance to the Vietnam War from the very early stages of the war until the signing of the Paris Peace Accords in 1973. It has essays and contributions from members of every branch of the U.S. military, from enlisted and officer, from women and men, from those of many skin colors and walks of life, from the famous and the unknown, from highly decorated combat troops and deserters, from front line grunts and jet pilots. It includes chapters on the behind the scenes civilian supporters and on the next generation of resisters to the Iraq and Afghanistan Wars.

The book was inspired by and draws content from the Waging Peace In Vietnam exhibit which opened in the Spring of 2018 at the University of Notre Dame's Kroc Institute for International Peace Studies, in South Bend, Indiana and at the War Remnants Museum in Ho Chi Minh City, in Vietnam. The exhibit and the book draw from many sources including oral histories and photos from the book A Matter of Conscience by Willa Seidenberg and William Short, the GI Press Collection archive at the Wisconsin Historical Society, and the U.S. National Archives. They document that thousands of soldiers, sailors and pilots refused to fight, sail and fly bombing missions in Vietnam, having a profound effect on the antiwar movement, and on the war itself. The exhibit is currently touring the United States.

=== Early resisters ===
The first chapter on early resisters tells of some of the first GIs to publicly oppose the war and lets some of them tell their own stories. One essay was written by Donald W. Duncan, a highly decorated Master Sergeant in the U.S. Army Special Forces ("Green Berets") who resigned in September 1965 just a little over a year after the Gulf of Tonkin incident which led the U.S. to engage more directly in the war. Duncan, a specialist in unconventional warfare, came to recognize through his experiences in battle against Viet Cong guerrillas that they had "the support of the people" - in fact, he said, they had "an overwhelming mandate". In February 1966, Duncan appeared on the cover of Ramparts Magazine in uniform saying "The whole thing was a lie!" and "I Quit!" It mentions the Fort Hood Three, Private First Class James Johnson, Private David Samas, and Private Dennis Mora, who in 1966 became the first three soldiers to publicly refuse to go to Vietnam. They were arrested and their case became a rallying cry for a small but growing antiwar movement. And it has an essay by Howard Levy, an Army Captain and physician assigned to train Green Berets in dermatology treatments until it became clear to him that "the Army was developing ploys like this to 'win hearts and minds' in Vietnamese villages - while still burning them to the ground in search-and-destroy missions." In May 1967 he was court-martialed and spent twenty-six months in prison for refusing to carry out his assignment.

=== The GI press ===
Chapter 2 documents the history of the GI underground press. An introductory essay explains how these papers "were filled with critical news about the war, cartoons that lampooned the military leadership, updates about soldier protest, and information on where GIs could find legal help." They "criticized racism in the military and U.S. society, and analyzed the racist and imperialist nature of the Vietnam War." A recurring feature of many were contests for "Pig of the Month" or "Lifer of the Month". While conceding the actual number of GI antiwar newspapers can never be known it argues "credible estimates range from 144 to nearly 300." Many of them carried irreverent titles mocking war and the military, including A Four Year Bummer, Kill for Peace and Fun Travel Adventure (FTA) which most GIs understood to mean "Fuck the Army". It documents how the troops who created and circulated these newspapers took serious risks. Army Sergeant Skip Delano, who was stationed at Fort McClellan, Alabama after returning from Vietnam, writes about hiding from the Military Police (MP) in the trunk of a car to avoid six months in the stockade for distributing their paper Left Face. Army soldier Terry Irvin recounts how after they "tried and tried" to get approval to distribute their underground GI newspaper, the Lewis-McCord Free Press on the Fort Lewis and McChord Air Bases in Washington, they decided to circulate the U.S. Declaration of Independence on the Fourth of July. They were surrounded by MPs, arrested and "charged with distributing unauthorized literature on base." Irvin describes being up for general court-martial and facing three years in Leavenworth until the press got wind of what happened. The charges were quickly dropped. These newspapers often received letters from GIs. One of these is reproduced telling of a soldier organized antiwar parade on Memorial Day at Long Binh Army Base in Vietnam; the result was eight Article 15s (a military administrative hearing) for disturbing the peace. The soldier ended his story saying, "Can You Dig That? We had a parade in Vietnam and got busted for disturbing the peace. What can I say — FTA." A black veteran writes about the impact of Muhammad Ali's "No Vietcong ever called me nigger", and says he realized he was "living this contradiction of being a black soldier in the land of another man of color and terrorizing him." He started writing to turn from the violence of the war.

=== GI coffeehouses ===
This chapter explores the history of GI Coffeehouses, which were small cafes and political centers created mainly by civilian antiwar activists near military bases as a method of supporting antiwar and anti-military sentiment among GIs. The first one was established in January 1968 outside Fort Jackson in Columbia, South Carolina and the last closed in 1974. Fort Jackson was one of the Army's central training centers for soldiers heading to Vietnam and the UFO coffeehouse there is described as "an instant hit" by David Parsons in an introductory essay. Parsons, the author of a book on the GI Coffeehouse movement, goes on to say the UFO was "[d]ecorated with rock-and-roll posters" and "quickly became a popular gathering spot for local GIs — and a target of significant hostility from military officials, city authorities, and outraged citizens". Hostility was visited on all these centers, many of which were in pro-military towns adjacent to military bases. "Without exception," the introduction continues, "every GI coffeehouse in the network was subjected to attacks from a variety of sources — investigated by the FBI and congressional committees, infiltrated by law enforcement, harassed by military authorities, and, in a number of startling cases, violently terrorized by local vigilantes." Several civilian organizers tell their stories here including Jane Fonda who describes being smuggled into Fort Carson by active duty servicemen in the trunk of a car. Overall, a picture is painted of a GI coffeehouse network that "played a central role in some of the GI movement's most significant actions".

=== Petitioning and marching ===
The next two chapters include essays, photos and stories about many of the protest methods used by antiwar GIs. There was the November 9, 1969 full page ad in The New York Times calling for a large mobilization against the war on November 15, 1969, in Washington, DC. It was signed by 1,365 active-duty military personnel, including 142 from Fort Bliss in El Paso, Texas a generally pro-war town where there was a particularly active chapter of GIs for Peace. A copy of this petition made its way to the troops in Vietnam and Dave Blalock writes about its impact on his Army unit where they decided to wear black armbands on the 15th. He says, "we're all wearing black armbands. It was like 100 percent of the enlisted men, everybody's wearing a black armband, including some of the war doctors and the helicopter pilots." In 1970 the Reservists Committee to Stop the War collected "more than 2,200 signatures of Reservists and National Guardsmen" on a petition calling for the immediate U.S. withdrawal from the war. And on October 9, 1971, when six men from the Army's Firebase Pace in Vietnam refused to go out on patrol and were threatened with court-martial, "[s]ixty-five out of one hundred men in B Company signed a petition in a show of solidarity."

Navy Nurse Susan Schnall tells of her creative method for distributing antiwar material: "A pilot friend and I rented a single-engine plane, filled it with thousands of leaflets, and dropped them over Bay Area military bases: Treasure Island, Yerba Buena Island, Oak Knoll, the Presidio, and the deck of the USS Ranger at Alameda Naval Air Station." They were organizing for a GI and Veterans March for Peace on October 12, 1968, and when the day arrived she marched in her uniform along with five hundred other active duty military personnel (a two-page photo captures this event). David Cline was a combat infantryman in Vietnam who was wounded twice and awarded Purple Hearts and a Bronze Star. He writes about being wounded and finding a book in the hospital called The New Legions where Donald Duncan (see above) talked about his experience in Vietnam and why he resigned from the military. Cline felt Duncan was basically saying "we're fighting on the wrong side" and said "it made a lot of sense to me because that's what I saw." Cline went on to join the GI movement, smuggle underground newspapers onto Fort Hood, become a national coordinator of Vietnam Veterans Against the War and president of Veterans For Peace. Several photos highlight actions by Vietnam Veterans Against the War. In the fall of 1970 "they marched through New Jersey in a mock 'search-and-destroy' exercise called Operation RAW (Rapid American Withdrawal) to show Americans the terror inflicted on civilians in Vietnam by U.S. troops." And on April 23, 1971 "[e]ight hundred U.S. veterans individually tossed their medals and ribbons onto the steps of the [U.S.] Capitol [in Washington, DC] to denounce the war and proclaim their shame at having been decorated for serving in a war they believed was unjust."

=== Exposing war crimes ===
Chapter 6 opens with an essay by Michael Uhl who led a combat intelligence team in Vietnam as a First Lieutenant with the 11th Infantry Brigade. He argues that My Lai, the mass murder of unarmed South Vietnamese civilians by U.S. troops, was just the tip of the iceberg; "Many returning veterans were intimately aware from their own combat tours that U.S. forces were routinely committing atrocities, aimed mostly at civilians." He describes the National Veterans Inquiry and the Winter Soldier Investigation, which both occurred in 1970 and gave a platform to dozens of veterans who testified to America's atrocities in the war, "from unprovoked mass murder, to the poisoning of Vietnam's crops and forests with tons of chemical herbicide, to the widespread use of torture during interrogations." Paul Cox, a Marine squad leader, writes of witnessing the murder of several women, children and an old man and declares it "turned me into an antiwar activist." Ron Haeberle, an Army photographer, describes taking photographs of the My Lai Massacre and the difficulties he had in getting them made public, while Ron Ridenhour, a helicopter gunner in Vietnam, describes his role in exposing the massacre. Ridenhour gathered eyewitness accounts from other soldiers, and after being ignored by 30 members of Congress and Pentagon officials, took his story to Seymour Hersh who won a Pulitzer Prize for his reporting on My Lai. Additional contributions are from Dennis Stout who tried to report fourteen war crimes and received personal threats against his life, and from John Kerry, the 68th U.S. Secretary of State, who represented Vietnam Veterans Against the War testifying against the war before the U.S. Senate in 1971.

=== Other forms of resistance ===
The forms of protest against the war were as varied as the individuals involved. One extremely common form was unauthorized absence, including desertion. Citing congressional testimony, an essay by Ron Carver one of the book's editors, argues that by 1971 "desertion and AWOL rates had reached the highest levels in modern U.S. history." He cites research that estimated "absenteeism deprived the military of about one million man-years of service" He also points out that as ground troops became increasingly unreliable in Vietnam, the U.S. turned to an air war but soon found "desertion rates explod[ing] in the Navy and Air Force."(p. 87) Essays from draft resisters and deserters discuss why they made their decisions and how they feel about it now.

Other more militant methods have been little discussed prior to this. Editor David Cortright argues African Americans "were among the most defiant troops in fighting against racism and the war and posed a significant challenge to the military's mostly white power structure." All of the military branches experienced major racial rebellions whose roots "lay in patterns of racial discrimination, growing militancy among African American troops, and a general crisis of morale". In August 1968, a prison rebellion erupted at Long Binh Jail at Bien Hoa, northeast of Saigon "in which hundreds of prisoners fought with military police". In the summer of 1969, fighting over an incident of racial discrimination at Camp Lejeune in North Carolina "left fourteen Marines injured and one dead". A Marine internal investigation revealed that "many white officers and NCOs retain prejudices and deliberately practice them." At Travis Air Force Base in northern California in May 1971, the perceived unjust arrest of several black airmen led "more than two hundred enlisted members, including some whites, marched in several groups to free the arrested troops." When they were met by more than three hundred military police backed by civilian police from neighboring communities, more than "six hundred airmen were drawn into the resulting brawl. An officers' club was burned to the ground and dozens of troops were injured. One hundred and thirty-five service members were arrested, most of them black; ten people were injured, and a civilian firefighter died." In late 1972, the Navy experienced its most serious racial uprising aboard the USS Kitty Hawk and the "first mass mutiny in the history of the U.S. Navy" on the USS Constellation. Cortright argues "The resistance of African American members of the military against racism and war was a major factor in the collapse of discipline, morale, and combat effectiveness during the Vietnam War." Essays from black veterans of rebellions and resistance discuss their growing awareness of the connection between racism and the war. Keith Mather, writes about his role in the October 1968 Presidio mutiny at the Presidio stockade in San Francisco, California which was sparked when a prisoner was murdered by a military guard and grew into 27 prisoners sitting down in protest against conditions in the stockade and against the war.

Another little discussed aspect of the war is fragging, the deliberate killing or attempted killing by a soldier of a fellow soldier, usually a superior officer or non-commissioned officer (NCO), which Cortright calls the "most horrific indication of the breakdown of the armed forces". He says exact numbers of fraggings are not known but recent studies estimate "600 to 850 or possibly more." He states, "The threat of fragging became a pervasive presence that loomed over many units in Vietnam and fundamentally altered the relationship between commanders and their troops." A witness to one of these fraggings writes, "I asked, 'What's going on?' This fellow answered, 'They have fragged the "lifer hooch" as a warning because they were getting too gung ho.'"

=== Redefining patriotism ===
Chapter 10 contains essays from a POWs, the son of a POW, GI and civilian resisters, and an Army Major who helped end the My Lai Massacre. They each describe how and/or why they (or their father) turned against the war. Bob Chenoweth was a helicopter pilot shot down in Vietnam and captured by the Viet Cong. In the "Hanoi Hilton" POW camp he "learned about Vietnam's history, culture, and people." He saw films of "the Winter Soldier Investigation held in the U.S. by Vietnam Veterans Against the War" and recognized that "GI activists and veterans" were providing "an undeniable voice about what was being done in our name." He spoke out against the war and said of his captors, "These are people from whom I learned a new way of looking at the world, who protected me and sent me home a better person than when I left." Tom Wilber writes about his POW father Gene, a "religious, conservative, right-leaning, career military officer", who came to realize the war was wrong. While in captivity he made statements against the war and defended them upon his return home. He "announced publicly that the statements he made while in captivity were voluntary" and insisted that during his entire "time in prison, he "received shelter, clothing, hygiene, and medical care", "never went a day without food", and "was not tortured." Carl Dix, a black Army enlisted man from Baltimore, describes showing up at Fort Bragg only to see a large sign outside the base, "WELCOME TO KKK COUNTRY". He discusses how this and other things impacted his "developing black consciousness." He read Malcolm X and followed news of the Black Panther Party and heard about the December 1969 murders of Fred Hampton and Mark Clark by the Chicago police. Then he found out about the police attack on the Los Angeles Black Panther headquarters "where tanks and mortars were set up in the streets of L.A." He writes, "This war isn't just something over there, it's here, too, and I have to decide what side I'm on. I decided I couldn't be a part of the war in Vietnam; I couldn't go fight for America." He and five other soldiers at Fort Lewis refused to go to the war and became the "Fort Lewis Six". Dix spent eighteen months in Leavenworth military prison. John Tuma, was assigned to an Army intelligence unit and soon realized he was expected to participate in and supervise the torture of prisoners for information. After refusing he was threatened with court-martial and barely survived two attempts on his life. Hugh Thompson was an Army helicopter pilot in Vietnam and took heroic action to stop a number of killings at My Lai by threatening and blocking U.S. soldiers and preventing them from murdering unarmed civilians. He evacuated a number of civilians by air and reported the atrocities by radio several times. He writes, "I set my aircraft down between the civilians and the GIs, and I told my crew, 'Y'all cover me. If these bastards open up on me or these people, you open up on them.' They said, 'Yes, sir, we're with you.'"

=== Navy and air force resisters ===
This chapter contains essays covering the resistance within the U.S. Navy and Air Force. The lead essay, written by ex-Navy fighter pilot John Kent, is about the Stop Our Ship (SOS) movement which mobilized thousands of sailors and civilians to stop, disrupt and frustrate the U.S. Navy's ability to conduct the war. The war is described as "a bully's war, a war of domination and conquest, an imperial war." Examples are given of sailors refusing to sail, taking sanctuary in churches and marching in demonstrations; antiwar petitions and underground newspapers onboard Navy ships, civilians attempting to blockade ships, sailors jumping overboard to join blockading civilians, and crew members forming the letters SOS on a flight deck. An ex-Navy flight instructor flew multiple times over San Diego dragging a banner encouraging sailors aboard the USS Constellation to stay home. Pictures of underground newspapers and flyers are shown with headlines like "Military Revolting" and "A Warship Can Be Stopped." Naval sabotage also increased in tandem with the SOS movement. "The Navy reported seventy-four instances of sabotage during 1972, most on aircraft carriers."

In the Air Force, resistance among airmen increased as the military shifted more and more to the air war. One well known resister was Captain Michael Heck an American B-52 pilot who refused to continue flying bombing missions over North Vietnamese targets in late 1972. He explained, "I'm just a tiny cog in a big wheel.... but a man has to answer to himself first." An Air Force staff sergeant wrote to his Senator, "The obviously insane slaughter of innocent people is not at all conducive to restful nights. The flight crews are simply 'fed up' with the 'useless killing.' Aborted takeoffs are becoming increasingly common." Charlie Clements, a graduate of the Air Force Academy who flew more than 50 missions in Vietnam, was flying his C-130 on "a secret mission to Cambodia, and I remember looking out of the plane and seeing vast areas that looked like the moon. Only one thing did that: B-52s. I realized we were conducting massive bombing operations there." He decided the war was immoral and refused to fly. The Air Force responded by committing him to a psychiatric hospital.

=== The next generation resists ===
Chapter 12 contains essays from and about veterans and GIs of the Iraq and Afghanistan Wars who followed in the footsteps of their Vietnam War forebears. Editor David Cortright describes the antiwar movement against the Iraq and Afghanistan Wars as "smaller than the Vietnam-era resistance" both inside and outside the military. He says the "Iraq Veterans Against the War (IVAW), patterned after its Vietnam-era namesake, Vietnam Veterans Against the War" was "never a large organization, with less than a thousand members and eight chapters at its peak in early 2008", but argues "it became the public face of dissent within a military increasingly plagued by poor morale." According to Cortright, "The most significant action organized by IVAW was the Winter Soldier hearing. The goal was to create a kind of truth commission that would cut through the propaganda of military and political leaders to tell Americans what was actually happening in Iraq and Afghanistan." About two hundred veterans and a few active-duty soldiers participated in these hearings in March 2008, with approximately fifty giving testimony. "Over three days of often emotional, poignant testimony at a labor center near Washington, D.C., the veterans told stories of their deployments in Iraq and Afghanistan, addressing themes such as disregard for the rules of engagement, dehumanization of the enemy, the breakdown of the military, sexual abuse, and profiteering by military contractors." Kelly Dougherty, an Army MP (Military Police), writes about the pervasive "culture of chauvinism and dehumanization" and said "we displayed a disturbing level of contempt towards the Iraqi people." She also speaks of the "stress of living within the military's abusive and misogynistic culture." She felt she "could never feel safe, even when I returned to my base." Jonathan Hutto, a black Navy sailor aboard the USS Theodore Roosevelt, was drawn into resistance by the racism he felt and observed in the Navy. "In February 2006," he writes, "some white petty officers displayed a hangman's noose in my face." He knew he was "ideologically opposed" to the war and in June 2006 joined with eleven other active-duty troops to launch the Appeal for Redress to end the war in Iraq. Camilo Mejia, a Nicaraguan U.S. Army infantryman, writes of his decision to refuse to return to the Iraq War. While stationed in Ar Ramadi, he was shocked to see the mistreatment of Iraqis, including "arbitrary detentions, torture, and shootings of unarmed civilians." While on furlough back in the U.S. he decided to take a public stance against the war and refused to go back. "My decision landed me in a military prison for nine months and prompted Amnesty International to declare me a prisoner of conscience."

=== Confronting the legacies of war ===
In this chapter, we hear from the Vietnamese, from veterans who feel a responsibility for what they did, and from the daughter of a veteran poisoned by Agent Orange. Madame Binh, Nguyễn Thị Bình, represented the National Liberation Front (NLF) during peace negotiations and played a major role in the Paris Peace Accords. She addresses American veterans and thanks those who opposed the war and joined organization like Vietnam Veterans Against the War and Veterans for Peace. She goes on to thank those who have moved beyond the past "to reconcile our two nations, to normalize relations and build friendly and cooperative relationships between our two peoples." And she expresses her appreciation for those "American veteran organizations [who] have also extended material support through humanitarian projects for Vietnam such as building schools and clinics." Tran Xuan Thao recalls as a child being implored by her mother "to grab hold of a tree" to protect herself as American warplanes flew overhead. But her message is one of friendship as she explains, "We know that for many years, so many Americans defied and resisted their government's war. And for all these years we have been able to differentiate the actions of your government from the love and solidarity of your people." Chuck Searcy was in Army Intelligence in Vietnam and turned against the war as he discovered it was based on lies. He returned to Vietnam in 1992 and made up his mind to help the Vietnamese recover from the war. He helped found an orthopedic workshop at a children's hospital in Hanoi and "learned that more than 100,000 children and adults had been killed or injured by unexploded ordnance" in the years between 1975 and 1995. "Every week", he writes, "there was a new report in the newspaper or on TV of a farmer or another child being killed or injured." He is still helping the Vietnamese recover and says he feels a "responsibility as an American, as a Vietnam vet, for what we did". Fredy Champagne was an infantry rifleman in Vietnam in 1965. Years later he felt he "had unfinished business with the Vietnamese people", and in 1988 he launched an organization which returned to Vietnam to help Vietnamese workers construct a Friendship Medical Clinic. Heather Bowser was about five years old when she went to her first Agent Orange awareness rally. She was born in 1972, "two months premature, missing several of my fingers, my big toe on my left foot, and my right leg below the knee." Her parents had no idea why until 1978 when they saw a Vietnam veteran named Paul Reutershan on The Today Show saying "I got killed in Vietnam and didn't know it." It turned out her father, who was stationed at Long Binh Army base in Vietnam, was sprayed daily with the dioxin-tainted herbicide called Agent Orange, which in addition to causing enormous environmental damage creates major health problems and birth defects in those exposed and their children. She writes about having "traveled to Vietnam four times to meet children who are still being born like me, due to residual dioxin in their environment." She continues, "My activism has taken me around the world, but it hasn't yet persuaded the U.S. government to take responsibility for what it did to those affected by Agent Orange."

=== Supporting, recording and recovering the legacy of GI dissent ===
As the book concludes we learn about organizations and individuals who supported the GI and veterans anti-Vietnam War movement and who have worked to preserve and foster its history and legacy. One of the most important was the United States Servicemen's Fund (USSF). USSF helped to support GI Coffeehouses, antiwar entertainment and GI underground newspapers. While working with USSF, Howard Levy suggested an "antiwar, pro-GI, Bob Hope–style spectacle, which would come to be called the FTA Show." Involving Jane Fonda, Donald Sutherland, Len Chandler, Holly Near, and others, it "became one of USSF's main attractions, and drew enormous audiences of GIs, both within the United States, and in Asia." Alan Pogue, an award-winning photojournalist, was a combat medic in Chu Lai, Vietnam in 1967. He writes about how he "became an atheist in a foxhole" and a photographer by using his Kodak Instamatic in Vietnam. One of the most remarkable repositories of documents and information on the GI and veterans resistance to the Vietnam War is located in the GI Press Collection of the Wisconsin Historical Society. This collection "contains over 88,000 page images with searchable text taken from more than 2,400 periodicals and other items such as pamphlets and posters created by or for U.S. military personnel during the Vietnam War era." Here we learn of the tireless efforts of James Lewes, who spent years, much of it single-handedly, compiling and digitizing this collection. William Short and Willa Seidenberg, many of whose photographs and oral histories are contained in the book, write about their five-year project document the resistance to the war.

An Afterword asks why "this important story become an almost secret history?" Answering that it has been erased by a "rightward shift in U.S politics" which has worked to turn the "most vibrant and diverse antiwar movement in U.S. history" into "a band of craven, self-righteous, draft-dodging campus hippies". Waging Peace, it argues, "gives us back an important piece" of our history.

== Reception ==
Waging Peace in Vietnam has received positive reviews. Seymour Hersh, the Pulitzer Prize recipient for his disclosure of the My Lai Massacre, says of the book, "To be in a military unit and oppose a war that had the blessing of one American president after another took extraordinary courage — the kind that was displayed by only a few in the Congress and, sad to say, by not many more in the media. The men and women who spoke out, often at great cost, during the immoral and unnecessary war in Vietnam are voices that need to be heard again and again, as they are in Waging Peace in Vietnam." The Public Historian called it "an important book" that explores "an important but still little-known social movement" and shows how the "most consistently rebellious troops in Vietnam and throughout the military were African Americans." The Progressive magazine called it "a new and fiercely compelling anthology about a wide swath of U.S. troops that were crucial to opposing the Vietnam War. The volume offers 'an almost-secret history' of a vast movement that ground down the high-powered U.S. war machine in Vietnam to a barely-functioning crawl." A Daily Collegian review quoted Christian Appy, a history professor at the University of Massachusetts, "There is really nothing like it in this vast literature of more than 40,000 books regarding the Vietnam War.... Waging Peace in Vietnam [is] the foremost catalogue of firsthand accounts of G.I. resistance in Vietnam in existence." Writing about the Waging Peace in Vietnam exhibit, Thomas Maresca of USA Today says "Hippies made the history books, but servicemembers risked prison". Hans Johnson, a contributing writer for HuffPost commented: "As the authors document — with a splendid compilation of essays & primary source material — rank-&-file, officer, & civilian opposition to the carnage changed the ground tactics & aerial bombardment strategy of the brutal 15-year war & hastened its end."

== Vietnamese Edition ==
The cover of the Vietnamese Edition of Waging Peace in Vietnam

On March 1, 2023 a Vietnamese edition of the book was officially launched in Ho Chi Minh City, Vietnam. With the Vietnamese title, Tranh đấu cho hòa bình, which translates as Fighting for Peace, it was published by the War Remnants Museum, one of the most popular museums in Vietnam. The museum contains exhibits relating to the First Indochina War and the Vietnam War, known to the Vietnamese as the Anti-French Resistance War and the American War. It was printed by the Trẻ (Youth) Publishing House, a Vietnamese book and magazine publisher. Present at the launch were Ronald Carver, the book's co-editor; Tôn Nữ Thị Ninh, former Ambassador of Vietnam to the European Union, Belgium and the Netherlands; Dr. Tran Xuan Thao, Director of the Museum; as well as Vietnam veterans and book contributors Ronald L. Haeberle, former U.S. Army combat photographer who took the infamous photos of the Mỹ Lai massacre; John Kent, Annapolis graduate and former U.S. Navy fighter pilot who refused to carry out bombing missions in Vietnam; and Tom Wilber, a twenty year U.S. Navy veteran, son of a U.S. Navy fighter pilot and prisoner of war in Hanoi's Hỏa Lò Prison, and co-author of Dissenting POWs: From Vietnam's Hoa Lo Prison to America Today. The Vietnamese newspaper Giáo dục reported that the book "tells the stories of men and women who performed the highest duty." Because they fought for justice, many had "to pay a heavy price" and the book "aims to honor their courage and memory, thereby helping the younger generation to better understand history."

== See also ==
- A Matter of Conscience
- Concerned Officers Movement
- Court-martial of Howard Levy
- Donald W. Duncan
- FTA Show - 1971 anti-Vietnam War road show for GIs
- F.T.A. - documentary film about the FTA Show
- Fort Hood Three
- GI's Against Fascism
- GI Coffeehouses
- GI Underground Press
- Movement for a Democratic Military
- Opposition to United States involvement in the Vietnam War
- Presidio mutiny
- Sir! No Sir!, a documentary about the anti-war movement within the ranks of the United States Armed Forces
- Soldiers in Revolt: GI Resistance During the Vietnam War, book about soldier & sailor resistance during the Vietnam War
- Stop Our Ship (SOS) anti-Vietnam War movement in and around the U.S. Navy
- Vietnam Veterans Against the War
- Winter Soldier Investigation
