= Unsatisfied Black Soldiers =

Radical Black U.S. soldier organization (1970–1971)

- Formation: Early 1970
- Dissolved: Late 1971
- Headquarters: Heidelberg, Germany
- Location(s): Patton, Coleman, Mannheim and Turley Barracks
- Founder: Sergeant Samuel Berry
- Chairman: Specialist 4 William Holland
- Political Advisor: Sergeant Ronald Hassell

The Unsatisfied Black Soldiers (UBS) was an organization of Black U.S. soldiers formed in West Germany in the early 1970s. They were centered in the Mannheim/Heidelberg area with members from the Patton, Coleman, Mannheim and Turley U.S. Army Barracks. They were founded on April 14, 1970, by Vietnam veteran Sergeant Samuel Berry when he organized a "political awareness program" to educate his fellow Black brothers and sisters. They were the largest and most influential of a number of Black GI organizations that formed in West Germany in the early 1970s, including the Black Action Group at the Panzer Barracks in Stuttgart and the Black Dissent Group at Smiley Barracks in Karlsruhe. These groups would hold study and rap sessions on their bases using books like Eldridge Cleaver's Soul on Ice and Claude Brown's Manchild in the Promised Land. They were also influenced by the Black Panther Party. Together they established a central "Defense Committee" with representatives from "twenty-five different posts" and held monthly meetings sometimes attended by 100 to 150 soldiers. They put forward a platform of demands including: ending the Vietnam War, removing U.S. involvement in African countries, creation of a committee of enlisted men to approve all orders to confine GIs, hiring of more Blacks in Army related civilian jobs, creation of college prep classes for GIs, equal and adequate housing for Black GIs with families, and more.

The U.S. Army did not look favorably upon soldiers who were questioning or resisting the war or military regulations and orders, even more so if it was done publicly. As soon antiwar or anti-military activity was detected, commanders would make every effort to seek out and discipline the GIs responsible. This often meant that those involved found themselves discharged, transferred, court-martialed or even thrown in prison. According to The New York Times, the Army "tried to break up some" of the groups, and "pretended that others" did not exist." For UBS, this led to a high turnover of members and leaders and contributed to their demise in late 1971, less than two years after their founding.

== Founding ==
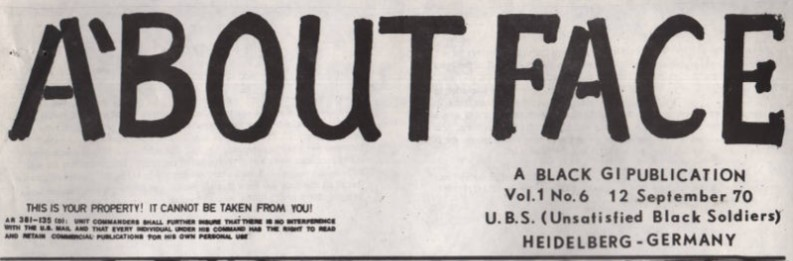
A'Bout Face Masthead, Vol.1, No.6, September 12, 1970

UBS was founded around May of 1970 and began putting out an underground newspaper called A'Bout Face on June 13, 1970. In this first issue they called themselves United Brothers and Sisters, but by issue number 2, which came out on July 4, 1970, they had become Unsatisfied Black Soldiers. Their first demand on the first page of the first issue was "STOP THE GOD-DAM WAR!", and they quoted the Black Panther Party, "We want all Black men to be exempt from military service." They said their paper was "the 'People's Paper'" and argued the U.S. was in Vietnam to expand imperialism. Quoting the U.S. Declaration of Independence, they said the "Vietnamese people should be allowed to 'alter' or to 'abolish' it's [sic] own Government". They also wrote about the racism they felt: "Every Black GI knows that he is oppressed." Comparing the treatment of Black GIs with that of white GIs of the same rank, they said, "He is being discriminated against (individual racism), and he is promoted much slower than whites are (institutional fascism)." They also made clear their enemy was not "whites in general, but the capitalist class, which is white." They called for all Blacks in the U.S. Army to "get organized", to "educate themselves in order to become good leaders of their brothers", and to "become disciplined revolutionaries."

On July 4, 1970, UBS joined with other organizations to convene a meeting of over a thousand Black GIs at Heidelberg University where they issued a Call for Justice. This document put forward a broad range of demands from ending the Vietnam War, to withdrawing U.S. interests in Africa, GI incarcerations, discrimination in the Army, education, jobs and housing. Here is their full list of demands in the Call for Justice:

1. All GIs out of Southeast Asia now.
2. Withdraw all U.S. interests from African countries.
3. Establish an investigating committee to review all cases of GIs, especially black and Puerto Rican, in the Mannheim stockade.
4. Establish a committee of EMs to approve all confinement orders of GIs.
5. Establish a record review board to eliminate discriminatory policies. Abolish the present promotion board.
6. Abolish the present IG (Inspector General) system, and replace it with a civilian advisory board.
7. Establish an effective committee to advise about-to-be-discharged GIs on what is really available in educational and occupational opportunities.
8. Hire more blacks in civilian jobs connected with the Army.
9. Initiate noncredit college preparatory classes to help GIs, regardless of color, to pass college entrance exams.
10. Equal and adequate housing for black GIs with families.

== Army's response ==
According to David Cortright, the author of the most authoritative book on the GI resistance to the Vietnam War, Soldiers in Revolt, the U.S. Army experienced "more internal turmoil in Germany" than anywhere other than Vietnam. By early 1971, the numbers of GIs active in the political movement "had grown to massive proportions." There were dozens of organizations and numerous radical underground newspapers at various German bases. The April 11, 1971 issue of the English-language Overseas Weekly summarized this with a two-page headline, "GIs Declare War on the Army". According to Time magazine, Army officers were "puzzled about how to handle" the dissent. One general in Augsburg organized "midnight flights" to whisk "troublemakers" back to the U.S., Stars and Stripes, the U.S. military newspaper, was "ordered to play down racial incidents", and the Seventh Army set up discussion groups to study the issue and suggest solutions. The investigation meetings were boycotted by members of UBS, as well as members of Black United Soldiers and Black Action Group, all of whom said they would have met off base where there was less likelihood of surveillance. Indeed, according to The New York Times, some of their members had faced courts-martial. "Just end racism and we'll stop organizing" a sergeant told a reporter. A Black officer highlighted the complexity of the situation when he said, "The problems will not end among our troops until it ends in America."

All of this became "so volatile" that the Pentagon sent "a team of military and civilian experts to investigate" the "race thing" in September 1970. The team heard from Black troops who complained "about discriminatory patterns within the military." They also heard from white soldiers who complained that Black soldiers were seeing "racial prejudice where none exists". Army spokesmen argued that for the most part "black and white soldiers get along without fighting". And yet a "senior infantry officer" was quoted as saying "race is our most serious internal problem" and a white junior officer reported that racial problems took all his time, "and then I get around to running a company." Black soldiers complained of "harassment" by white members of the Military Police and racial threats and slurs from non-commissioned officer's. In September 1970 "a Ku Klux Klan-style cross was found burning outside a Mannheim barracks" and it happened at least two other times at other Army bases in West Germany. At the Kelley Barracks in Heidelberg the Confederate flag was reported as "prominently displayed in the window of the Military Police headquarters."

Shortly after the investigation team's departure, General James H. Polk, the commander of U.S. Army in Europe, launched a program of "flying squads" of investigators who began making unannounced visits to German bases to look for "evidence of discrimination against Black" soldiers. He said, "We don't know if it will work. It is experimental. I see it as putting teeth in my statement that there will be no discrimination in this command." When the investigation's report was issued in December 1970, it confirmed that "racial discrimination" in the military "could impair...combat effectiveness." The report said Black troops "angrily told us that they had no reason to be fighting in a white man's army and in a white man's war". It continued, "They said their place was back in the United States...where they could fight to liberate and free their black sisters and brothers from the dirty, stinking, teeming ghettos and from all forms of racial bigotry and oppression." It listed "the failure of command leadership" as their principle concern, and several months later 10 or 12 officers, "from general down to company grade," had been relieved of command, transferred or reprimanded" for failing to implement regulations directed at improving racial relations. Polk himself, was one of those relieved of duty during this period.

== UBS response ==
The Army's efforts did not seem to impress UBS. The Sept. 12, 1970 issue of their newspaper A'Bout Face called for "A Day of Solidarity" to restate the demands originally set out in the "Call for Justice." And it directly called out the "Racism being practiced and sanctioned right here in the Military at all levels from Head-Pig Gen Polk down to Racist 1st Shirts" (1st Shirts is military slang for 1st Sergeants). They said they were unsatisfied with the official investigating committees that came to Europe and still "failed to see the problem, let alone find a solution." They addressed the investigating teams directly, "If you are not a solution— you are part of the Problem!!!!!!!!!!!!!" Even while the Army's investigation was underway, 200 Black soldiers met at Neureut Kaserne, the U.S. Army military base in Karlsruhe, Germany. The called for a United Front to oppose the "racial injustices" that Black soldiers "have suffered and are now suffering at the hands of the Racist Pigs that run the military system here in Germany."

== 1971 ==
In early 1971, UBS was even angrier and focusing more on the unequal treatment of Black soldiers in the brig and under the military justice system. According to one Black soldier writing from the brig and printed on the front page of the January 15, 1971 issue of A'Bout Face, the only reason he was in the Mannheim brig with 306 other Black prisoners was because he was Black and spoke up to defend himself. He called the brig a "concentration camp" and argued he was only there because he was "a threat to the Pig Power structure" who had "to be separated from the outside world as long as possible." He felt the situation should be turned upside down, that "Uncle Sam should be taken to court and charged with Genocide, mass murder of millions, economic murder, political murder, mental murder, and social murder." The New York Times had pointed out that even though Black soldiers made up only "some 13 per cent of the Army in West Germany" in late 1970, they represented "about 50 per cent of the stockade population and receive[d] at least 25 per cent of battalion-level punishment."

By the fifth 1971 issue of A'Bout Face, UBS was stressing the importance of understanding and exposing what they called "the purpose of the armed forces" of the U.S. On page 1 they said the military was "used to protect the interest and the way of life for those people in power." Its role on "the international level" was similar to the way "fascist pig policemen" were used "on a domestic level." "The RACIST military patrols the world, invade non-white oppressed countries, in the same manner that the fascist pig policemen invade and patrol the Black Colonies in Babylon." Here they were following the lead of the Black Panther Party who used the word Babylon as a metaphor for the oppressive, capitalist, and racist systems of the U.S.

The A'Bout Face dated August 27, 1971 was the last issue put out by UBS. Its first page headline was, "DEATH TO THE PIGS OF CAPITALIAM! RACISM! FASCISM! IMPERIALISM!" They again condemned the Vietnam War and upheld the antiwar efforts of the four students who had recently been killed for protesting at Kent State University. The said the students knew the war "wasn't to protect the people, but to protect the PIG CAPITALISM of the ruling class". Further, they said the war was for the purpose of putting "Coca Cola, Singer Sewing Machine, U.S. Royal, Texaco and etc." into Southeast Asia.

At some point after this last issue of A'Bout Face, UBS ceased to exist. Whether they voluntarily disbanded, or merged into another group called the Black Disciple Party (see below), or were rendered ineffective by the Army's disciplinary measures, or experienced a combination of all of these things, is unclear. In November 1971 the group's founder, Samuel Berry, now "a political science student at Bowie State College in Maryland, appeared before a hearing of the Congressional Black Caucus. He argued there had been little improvement in the Army and the "potential for violence" had heightened. He cited "'frustrations' over attempts to end racism" and told the committee there were now "20 black organizations in 10 German cities allied with 'all segments of progressive thinking people.'"

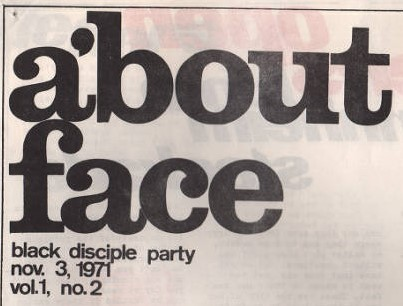
A'bout Face 2 Masthead

=== Black Disciple Party ===
There was a second version of A'bout Face which started publishing in Heidelberg the month after the last issue of the first version. It was produced by the Black Disciple Party and lasted for four issues from September to December 1971. They seemed to have had some political differences with the Unsatisfied Black Soldiers and called for more action. As they put it, "We now study ways and means to destroy or bring this military system to a screeching halt."

== See also ==
- Darnell Stephen Summers
- Fort Hood Three
- Soldiers in Revolt: GI Resistance During the Vietnam War
