= George A. Lopez =

American international relations scholar

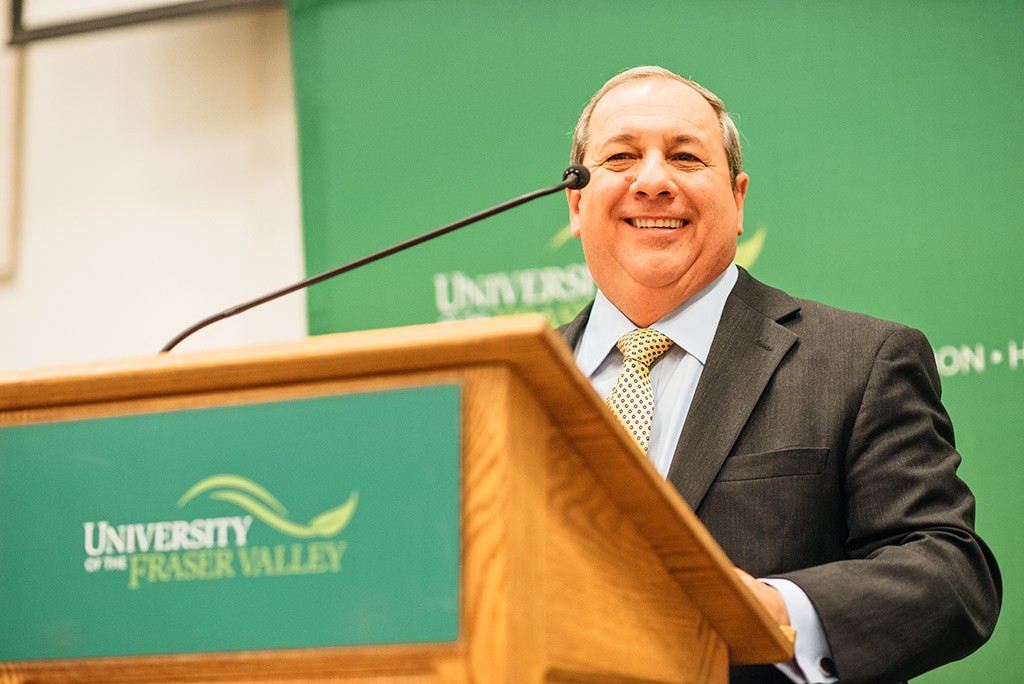
- Citizenship: American
- Education: Syracuse University (PhD)
- Occupation: International relations scholar
- Employer: University of Notre Dame

George A. Lopez is an American international relations scholar. He is founding faculty of the Kroc Institute for International Peace Studies at the University of Notre Dame where he holds the Rev. Theodore M. Hesburgh, C.S.C. Chair in Peace Studies. Lopez researches state violence and coercion, especially economic sanctions, human rights, ethics and the use of force.

== Education ==
He received a Ph.D. (ABD) from Syracuse University in 1975.

== Career ==
From 1988 through 1998, he chaired the Selection Committee of the Research and Writing Grants Committee of the MacArthur Foundation's Program in Peace and International Cooperation.

Lopez's investigation of UN sanctions on Iraq began in 1993 when he was asked to assist the UN Department of Humanitarian Affairs to develop methodologies for assessing sanctions impact. With David Cortright and Alistair Millar, Lopez wrote Winning Without War: Sensible Security Options for Dealing with Iraq in October 2002. The policy brief presented an alternative to the invasion of Iraq. Lopez and Cortight's research detailing the unlikely presence of WMDs in Iraq was detailed before the war in Disarming Iraq in Arms Control Today (September 2002) and re-articulated after the war in Containing Iraq: the Sanctions Worked in Foreign Affairs (July/August, 2004).

As a Senior Jennings Randolph Fellow at the United States Institute of Peace in Washington, D.C. for 2009–10, Lopez wrote a small pamphlet called Can Sanctions Survive?

Lopez's work has been published in Human Rights Quarterly, International Studies Quarterly, Journal of International Affairs, The International Journal of Human Rights, Foreign Policy, Foreign Affairs, and Mad Magazine. With Michael Stohl, he has been editor and contributor to five books on repression and state terror, including Government Violence and Repression: An Agenda for Research (1986).

Since 2001, much of his writing has been devoted to debates regarding ethics and the use of force in the "war on terror". His commentaries have been published in The New York Times, the LA Times, the Chicago Tribune, The Boston Globe, The Christian Science Monitor, The Indianapolis Star and every month for 2005 and 2006 in La Opinión.
