= David Cortright =

American peace studies scholar (1946-)

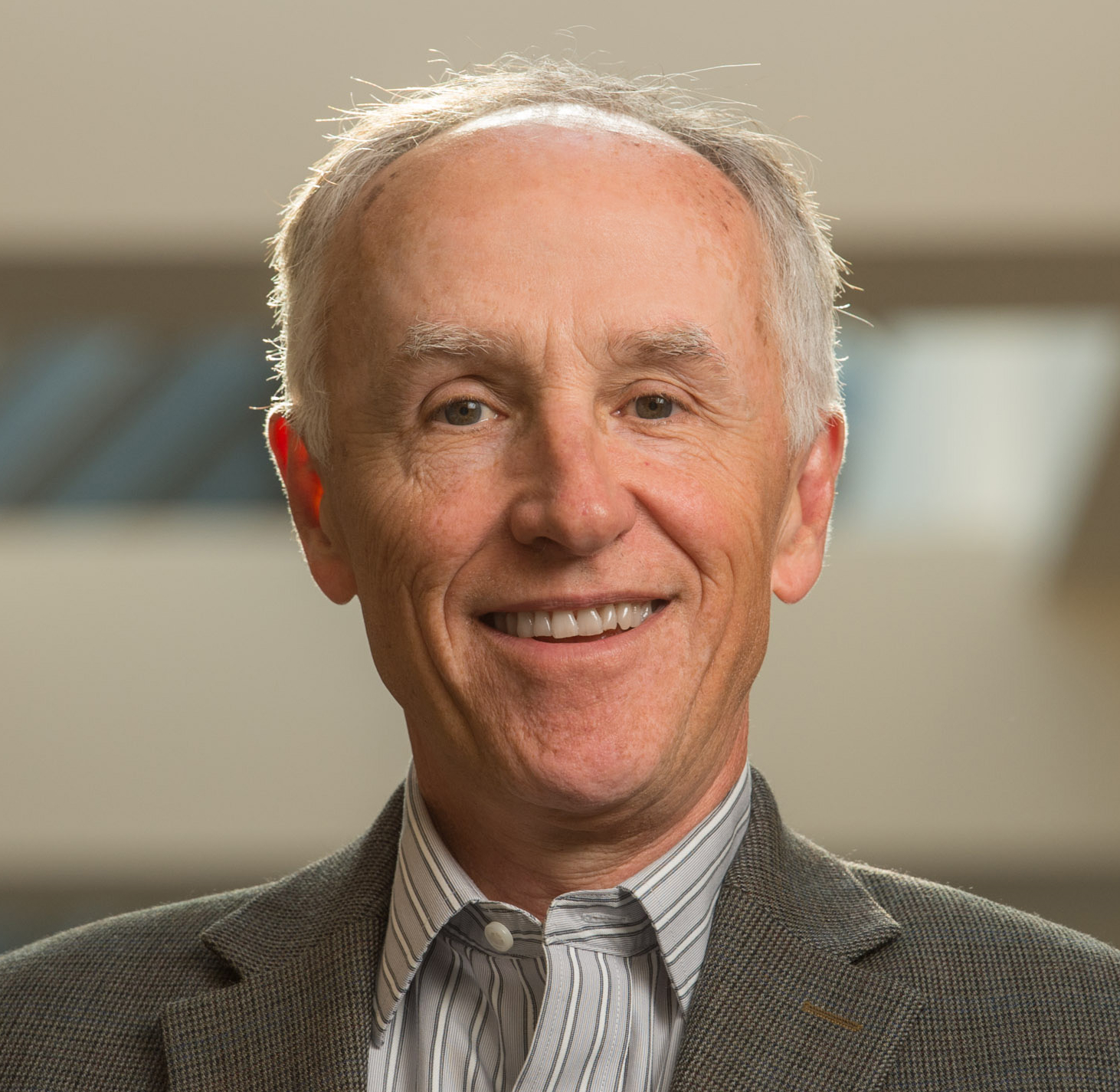
- David Cortright - Professor Emeritus at the Keough School of Global Affairs
- Born: November 15, 1946 (age 79); East Stroudsburg, PA

Academic work
- Institutions: University of Notre Dame
- Notable works: Soldiers in Revolt: GI Resistance During the Vietnam War; Waging Peace in Vietnam: U.S. Soldiers and Veterans Who Opposed the War; Peace: A History of Movements and Ideas

David Cortright is an American scholar and peace activist. He is a veteran who is currently professor emeritus and special adviser for policy studies at the Keough School of Global Affairs and Kroc Institute for International Peace Studies at the University of Notre Dame, and the author, co-author, editor or co-editor of 22 books. Cortright has a long history of public advocacy for disarmament and the prevention of war.

== Biography ==
Cortright is a 1968 graduate of the University of Notre Dame. In 1970 he received his M.A. from New York University, and completed his doctoral studies in 1975 at the Union Institute in residence at the Institute for Policy Studies in Washington, D.C.

As a soldier during the Vietnam War, Cortright joined with fellow soldiers to speak out against the war as part of the GI peace movement. He was 1 of 1,365 servicemen who signed an antiwar ad in The New York Times published on November 9, 1969 (see image below).

In 1977, Cortright was named the executive director of The Committee for a SANE Nuclear Policy (SANE), which under his direction became the largest disarmament organization in the U.S. Cortright initiated the 1987 merger of SANE and the Nuclear Weapons Freeze Campaign and served for a time as co-director of the merged organization. In 2002 Cortright helped to found the Win Without War coalition in opposition to the U.S. invasion of Iraq.

In 1992 he was named President of the Fourth Freedom Forum, an operating foundation based in Indiana. Cortright worked in cooperation with George A. Lopez at the Kroc Institute to guide the Forum in sponsoring conferences and publications on strategies for enhancing the effectiveness of multilateral economic sanctions and reducing humanitarian harms.

In 2014 he joined with Tom Hayden and others from the anti-Vietnam War movement to demand that the Department of Defense change a "rose-colored portrayal" of the Vietnam War on the government agency's website. Following the 2016 Colombian peace agreement referendum, he served as Director of the Kroc Institute's Peace Accords Matrix to support implementation of the 300-page agreement.

== Work ==
Cortright is widely known for his pioneering scholarship and sustained advocacy in several interconnected areas of peace and conflict studies. Central to his work is the promotion of nonviolent social change and civil resistance as powerful tools for achieving political and social justice. Drawing from his own experiences as a Vietnam-era soldier who actively organized protests within the military, Cortright has emphasized the critical role that grassroots activism plays in shaping broader political movements and influencing public policy. His leadership in the nuclear disarmament movement is particularly notable. Cortright was involved in the nuclear freeze campaign of the 1980s, which mobilized millions of Americans to freeze and reverse the arms race and helped shift public opinion on Cold War arms control.

Beyond disarmament, Cortright has made substantial contributions to understanding and advocating for the strategic use of multilateral sanctions and incentives as effective instruments for international conflict prevention and resolution.

His research, often in collaboration with other experts, has influenced how governments and international organizations apply sanctions not just as punitive measures but as nuanced tools to encourage compliance with peace agreements and international norms. He has provided research services to several foreign ministries, including those of Canada, Sweden, Switzerland, Japan, Germany, Denmark, and The Netherlands, and has advised agencies of the United Nations, the Carnegie Commission on Preventing Deadly Conflict, the International Peace Academy, and the John D. and Catherine T. MacArthur Foundation.

He collaborated with George A. Lopez, Alistair Millar and others in analyzing nonmilitary means of countering terrorism and violent extremism.

He worked with civil society organizations to analyze the often harmful impacts of counterterrorism measures on development and peacebuilding activities in affected countries. He co-authored the report Friend Not Foe, with support from the Dutch development agency Cordaid. He was a consultant to Catholic Relief Services on guidelines for improving governance in local communities receiving development and humanitarian assistance.

Cortright's historical analyses of peace movements in the United States, including the Iraq antiwar movement, the Nuclear Freeze movement and the Vietnam antiwar movement, highlight the complex interplay between mass protest, electoral politics, and shifts in government policy. He documents how these movements, driven by diverse coalitions of activists, veterans, students, and faith communities, were instrumental in ending wars and reshaping American attitudes toward military engagement and nuclear policy.

Cortright's work bridges the gap between local grassroots activism and global peace policy, illustrating how participatory and inclusive approaches at the community level can contribute to sustainable peace and governance worldwide.

=== Vietnam War Activism and Early Peace Advocacy ===
Cortright's journey as a peace activist began during his service in the U.S. Army amid the Vietnam War. Drafted in 1968 at the height of the conflict, Cortright was initially a non-political young man from a conservative Catholic working-class family. He volunteered for the Army Band to avoid infantry combat, and was stationed at Fort Wadsworth, New York, and later at Ft. Bliss Texas. Early exposure to the realities of the war and conversations with returning veterans deeply challenged the official military narrative he had been taught.

As he immersed himself in studying the history of Vietnam, including reading a biography of Ho Chi Minh, Cortright came to view the Vietnamese struggle as one for independence rather than Communist aggression, likening Ho Chi Minh to a George Washington figure.

Struggling with these realizations, Cortright experienced intense internal conflict about his role in the military and contemplated options such as desertion and conscientious objection but ultimately sought a path of open dissent that would allow him to stay engaged with his family and community. Inspired by early examples of organized opposition within the military such as the American Servicemen's Union at Fort Sill, Oklahoma, he decided to join the growing GI antiwar resistance movement.

Despite the risks, including potential military discipline, Cortright actively organized protests, circulated underground newspapers, and fostered discussions among soldiers opposing the war.

His activism reflected a broader surge of opposition within the ranks that significantly contributed to shifting public opinion and applying pressure on U.S. policymakers.

When Cortright and other soldiers at Ft. Wadsworth faced disciplinary punishments, he and his colleagues filed a lawsuit against the army in federal court, Cortright v Resor. The Eastern District of New York ruled in favor of the plaintiffs, but the Second Circuit Court of Appeals overturned the ruling.

Cortright's experience as an active-duty soldier turned peace activist laid the foundation for his lifelong commitment to nonviolent social change, disarmament, and peace advocacy.

== Books ==
He is the author or co-editor of 22 books:

- Cortright, David (2025-05-19). Protest and Policy in the Iraq, Nuclear Freeze and Vietnam Peace Movements. Cambridge University Press. ISBN 978-1-009-64027-5.
- A Peaceful Superpower: Lessons from the World's Largest Antiwar Movement (New York: New Village Press, 2023); shorter booklet A Peaceful Superpower: The Movement against War in Iraq (Goshen, Ind.: Fourth Freedom Forum, 2004).
- Truth Seekers: Voices of Peace and Nonviolence (Maryknoll, New York: Orbis Books, 2020); published in an early edition as Buscadors de la Veritat: Veus per la pau i la noviolència (Barcelona: International Catalan Institute for Peace, 2017)
- Waging Peace in Vietnam: U.S. Soldiers and Veterans Who Opposed the War, co-edited with Barbara Doherty and Ron Carver (New York: New Village Press, 2019)
- Governance for Peace: How Inclusive, Participatory and Accountable Institutions Promote Peace and Prosperity, co-authored with Conor Seyle and Kristin Wall (Cambridge: Cambridge University Press, 2017)
- Civil Society, Peace and Power, co-edited with Melanie Greenberg and Laurel Stone (Lanham, MD: Rowman & Littlefield Publishing, 2016).
- Drones and the Future of Armed Conflict, co-edited with Rachel Fairhurst and Kristen Wall (Chicago, IL: The University of Chicago Press, 2015).
- Ending Obama's War: Responsible Military Withdrawal from Afghanistan (Boulder, CO: Paradigm Publishers, 2011).
- Towards Nuclear Zero with Raimo Väyrynen (London: IISS, Routledge, 2010).
- Gandhi and Beyond: Nonviolence for A New Political Age, 2nd ed. (Boulder, Colo.: Paradigm Publishers, 2009); first edition Gandhi and Beyond (Paradigm, 2006).
- Peace: A History of Movements and Ideas (Cambridge: Cambridge University Press, 2008).
- Uniting Against Terror: Cooperative Nonmilitary Responses to the Global Terrorist Threat, co-edited with George A. Lopez (Cambridge, Mass.: The MIT Press, 2007).
- Soldiers in Revolt: GI Resistance During the Vietnam War, 2nd ed. (Chicago: Haymarket Books, 2005); original edition Soldiers in Revolt: The American Military Today (New York: Anchor/Doubleday, 1975).
- Sanctions and the Search for Security: Challenges to UN Action, with George A. Lopez (Boulder, Colo.: Lynne Rienner Publishers, 2002).
- Smart Sanctions: Targeting Economic Statecraft, co-edited with George A. Lopez (Lanham, Md.: Rowman & Littlefield, 2002).
- The Sanctions Decade: Assessing UN Strategies in the 1990s, with George A. Lopez (Boulder, Colo.: Lynne Rienner Publishers, 2000).
- Pakistan and the Bomb: Public Opinion and Nuclear Options, co-edited with Samina Ahmed (Notre Dame, Ind.: University of Notre Dame Press, 1998 and Karachi: Oxford University Press, 1999).
- The Price of Peace: Incentives and International Conflict Prevention, editor (Lanham, Md.: Rowman & Littlefield, 1997), commissioned by The Carnegie Commission on Preventing Deadly Conflict.
- Political Gain and Civilian Pain: Humanitarian Impacts of Economic Sanctions, co-edited with Thomas G. Weiss, George A. Lopez, and Larry Minear (Lanham, Md.: Rowman & Littlefield, 1997).
- India and the Bomb: Public Opinion and Nuclear Options, co-edited with Amitabh Mattoo (Notre Dame, Ind.: University of Notre Dame Press, 1996).
- Economic Sanctions: Panacea or Peacebuilding in a Post–Cold War World? co-edited with George A. Lopez (Boulder, Colo.: Westview Press, 1995).
- Peace Works: The Citizen's Role in Ending the Cold War (Boulder, Colo.: Westview Press, 1993).
- Left Face: Soldier Unions and Resistance Movements in Modern Armies, with Max Watts (Westport, Conn.: Greenwood Press, 1991).

== See also ==
- List of peace activists
