= Dissenting POWs: From Vietnam's Hoa Lo Prison to America Today =

Non-fiction book about Vietnam War POWs opposed to the war

- Authors: Tom Wilber and Jerry Lembcke
- Language: English, Vietnamese (2023)
- Genre: Military history
- Publisher: Monthly Review Press
- Publication date: April 2021
- Publication place: United States
- Pages: 160
- ISBN: 978-1-58367-908-1
- Website: https://monthlyreview.org/9781583679081/

Dissenting POWs: From Vietnam's Hoa Lo Prison to America Today is a 2021 non-fiction book by Tom Wilber and Jerry Lembcke, published by Monthly Review Press. The book is about the American POWs who dissented from the Vietnam War and whose story contradicted the official American POW narrative. Wilber and Lembcke argue all previous books on the POWs have given little attention to those POWs who dissented, and that this full history has been consciously obscured. They further suggest that this work can provide a place where future GIs and civilian resisters can look for role models and allies "in their efforts to end U.S. wars of aggression."

The "official story", as told in the book P.O.W.: A Definitive History of the American Prisoner-of-War Experience in Vietnam, 1964–1973 and other early accounts, is that the POWs were "stalwart warriors who resisted to the maximum under the most abominable and abusive conditions," although by 1971 "at least 30 percent and perhaps as many as 50 percent of the prisoners were disillusioned about the war and becoming increasingly cynical about it."

The book has been positively received by a number of reviewers (see Reception below for details).

== Authors ==
Wilber, the son of former POW U.S. Navy Captain Gene Wilber, made "more than thirty investigative trips to Vietnam" gathering extensive new material, including POW's handwritten documents, letters from POW family members, texts for POW broadcasts on Radio Hanoi, and more. He also interviewed former Vietnamese prison guards, staff workers and administrators from Hỏa Lò Prison, known to American POWs as the Hanoi Hilton. His research provides the foundation for the "untold story" in Dissenting POWs. Lembcke, a Vietnam veteran and Associate Professor Emeritus of Sociology at Holy Cross College, is the author of eight books, including The Spitting Image and Hanoi Jane.

== Official story ==
Over the course of the Vietnam War, over 700 American pilots and ground troops were captured by the Vietnamese. Ground troops were mostly captured in South Vietnam and transported to North Vietnam, while pilots were mainly shot down during bombing runs over North Vietnam. The authors document that, especially during the latter years of the war, dissent was "a fact of life" within the POW population, just as it was among US GIs (see here and here) and veterans (here) and among broader populations within the US and around the world (here). And, as in the larger populations, there were pro-war loyalists among the POWs who were led by the Senior Ranking Officers (SROs). The SROs threatened the dissidents with "courts-martial and even violence", and when these threats didn't work, the doubters were isolated and ostracized.

As the war ended and the prisoners were released in 1973, the Pentagon launched Operation Homecoming to celebrate their return. But amid the celebration was controversy as eight enlisted men and two officers were soon facing charges for being "bitter critics" of the war as prisoners. Before the end of the year, however, all the charges were dismissed for "lack of sufficient evidence" and the narrative surrounding their dissent began to shift. Soon, the official story of these ten dissidents, and other POWs who agreed and/or sympathized with them, as told by the White House, the US press and the forthcoming POW books, was that "they were the deviants"—"loners, losers, alienated, and maladjusted". This would be contrasted with the "upright manliness" of the "hardcore loyalists" who refused to question their role in the war. The New York Times editorialized in 1973 that "..the Government would prefer not to let people speak for themselves without first straining and homogenizing their words in a public relations blender."

An early stage of this shift in coverage was evident when the co-author's father, Gene Wilber, who came to oppose the war during his captivity, appeared on an April 1, 1973 CBS 60 Minutes show. He described reexamining himself, "I had time to sit for many hours...I had time to really find out what Gene Wilber was like." "I happened to be a Christian and found out that my conscience bothered me. ...conscience and morality—started to show itself." Mike Wallace for CBS, reminded Wilber, "After all, you were a career officer—you weren't a child." Then Wallace quoted one of the hardcore loyalists, "...it's those guys who fink out who get you. Those guys will get what's coming to them." Even though Wilber had stuck to his principles and his conscience he was having his manhood questioned and threats repeated to him on national television. The official narrative was shifting towards maladjustment—the "rebels weren't criminals so much as emotionally and psychologically hurt, sick, damaged goods". A June New York Times article raised the concerns of the Pentagon's health chief over "the potential for violence" among former POWs. In July, another piece in the same paper titled Antiwar P.O.W.'s: A Different Mold Scarred by Their Combat Experiences highlighted the suicide of one of the antiwar POWs and discussed how painful the dissidents readjustment had been. Dissenting POWs makes the case that the "official story" is a false and one-sided narrative.

=== Exaggerated tales of torture ===
A central element of the official POW story is that of torture. Dissenting POWs submits new and little known information about this narrative and says "[p]ostwar studies raised serious questions about the claims". It points out that the most oft-cited "record" of torture is "the memories of the prisoners themselves", which for the hardcore loyalists is colored by their "own self-interest in maintaining...the hero-prisoner-at-war narrative." Even looking at those memories, "[a]lmost all accounts agree that there was no torture after 1969". Prior to that, some of those captured said they were tortured, some say they weren't and most "remained silent on the issue." It also notes that knowledgeable Vietnamese have "always denied using torture". Even with all the political changes in Vietnam, the defections and emigration over the years to the U.S. and other countries, "no former guards or prison administrators have corroborated the charges of the former POWs." In 2008, the London Times interviewed Tran Trong Duyet, the former director of Hỏa Lò Prison, about former POW and U.S. Senator John McCain who described being tortured as a captive. Duyet said, "He was very brave, very manly, he dared to argue with me and he was very intelligent." But he also said, "I never tortured or mistreated the POWs and nor did my staff.... it’s not as if they had important information we needed to extract." The Times also interviewed Nguyen Tien Tran, another director at the prison, who confirmed Duyet's story: “We had a clear code of taking care of the injured. We did our best to patch McCain up and he was treated by a good doctor. Why would he say that he was tortured?"

Dissenting POWs notes that although official accounts argued that it was torture that coerced some POWs into making antiwar statements and broadcasts, none of the dissidents singled out upon their return reported being tortured. In fact, the group of enlisted ground troops and helicopter crews captured in South Vietnam were, if anything, "even more opposed to the war despite not having been tortured".

In 1975, Amnesty International reported that when the POWs arrived at Clark Air Base in the Philippines in 1973, their condition was "really good. That applies to their mental, physical and dental conditions." Although it also noted, "That a man was relatively healthy in 1973 does not prove that he was not tortured in 1969." POW Gene Wilber, who was shot down as a 38 year old senior officer and air squadron commander with a leaders knowledge of battle plans and tactics. Wilber described his treatment as "not very kind" but said he "was not physically beaten" or treated badly the way some others had "described".

Dissenting POWs also draws attention to the idea that self-inflicted harm may have played into the torture narrative. For the hardliners, "torture became a way to confirm their worth as American warriors.... When the torture they wanted from the Vietnamese wasn't forthcoming, they provoked it. When that didn't work, they inflicted their own damage." At one point, James Stockdale, out of fear he would be filmed "for propaganda purposes", "battered his own face with a stool and cut his scalp to create wounds that would appear to have been inflicted by his captors." For similar reasons, Robinson Risner, tried to damage his voice so he couldn't be forced to read over Radio Hanoi. As he described it in his memoir, "I began pounding my throat as hard as I could." When that didn't work, he tried using lye soap as an "acid treatment". He filled a cup with mashed soap and gargled with it, then screamed into a towel. He did this for three days and nights, but "one good cough the next day and his voice was back, leaving him with nothing but diarrhea for his effort."

=== Education not brainwashing ===
Many of the POW's stories talked about the education sessions the Vietnamese gave them. Army Captain John Dunn observed that "Our camp commander...seemed more interested in the psychological aspects of conversion rather than the application of torture". Air Force Captain Joseph Crecca wrote that while a prisoner he "had the opportunity to study Russian as well as to teach mathematics, physics, classical music, and automobile theory and mechanics." Many also described the education programs, which included the centuries long history of the Vietnamese independence struggles, the content of the 1954 Geneva Accords which had divided Vietnam into North and South, and basic political economy. The authors note that, "From what we know, there was little in the Hoa Lo 'lesson plans' for POWs that is not today the accepted wisdom of what the war was about."

== Dissenters ==
Dissenting POWs devotes two chapters to a discussion of the two officers and eight enlisted men who were singled out upon their return for their opposition to the war and for making public statements to that effect while in captivity. While there were a number of other POWs who dissented and disagreed with the war to varying degrees, these ten were singled out as the leaders and were the only ones who faced charges for their actions.

=== Officers ===
The officers were Marine Lieutenant Colonel Edison Miller, 36 years old at the time of capture, and Navy Commander Gene Wilber, at 38 years old. They were both pilots and the commanding officers of their respective flight squadrons. Because they were some of the most senior officers among the POWs, they complicated the hardcore narrative the SROs had hoped for.

==== Edison Miller ====
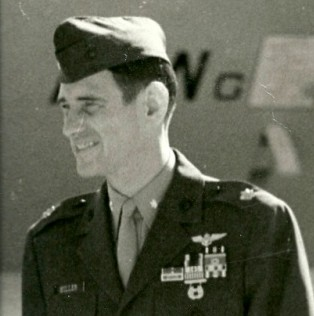
U.S. Marine Lieutenant Colonel Edison Miller

Miller was orphaned shortly after birth and raised in an orphanage until adopted at age five. As a teen he worked on farms and sold newspapers, enlisting in the military at eighteen. His talent and moxie were recognized early and he was selected for the aviation cadet program even without a college degree. By the time he was shot down over North Vietnam on October 13, 1967, he was the commanding officer of Marine Fighter Attack Squadron 323, flying the F-4B Phantom. His parachute didn't fully open, which caused a hard landing, severely injuring several vertebrae in his back and breaking his ankle. He spent five years four months as a POW and was the highest ranking Marine Corps officer among the prisoners.

On Mother's Day in 1971, Miller delivered a public message:

Today, America's mothers must face the fact that their sons are killing fellow human beings and destroying foreign countries for an unjust cause, making our actions not only illegal, but immoral.... My personal participation in this war is my personal shame and tragedy. My country's immoral and illegal actions which are now culminated in the tragedy of Vietnam is America's shame.

==== Gene Wilber ====
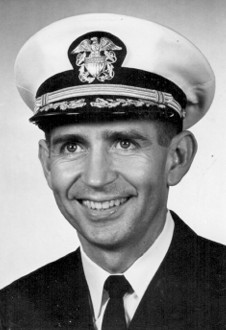
US Navy Commander Gene Wilber commander of Fighter Squadron 102 in 1968

Wilber was the son of poor tenant farmers who worked on a dairy farm. Graduating from high school in 1947, he soon enlisted in the Navy and, like Miller, joined the aviation cadet program. By 1968, he was the commanding officer of Strike Fighter Squadron 102 and flying F-4 Phantom IIs over North Vietnam. He was shot down on June 16, 1968.

During a 1970 interview with the Canadian television journalist Michael Maclear, Wilber made his sentiments about the war clear: "I think the answer of course is that the war must be ended, and it must be stopped now.... once we do that the Vietnamese can solve their own problems, I'm confident of that."

In mid-1972, Wilber and Miller joined with six other pilots who had recently been shot down to sign a letter to the well known CBS news anchor Walter Cronkite. The letter protested the "many innocent people dying a totally needless and senseless death" in the bombings.

=== Enlisted men ===
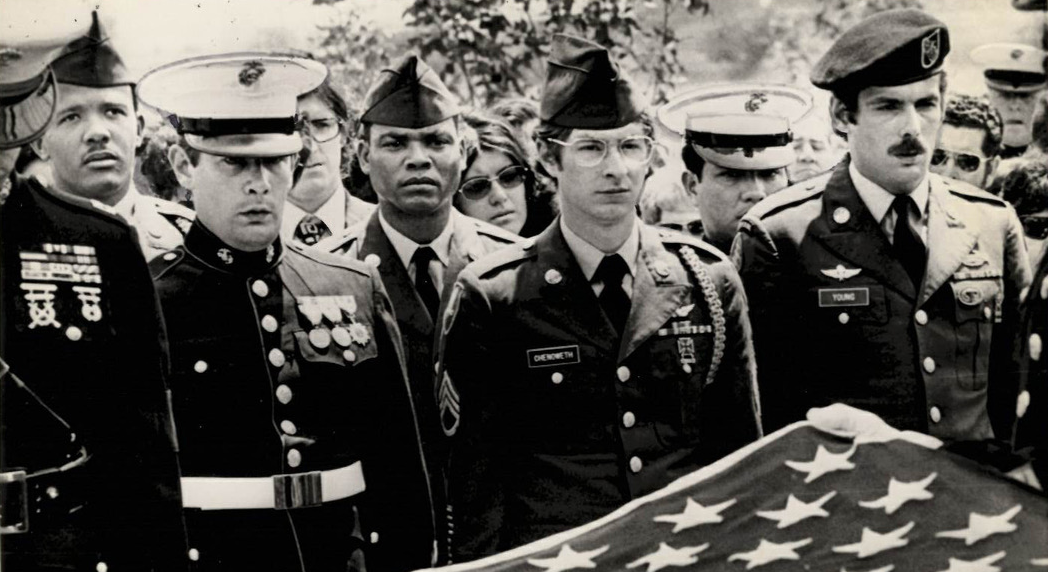
Seven Members of the Peace Committee of Vietnam War POWs in 1973. From left: Fred Elbert (just off photo), King David Rayford, Michael Branch, James Daly, Bob Chenoweth, Alfonso Riate and John Young as pallbearers for fellow Peace Committee member Larry Kavanaugh.

The enlisted men, whose average age was around 20, were Army Private First Class James Daly, Army Sargent Bob Chenoweth, Army Private First Class King David Rayford, Marine Corporal Alfonso Riate, Army Corporal John Young, Army Lance Corporal Michael Branch, Marine Corporal Fred Elbert, and Marine Corporal Larry Kavanaugh. These eight men came to be known as the Peace Committee, which at various times had several more members.

==== James Daly ====
Daly told his story in a 1975 memoir "A Hero's Welcome", co-written with Lee Bergman. It was republished in 2000 as "Black Prisoner of War: A Conscientious Objector's Vietnam Memoir". Prior to Daly's capture, he was moved by the poverty and sadness of the Vietnamese kids, "I really felt sorry for them—skinny, torn shirts and pants, bare feet, big sad eyes just staring out at you." He could also feel the deep hatred the local people felt for him and other American soldiers. As he described it:

The truth was, if you looked to see it, hatred for the Americans seemed to be just about everywhere. At first this really bugged me, made me angry in a way. Then, as I considered how miserably these Vietnamese peasants and farmers lived, how they’d suffered through so many years of war, how their small straw hootches had been destroyed so many times, or how they’d been forced to keep on moving from one place to another, I began to understand why they felt like they did.... the Vietnamese just weren’t the monsters we’d been told they were. In the four years I’d been in Vietnam, since I first saw those poor tattered kids in Chu Lai staring up at me and begging. I’d come across a good number of the Vietnamese people. I’d seen or talked with them in the villages of the south, traveling the Ho Chi Minh Trail, as a POW, on the battlefield.... the more Vietnamese I came in contact with, the more I knew in my gut what I had believed before in my head — that the war was wrong and we had no right to be there tearing this country to pieces.

==== Bob Chenoweth ====
Chenoweth grew up in Portland, Oregon where his dad was a telephone company technician. The family lived from paycheck to paycheck and the kids would often make extra money by picking beans and fruit at local farms. Like Daly, he identified with the Vietnamese people and was disturbed by the "racist views of most Americans towards the Vietnamese." He felt the Army's training was "the foundation of the race hatred soldiers later exhibited toward the Vietnamese." He was 21 years old and riding as a machine-gunner on a UH-1 Huey helicopter when it came under fire and crashed in a cemetery. He was quickly captured and spent the next five years as a POW.

Over time in captivity, "he began to see the American effort in Vietnam as 'a war of aggression...on a massive scale.'" When asked about charges that he was a traitor, he responded, "I thought the people...running the war, the people who had gotten us into the war in the first place, those were the traitors". He felt those who were opposed to the war were the real patriots. He soon became the recognized leader of the Peace Committee. He studied Marxism while a POW and said, "it was the beginning of a new way of looking at the world". When asked whether he felt he had been brainwashed, he responded, maybe, "but no more so than he had been by American culture before he went to war." Upon his return home, he joined the antiwar movement and toured the country with the activists Jane Fonda and Tom Hayden.

==== King David Rayford ====
Rayford was a Black Army GI drafted "off the Ford assembly line in Detroit." His parents had been sharecroppers in Mississippi. He was captured on July 2, 1967, in South Vietnam and spent over six years as a prisoner. He was one of the early members of the Peace Committee, along with Chenoweth and Riate.

==== Alfonso Riate ====
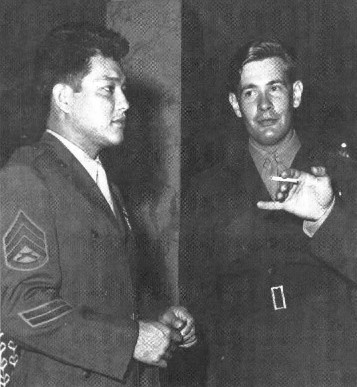
Former POWs SSgt Alfonso Riate and Pvt Frederick Elbert 1973

Riate was born in Sebastopol, California, the son of a Filipino dad and Native American mother who was a member of the Karuk Tribe. He moved to Los Angeles where he attended high school and took some classes at Long Beach Community College before joining the Marines in 1965. He volunteered for Vietnam where he was captured in Quảng Trị province in April 1967. While detained at the Portholes POW camp in the south of North Vietnam, he managed to escape from a work detail outside the camp. He took advantage of his Filipino-Indian dark complexion and knowledge of some Vietnamese to blend in with the local population. According to Chenoweth, he lasted for two days, but then walked into a North Vietnamese Army camp and "sat down for tea with the soldiers!" His cover was quickly blown and the prison camp guards soon arrived to take him back. By 1971, he was in Hỏa Lò Prison with the other members of the Peace Committee.

Daly wrote about Riate in his memoir. He described an April 1972 B-52 bombing raid on Hanoi, saying he was shocked the U.S. would bomb "heavily populated areas". Daly felt "so sick and ashamed and sad at what my country was doing to these Vietnamese people—that I started to cry." During the bombing, Daly noticed that Riate was over on his bed writing. It turned out to be a letter to the prison camp commander stating that Riate was willing "to do anything possible to help end the war." He was "even ready to consider joining the North Vietnamese army, if that was the only way he could help!" Soon, Chenoweth and Young asked if they could sign the letter, then "one by one" every one of the eight on the Peace Committee signed the letter. This letter became a central element of the charges against the Peace Committee for "conspiracy against the U.S. government" once they returned home, which were quickly dropped (as discussed above).

==== John Young ====
Young "described himself as more middle class" than most of the other dissenters, and said he had not even heard of Vietnam before joining the military. He was an Army Specialist Green Beret captured in January 1968. He was badly wounded and "carried by hammock for about a month along jungle trails" until arriving at a home of the Bru ethnic group of the Montagnard people. Young described his treatment:

They brought me breakfast and supper of soup and rice balls. I was given my own private basket of potatoes and manioc. Villagers returning from the fields always made sure the basket was full.... They were gentle farmers. And I began to reexamine my thoughts about the war...realized I knew little about Vietnam or why we were there.... Before this time, I couldn't have given anyone a definition of colonialism.... Neither could I define capitalism. I had my own definition, I guess: "The American Way of Life."

Once in a larger POW camp, he was given books to read about Southeast Asia, many written by Americans, which humanized the local people to Young. Over time he came to feel the war was wrong and agreed to make tapes expressing his protest. He also wrote letters to "president Nixon, to Congress, to GIs, and to people in his hometown."

==== Michael Branch ====
Branch was from Newport, Kentucky where he was described as an "extremely poor country boy". In Vietnam, he drove a truck for the Army, where in May 1968 he was captured while walking on a road in Quảng Trị province. Young said Branch was "as much opposed to the war as I was." In May 1971, Branch signed a statement saying "I've joined with a group of captured servicemen who are against the war in Vietnam." It encouraged other GIs to "refuse combat or just botch up all your operations". In July 1971, he read a statement over the National Liberation Front's Liberation Radio addressed to the American Servicemen in South Vietnam. The statement accused President Nixon of "using captured GI's as an issue to prolong the war." It went on to say that the Provisional Revolutionary Government of South Vietnam had "guaranteed the release of all captured military men and civilians...at the same time as all U.S. and other foreign forces are being withdrawn from South Vietnam." After the war, in 1978, Branch confirmed his antiwar stance and said, "The majority of POW's felt the same way I did but were reluctant to assist us because of possible reprisals at home."

==== Fred Elbert ====
Elbert, who was born on August 9, 1947, came from Brentwood, New York. Daly described him as coming "from a well-to-do family". He enlisted in the Marines in 1966 and was "on a recon mission along the Ho Chi Minh trail" when he was captured on August 16, 1968. The New York Times reported that he was captured "the day after the Marines reported him as absent without leave". According to one of the other prisoners, "he was considered the strangest POW in our entire group." He reportedly made a radio broadcast for the National Liberation Front where he said he had "crossed over to the side of the Liberation Forces."

==== Abel Larry Kavanaugh ====
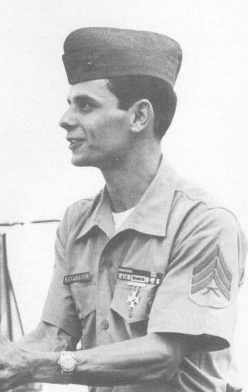
Released POW Sgt Larry Kavanaugh arriving at Clark Air Force Base 1973

Kavanaugh was born on January 13, 1949, and lived in Denver, Colorado with his wife and daughter. He was captured near Phu Bai in South Vietnam in April 1968 "after having been inadvertently left behind" by his unit. He was Chicano and a very religious Catholic. "He insisted that he absolutely opposed the war, that he was opposed to all violence and the taking of life." On June 27, 1973, while back home in Denver with his wife and child, he committed suicide. Young felt that Kavanaugh had done it for the Peace Committee, "what he did was an attempt, I think, to take the pressure from us and put it on the military. He gave his life for us." Kavanaugh's wife Sandra blamed it on the military: "The North Vietnamese kept him alive for five years, and then his own country killed him," she said. "I blame Colonel Guy [the SRO who brought charges against the Peace Committee] and the Pentagon for his death." Six days after his suicide, all the charges were dropped against the other members of the Peace Committee.

== Conclusion ==
Most of the dissenters discussed in the book, including the two officers, were from lower class, modest backgrounds, which was in contrast to the SROs who mostly came from more privileged upbringings and prestigious colleges. The authors analyze these class differences among the POWs and suggest "that the tensions between POWs were rooted in the disparate socioeconomic backgrounds of the antagonists." Most of the dissenters were enlisted men who had "less stake in the outcome of the war than did officers whose military and political careers hinged on the success of their missions". These economic and class differences were also used against the rebels. The authors show how the fact that a number of the "rebels were from poor or broken families" was used to bolster the narrative discussed above that they were maladjusted and of weaker character. And they argue this "was a way to dismiss the authenticity of their political views". The authors also point out that similar discrediting tactics were used against the GI and veteran dissent against the war. Starting in 1972 with a New York Times article headlined "Postwar Shock Besets Ex-GIs" which used inflammatory phrases like "mental health disaster" and "emotional illness", the press began "a steady beat of stories about soldiers home from Vietnam with psychological derangements." Similarly, with the POWs:

The Kavanaugh suicide, fortuitous for the military and political elites wanting to see the war in a rearview mirror, shifted the paradigm from 'bad' to 'mad', form villain to victim, and displaced from social memory the image of warriors, including some POWs, who turned against their war.

== Vietnamese editions ==
Dissenting POWs Vietnamese Cover published by Book Hunter Lyceum

Two Vietnamese translations of this book have been published. On January 9, 2023, Book Hunter Lyceum released Tù Binh Bất Đồng Chính Kiến – Từ Nhà tù Hỏa Lò đến nước Mỹ hôm nay, or Dissent Prisoners – From Hoa Lo Prison to America Today. The other edition was published by Thế Giới Publishers, which translates as The World Publishing House. This is a Vietnamese academic edition of the book with appendices. It is titled Tù binh Mỹ vì hoà bình: Cuộc chiến trong lòng nước Mỹ, or American Prisoners for Peace: The War Within America.

== Reception ==
The book was positively received by a number of reviewers. Lester Andrist, from the University of Maryland, wrote in the International Journal of Comparative Sociology that "Dissenting POW's is an important contribution to the subfields of historical sociology and the sociology of war". He also noted that "the book is clearly written for a general audience, and for this reason, it would make a fantastic addition to an undergraduate course on historical methods or one surveying the Vietnam War." CovertAction Magazine called it a "myth-shattering book" and praised it for restoring "these forgotten POW dissenters to their rightful—and honored—place among the large and diverse Vietnam generation of dissidents, draft resisters, oppositional GIs, veteran activists, deserters, and all those who supported them." John Clarke, in Counterfire calls Dissenting POWs "an important work that is appearing at a time when it is badly needed." Paul Benedikt Glatz, writing for H-Soz-Kult, the German online information and communication platform for historians, said the book "rediscovers the story" of the American POWs in Vietnam. Calling it a "remarkable book" and "an exemplary study of history and memory", he said it "will inspire new directions in research and debate."
