= Fourth Freedom Forum =

American think tank (1982-)

- Founded: 1982
- Founder: Howard S. Brembeck
- Type: Nonpartisan nonprofit providing realistic solutions to today's most urgent global security threats
- Purpose: Global security issues, including counterterrorism, sanctions, and reducing nuclear dangers
- Location: Goshen, Indiana USA
- Region served: Working on five continents
- Method: Research and analytics, dissemination of practical solutions, and coordination of global partners in cooperation to solve challenging security issues
- Website: www.fourthfreedomforum.org

The Fourth Freedom Forum is a nonpartisan, nonprofit operating foundation that seeks to provide discussion, development, and dissemination of ideas focused on solutions to global security threats. Its primary focus is the use of economic incentives and targeted sanctions to establish the rule of law, provide a reliable and humane system of enforcement, and promote international cooperation for the progress of civilized society. The Forum was founded in 1982 by Howard S. Brembeck to advance the idea that economic power, not military power, is the power that rules the world.

== Background ==
The name of the organization comes from President Franklin D. Roosevelt's 1941 Annual Message to Congress as he outlined his vision for Four Freedoms, the four essential freedoms that all people deserve – freedom of speech, freedom of religion, freedom from want, and freedom from fear of war.

== Programs ==
Since the Forum was founded nearly forty years ago, it has earned the trust of governments, international organizations, and experts around the world for policy-relevant research and advice as well as innovative work to encourage regional cooperation around common security goals. The Forum has designed and implemented programs on five continents that have forged partnerships to help governments and civil society organizations to effectively address the most urgent global security threats. The Forum established and provided core support to the Global Center on Cooperative Security and it is now thriving as an independent organization. The Forum also continues to work on international security issues including nonproliferation, sanctions and incentives, and preventing violent extremism.

The Forum and the Kroc Institute for International Peace Studies at the University of Notre Dame formed a partnership to create the Sanctions and Security Research Program that played a key role internationally by recommending the shift from general trade sanctions that can harm civilian populations to the use of more targeted measures (also called smart sanctions). Today smart sanctions are employed with increasing frequency and sophistication by the U.S. as well as by the UN, the European Union, and the African Union

The Forum has also consistently focused on protecting national security without the use of weapons of mass destruction. The Forum collaborates with senior military officers and other experts to stimulate discussions in local communities across the country and have engaged community leaders, policy experts, and ecumenical groups to encourage the U.S. and other governments to reduce reliance on nuclear weapons. The Forum publishes articles, reports, and books assessing the dangers posed by nuclear weapons and offers practical suggestions to reduce or eliminate these dangers.
