= Soldiers in Revolt: GI Resistance During the Vietnam War =

Non-fiction book about soldier & sailor resistance during the Vietnam War

- Author: David Cortright
- Original title: Soldiers in revolt: The American military today
- Genre: Military history
- Publisher: Anchor Press; First Edition (January 1, 1975), Haymarket Books; First Edition (September 1, 2005)
- Pages: 317 Hardcover, 364 Paperback
- ISBN: 0385110839
- Website: https://www.haymarketbooks.org/books/826-soldiers-in-revolt

Soldiers in Revolt: GI Resistance During the Vietnam War was the first comprehensive exploration of the disaffection, resistance, rebellion and organized opposition to the Vietnam War within the ranks of the U.S. Armed Forces. It was the first book written by David Cortright, a Vietnam veteran who is currently Professor Emeritus and special adviser for policy studies at the Keough School of Global Affairs and Kroc Institute for International Peace Studies at the University of Notre Dame, and the author, co-author, editor or co-editor of 22 books. Originally published as the war was ending in 1975, it was republished in 2005 with an introduction by the well known progressive historian Howard Zinn. Despite being first published 51 years ago, it remains the definitive history of this often ignored subject. The book argues persuasively, with encyclopedic rigor, the still under appreciated fact that by the early 1970s the U.S. armed forces, particularly its ground forces, were essentially breaking down; experiencing a deep crises of moral, discipline and combat effectiveness. Cortright reveals, for example, that in fiscal year 1972, there were more conscientious objectors than draftees, and precipitous declines in both officer enrollments and non-officer enlistments. He also documents "staggering level[s]" of desertions, increasing nearly 400% in the United States Army from 1966 to 1971. Perhaps more importantly, Cortright makes a convincing case for this unraveling being both a product and an integral part of the anti-Vietnam War sentiment and movement widespread within U.S. society and worldwide at the time. He documents hundreds of GI antiwar and antimilitary organizations, thousands of individual and group acts of resistance, hundreds of GI underground newspapers, and highlights the role of Black GIs militantly fighting racism and the war. This is where the book stands alone as the first and most systematic study of the antiwar and dissident movements impact and growth within the U.S. armed forces during the Vietnam War. While other books, articles and studies have examined this subject, none have done it as thoroughly and systematically.

== "Quasi mutiny" ==
Banner headline on the front page of the New York Daily News, August 26, 1969

After an initial chapter outlining the break-down within the U.S. military, Cortright examines this collapse more deeply. He describes what happened as a "quasi mutiny"—an armed force just short of full mutiny and insurrection, especially within the ground troops in Vietnam where U.S. military operations became "effectively crippl[ed]". He describes a crisis manifesting itself "in drug abuse, political protest, combat refusals, black militance, and fraggings." He argues this was an army refusing to fight, and calls it an "unofficial troop withdrawal" where soldiers improvised their own methods of avoiding combat. "Search and avoid" missions became commonplace, with troops deploying short distances outside base permitters to hide until returning to report no enemy contact. For page after page he compiles numerous incidents of these and other refusals, including one reported by the New York Daily News on August 26, 1969, under the frontpage headline, "Sir, My Men Refuse to Go!" In this case an entire company of sixty men refused an order to advance. According to military code, refusing orders in combat is mutiny, punishable by death. That none of these men were ever even reprimanded speaks to the general state of the army's disintegration at the time.

Cortright highlights the impact of Black soldiers in these activities, both because in the early days of the war they were disproportionately sent to the front lines, and because many of them became bitter opponents of their treatment and the war itself. He describes Black-led prison rebellions, Black soldiers refusing combat operations and protesting discrimination in field assignments, and the formation of political groups like the Black Liberation Front of the Armed Forces and the Black Brothers Union; all in Vietnam. According to Cortright, the resistance of Black soldiers "was a key factor in crippling U.S. military capabilities in Vietnam."

He was also one of the first scholars to examine in detail what came to be called fragging, the murder or attempted killing of a superior officer or non-com by his own troops. He uses official Army records to report 551 fragging incidents between 1969 and July 1972, but argues this is an obvious under-count as it only included assaults with explosives devices, which failed to include numerous similar deaths by firearms which were more available. He estimates that a full count of assaults against commanders during the war would have "reached into the thousands." He calls this the army's "other war" with "the insurgents in its own ranks" and argues that even the threat of fragging, perhaps by the "unexpected appearance of a grenade pin", could severely hamper a unit's effectiveness. It was "the final manifestation" of military collapse—an army "at war with itself."

== GI movement ==
Cortright then moves on to examine in detail the unprecedented organized political opposition and resistance to the war and the military that both figuratively and literally exploded during this period inside the armed forces. He calls it a phenomenon "never before experienced", and notes that his book will be the first "to seriously examine its development". As a participant himself in antiwar activity within the U.S. Army from 1968 through 1971 at Fort Hamilton and Fort Bliss, he begins with an insider's knowledge—that political activism within the "Draconian legal structure of the military...can be suicidal." Even with this prospect deterring many and disrupting countless attempts, the resistance movements within the U.S. military reached levels during the Vietnam War not seen before or since. Importantly, he documents that it was, in fact, those with combat experience that became the "most militant and committed activists". All of which, of course, amplifies the full dimension "of the military's internal crisis."

=== GI coffeehouses & underground press ===
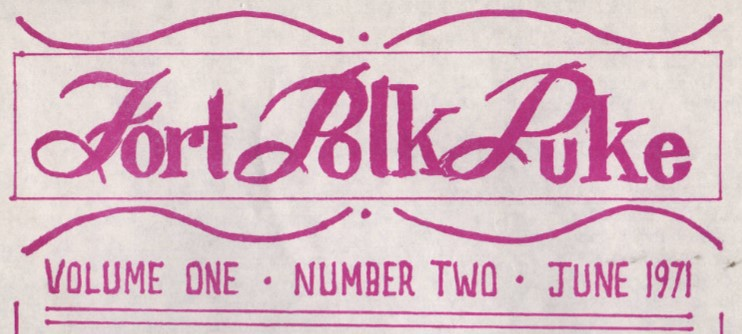
The Fort Polk Puke was one of many GI underground newspapers

He then traces the arc of internal descent starting with the first publicly known incident in November 1965 when Lt. Henry Howe marched in a small peace demonstration in El Paso, TX, earning him two years at hard labor in Fort Leavenworth; through demonstrations and rallies "occurring almost daily at dozens of bases throughout the world" in opposition to the war and massive U.S. bombing campaigns in 1972; to increasing resistance to the oppressions of daily military life ranging from racism and sexism, to the injustice of the military judicial system. Through five chapters he rigorously details the many courageous and crazy ways soldiers and sailors found to resist. We learn about hundreds of underground GI newspapers put out by disgruntled and rebellious GIs, with creative names like Fed Up, Fort Polk Puke, Offul Times, the Hunley Hemorrhoid, Pig Boat Blues, and A'bout Face by Black soldiers in West Germany. No military branch and few major bases or ships were left unaffected. He covers the rise and fall of the GI Coffeehouse movement, describing places like the UFO just outside Fort Jackson in Columbia, SC; the Oleo Strut at Fort Hood in Killen, TX and the Covered Wagon at the Mountain Home Air Force Base in Idaho. Over twenty of these antiwar, counterculture-themed coffeehouse were set-up near military bases, mainly by civilian antiwar activists, to encourage opposition to the war and anti-military sentiment and thousands of GIs took part.

=== Meetings, demonstrations & rallys ===
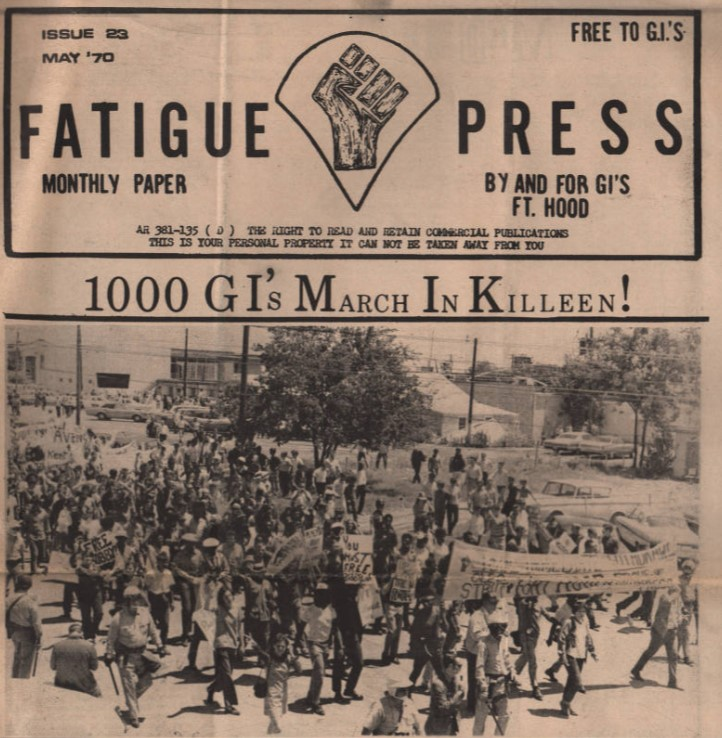
1,000 GIs march outside Fort Hood to protest the Vietnam War and the invasion of Cambodia in May 1970

Cortright documents in detail the many ways GIs found to resist the military and the war at bases all around the world. We learn about the evening of August 23, 1968 when over 100 Black soldiers gathered on Fort Hood to discuss the prevalent racism they experienced in the Army and their opposition to ongoing preparations for their use against civilians at the coming Democratic National Convention in Chicago. Forty-three of them were arrested for sitting down and refusing to follow orders. They became known as the "Fort Hood 43" and their refusal to deploy was one of the largest acts of dissent in U.S. military history. We hear about what Cortright calls "the first effective national GI-movement action" on Armed Forces Day in May 1970. The U.S. had just launched a ground invasion of Cambodia, followed by massive student protests and the killing of four and wounding of nine Kent State students by the National Guard. The result was "an overwhelming GI response." On May 16, demonstrations and protests took place at 17 different bases with hundreds of soldiers joining with thousands of civilians at several of them. At Fort Bragg, several antiwar leaders, including Jane Fonda, spoke to a crowd of 750 soldiers and 3,000 civilians; at Fort Hood, between 700 and 1,000 soldiers marched through the streets; and at Camp Pendleton, Tom Hayden addressed about 200 marines and several thousand civilians. These were unprecedented numbers given the history of punishment for military dissent, and soldiers publicly protesting gave a huge boost to the broader antiwar movement.

=== Stockade & other rebellions ===
Cortright is one of the few scholars to examine the subject of military prison uprisings. He documents rebellions at "nearly every major military stockade" during the war. He shows how the Army's prison population tripled as the war intensified, reaching 7,000 inmates by the end of 1969, most non-white. He argues these numbers directly resulted from opposition to the military and the war. By the Army's own investigation, over 80% of prisoners were charged with going AWOL, and every stockade contained "antiwar, anti-army prisoners" and "determined dissidents." These men were then thrown into broken-down and unsanitary buildings with poor food and medical care, packed into overcrowded facilities, and brutalized by undertrained guards. Here are a few of the many examples he investigated:

- On July 23, 1968, to protest the beating of a Black prisoner, black and white soldiers seized control of the Fort Bragg stockade, holding it for over two days.
- In the summer of 1968 two of the largest prison rebellions of the war took place in Vietnam, both led by Black soldiers. On August 16, at the overcrowded Da Nang Marine brig, a scuffle between guards and inmates escalated into a riot. Prisoners took over the compound for close to two full days. Two weeks later, at the largest military prison in Vietnam, Long Binh, oppressively crowded conditions, compounded by no interior plumbing led hundreds of prisoners to fight MPs for hours, eventually burning many stockade buildings to the ground. Numerous prisoners and MPs were injured and one inmate was killed. Almost 200 Black soldiers then went on a no-work strike while a smaller group barricaded themselves in part of the prison, holding it for more than a month.
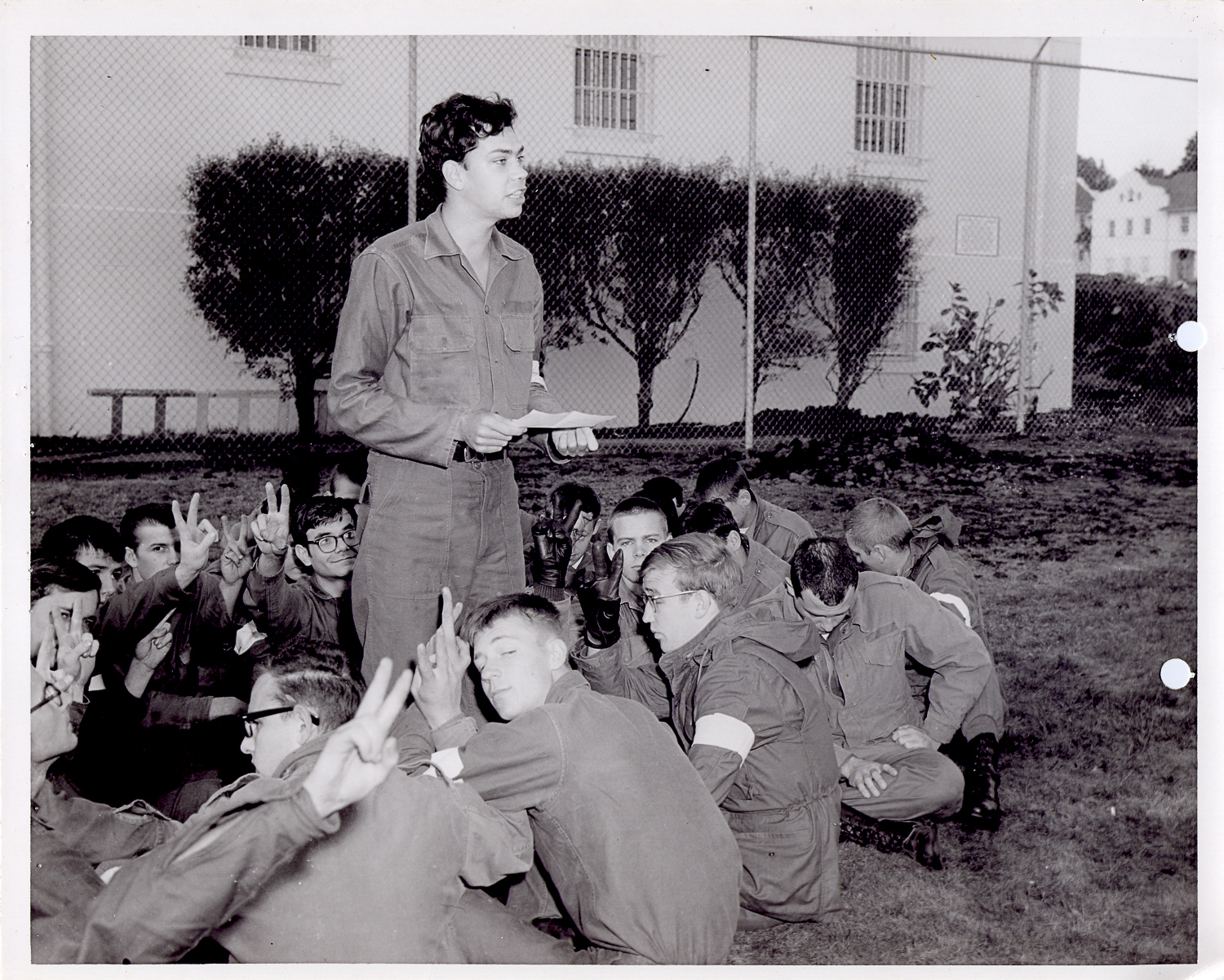
  The Presidio 27 sit-down protest on October 14, 1968.
- The Presidio mutiny, Oct. 14, 1968, 27 prisoners at the Presidio stockade in San Francisco sat down and refused to move in protest of horrible conditions, the murder of a fellow inmate and the war. The protesters were all charged with mutiny, which carries a potential death penalty, drawing international attention.
- At Fort Dix, on June 5, 1969, 150 prisoners, angry about beatings, crowded cells, starvation, being chained to chairs, and an unjust war, took over several buildings. The trials of the Fort Dix 38 became a cause célèbre in the antiwar movement.
- During four months in 1969 there were three major uprisings in the Fort Riley stockade, the last involving more than 200 inmates.
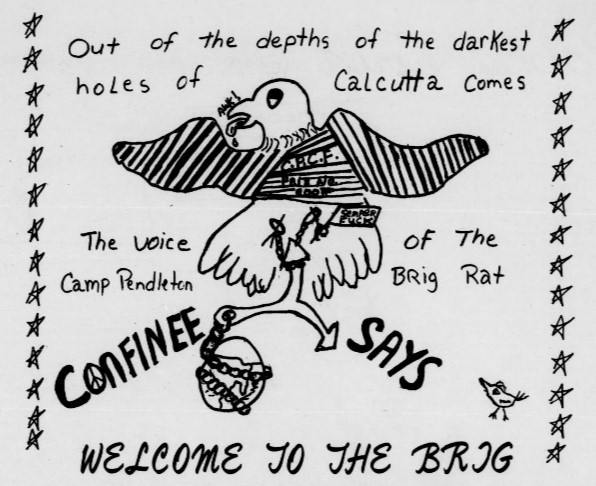
- Masthead of Confinee Says "the voice of the Camp Pendleton brig rat"
  The Camp Pendleton brig is singled out the for special mention, as most oppressive and experiencing more rebellions than any other. Cortright describes a seriously overcrowded space, prisoners often brutalized by guards and frequent brawls. When reporters toured the stockade to investigate rumored problems they weren't allowed to speak with the prisoners. On the night of Sept 14, 1969, a few hours after the press had been given a sanitized tour and sent home, a group of furious inmates burned a supply hut. When MPs moved in on those prisoners, another group of prisoners began smashing furniture in solidarity. As the MPs fired tear gas and attempted to regain control, a third group of prisoners joined the rebellion. By the next morning the entire stockade was in "shambles." The next year, Pendleton prisoners produced one of the few brig underground newspapers—Confinee Says.

These uprisings were not confined to military prisons. Cortright uncovered rebellions at "numerous bases". These were usually described by military authorities as "race riots", however, his research revealed most of them to be anti-authoritarian, similar to the prison rebellions—often pitting "[B]lack enlisted men, and whites as well, against white MPs and NCOs" (Non-commissioned officers).

=== Civilian support groups ===
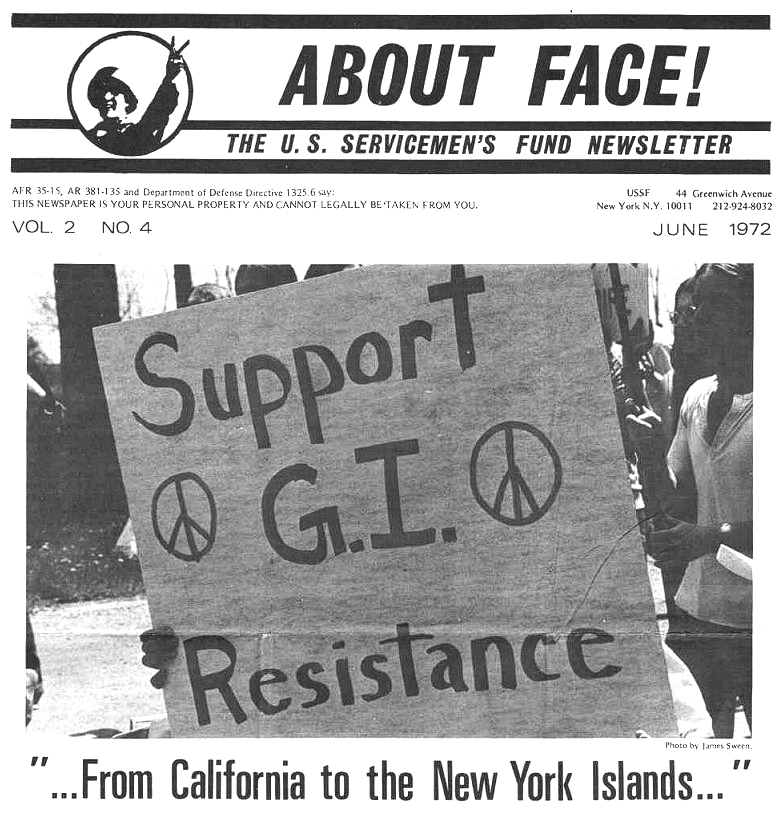
June 1972 cover of the newsletter of the United States Servicemen's Fund

Cortright highlights the importance of civilian support groups to the GI movement. Because soldiers and sailors are under military discipline and control, they were much more vulnerable than the average civilian antiwar activist. Civilian supporters recognized this and often helped individually and built organizations to assist. The GI coffeehouses mentioned above were one of those methods. He also describes the efforts of groups like the Student Mobilization Committee; the Young Socialist Alliance; the GI-Civilian Alliance for Peace; the GI Office; the Chicago Area Military Project, which counseled GIs and created the GI Press Service, a world-wide newsletter for the movement; the Pacific Counseling Service, a GI counseling service organization that provided assistance in the U.S. and Asia; and the United States Servicemen's Fund (USSF), which he describes as the "most important agency for providing material aid to GIs". USSF supported numerous GI coffeehouses as well as dozens of GI underground newspapers in the US and around the world. They provided financial aid, speakers, films and even staff workers.

=== "Over there" ===
This chapter examines the resistance within the Army & Marines outside the U.S., which was particularly intense in Germany where the Army had a garrison force of 190,000 men. This rebelliousness took place despite the fact that political activity was strictly forbidden overseas, that soldiers were often isolated physically and culturally, and that there was little civilian support. These factors were compounded for Black soldiers who found themselves in a "completely white, often racist German population." The most common form resistance took in Europe was desertion. As early as 1966, large numbers of GIs in Germany began deserting and going AWOL, with one Airborne Battalion seeing "a 10-20 percent AWOL rate." By mid-1967 these activities were becoming combined with public political activity, like giving press conferences and forming organizations. Two early GI underground newspapers, RITA Notes (where RITA stands for Resistance Inside the Army) and Act, were written by "self-retired" soldiers in Europe and printed in the tens of thousands. The publications described the experience of and reasons for desertion along with where to go for help. In September 1969, over 100 active duty soldiers, who were against the war and the military justice system, came to a meeting in Grafenwöhr.

==== Black soldiers ====
The most radical and effective activity in Germany was among Black soldiers who formed independent organizations at "nearly every base in the country", with organizations like the Black Action Group, the Black Dissent Group and the Unsatisfied Black Soldiers (USB). USB published an underground newspaper called A'bout Face, whose first issue made its sympathies clear at the top of the first page with, "STOP THE GOD DAM WAR!", and "We want all Black men to be exempt from military service." In the spring of 1970 A'bout Face issued a "Call for Justice" inviting U.S. soldiers from all over Germany to come to the University of Heidelberg on July 4 for a meeting to discuss their grievances. The paper called it a "trial" and charged Uncle Sam with "genocide, mass-murder of millions of people, political murder, economic murder, social murder, and mental murder." The "Call" struck a nerve among U.S. soldiers, especially Black soldiers, as almost a thousand GIs showed up, most of them Black. Cortright says this was "the largest gathering of the GI movement in Europe." A proclamation released at the end of the meeting contained ten demands which were far reaching and testified to the depth of Black GI political consciousness of the times. They ranged from an immediate end to the war, to the withdrawal of "all U.S. interests from African countries", and included several demands related to justice for non-white GIs within the military: improved access to education, hiring more Blacks in civilian jobs connected to the Army, and "equal and adequate housing" for Black GIs.

There were also a number of outright rebellions involving mainly Black GIs in Germany during 1970. Here are three of the many Cortright investigated:

- On March 13, hundreds of prisoners took over the U.S. Army stockade in Mannheim in outrage after a fellow prisoner was beaten to death by guards.
- On September 21, at the Army base in Nellingen, months of racist treatment and harassment led a large group of Black and white GIs to threaten to blow up the base. Base commanders instituted a curfew and mobilized the MPs, but around 9 P.M. about 100 soldiers broke the curfew and "marched through the base shouting 'Revolution' and 'Join Us' to fellow GIs." Cortright argued this was only one of numerous examples of Black and white GIs acting together that refuted the inaccurate attempts by military commanders to blame this and similar incidents on racial divisions. His research shows the grievances "go much deeper, with white enlisted men often sharing the same bitterness and outrage" as their fellow Black GIs.
- On December 22, nearly two hundred soldiers with the 36th Infantry at the Ayers Kaserne base in Kirch-Göns went on a "violent rampage" setting off simulated artillery, attacking an officer and smashing windows at the officer's club.

==== Germany ====
Banner headline in the Overseas Weekly April 11, 1971

According to Cortright's research, the U.S. Army experienced "more internal turmoil in Germany" than anywhere other than Vietnam. By early 1971, the numbers of GIs active in the political movement "had grown to massive proportions." There were dozens of organizations, and numerous underground newspapers were being produced at various bases. The April 11, 1971 issue of the English-language Overseas Weekly summarized this fact with the two-page headline, "GIs Declare War on the Army" (see image). The accompanying article described numerous incidents like one at the 78th Engineers Battalion in Karlsruhe where 20 Black and white GIs burned the battalion headquarters and damaged 23 trucks using Molotov cocktails and a pickax. In March that year, about 700 (more than 50%) of the soldiers at Camp Pieri in Wiesbaden signed a petition "protesting discrimination, excessive harassment, and intolerable living conditions". Several hundred GI also gathered at the base gym cheering a call for a mass strike. In mid-1971, another incident occurred at the 93rd Signal Battalion in Darmstadt that received significant press coverage internationally. In response to a Black soldier's unjust arrest, 53 Black GIs attempted to meet with the battalion commander to demand justice. Instead, they were confronted with "bayonet-wielding riot troops" who hauled them off to the brig. As the news spread, civil rights groups got involved, including the ACLU and the NAACP, and the antiwar movement began to take up the case of the "Darmstadt 53". The army ended up dropping the charges like a hot potato and freeing all involved.

==== Pacific Theater ====
The GI movement among Army and Marine soldiers in the Pacific never reached the levels achieved in the U.S. or Germany. U.S. military bases in the Pacific are spread out over thousands of miles, mainly in Hawaii, Japan, Korea, Okinawa and the Philippines. And yet, Cortright documents "considerable political activity". The first known protest began in Hawaii in August 1969, when an airman named Louis Buff Parry took refuge in a church in Honolulu calling on fellow GIs to strike against the military. He was soon joined by 33 other GIs, creating the largest sanctuary of the GI movement which lasted 38 days until they were all arrested by MPs. There were also dozens of incidents of rebellions by Black soldiers fighting discrimination and racism, including 50 Black Marines at the Kaneohe Marine base who stood up and raised their fists in the Black power salute during the evening flag-lowering ceremony on August 10, 1969, resulting in a four-hour brawl among 250 Marines. And, also in August that year, several hundred Black soldiers attacked MPs and military-intelligence agents near the Camp Hansen base in Okinawa. Perhaps the largest demonstration was on January 15, 1971, Martin Luther King's birthday, when about 600 Black soldiers from the 2nd Infantry Division convened at a recreation hall near the Korean DMZ. The most active base in Asia was the large U.S. Marine facility at Iwakuni, Japan, which was the major staging area for Marine Aircraft Groups rotating in and out of Vietnam. Two Marines started Semper Fi there in January 1970, and it became the longest running GI underground newspaper, lasting until August 1978, with 178 known issues. An important part of this success was the support of the Japanese antiwar organization Beheiren. According to Cortright, when "Marines at Iwakuni began organizing from within...Japanese civilians quickly came to their aid." He also cited a Japanese press report that Semper Fi had "350 active supporters at the base" in 1970.

=== Resisting the air war ===
In the early 1970s, the U.S. was forced to began a gradual shift of U.S. combat operations in Southeast Asia from the ground to the air. As the ground war stalemated and Army grunts increasingly refused to fight or resisted the war in various other ways, the U.S. turned increasingly to the air. By 1972 there were twice as many aircraft carriers off the coast of Vietnam as before, accompanied by a massive expansion of bombing and the mining of Vietnamese ports. Cortright describes this policy shift as an "Orwellian nightmare" of "low-profile, automated bombardment" and "specialized warfare". It was an attempt by the Nixon administration to make the war "less objectionable" with the aim of lulling people into acceptance. These changes did significantly reduce the GI resistance and antiwar activity around the Army and its bases, but instead of reducing opposition, it shifted it as the antiwar movement, which was at its height in the U.S. and worldwide, became a significant factor in and around the Navy and Air Force, stirring up substantial new difficulties for the military.

==== "Seasick Sailors" ====
There were early acts of resistance within the Navy, like:

Logo of Duck Power, official organ of GI's Against Fascism

- The Intrepid Four, who deserted from the aircraft carrier USS Intrepid in late 1967;
- OM: The Servicemen's Newsletter, an underground newspaper produced in the Pentagon by a sailor starting in April 1969, and
- GI's Against Fascism which formed in mid-1969, becoming the first organized resistance group in the Navy. They began by protesting "intolerable" living conditions, but formulated a more generalized opposition to the war and to institutional racism, which they exposed in their underground newspaper Duck Power.
- In late 1969 GI's Against Fascism merged with a group of marines at Camp Pendleton to form the Movement for a Democratic Military (MDM), which rapidly spread to a number of other bases in California and the Midwest. MDM was heavily influenced by the Black Panther Party and the Black militancy of the times and became one of the more radical GI organizations of the era. In one example of their influence, the chapter at the Great Lakes Naval Training Center responded to the illegal arrest of four Black WAVES by mobilizing over 100 sailors to surround the building where they were being held. After a night of increasing resistance, including several acts of sabotage causing "some ten thousand dollars property damage", the women were released.

==== Officers get organized ====
But, it wasn't until late 1970 and early 1971 that internal opposition accelerated in response to the increasing role of the Navy in the war. In one indication of how deep the antiwar sentiment was becoming in the military, the Concerned Officers Movement (COM) was started in Washington, DC in the spring of 1970 by junior officers, mainly from the Navy. They published a journal called COMmon Sense and rapidly expanded throughout all branches and many bases of the U.S. military, soon claiming "some three thousand members in more than twenty local chapters." In early 1971 they created quite a stir by holding press conferences on both coasts calling for an investigation into the military's top brass for possible war crimes, specifically naming Generals William Westmoreland and Creighton Abrams, and Admiral Elmo Zumwalt. Probably the most active COM chapter was formed by Naval officers in San Diego, the principal homeport of the Pacific Fleet, where they soon changed their name to Concerned Military as they expanded to include enlisted men and women. Working with other antiwar activists in the city they started a campaign to stop the aircraft carrier USS Constellation from returning to Vietnam, which grew into a citywide effort involving hundreds of sailors and civilians and influencing tens of thousands. They even held an unofficial vote gathering 54,000 ballots with 82% of the civilians and 73% of the GIs voting for the aircraft carrier to stay home. When the ship set sail for Vietnam in on October 1, 1971, nine sailors publicly refused to go, seeking sanctuary in a local church.

==== Stop our ship ====
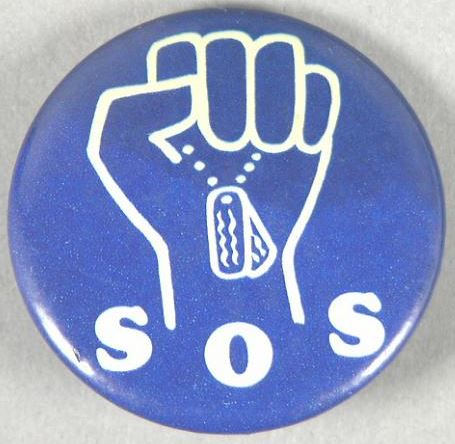
The SOS (Stop Our Ship) button.

These efforts sparked a larger fleet-wide campaign which became known as the Stop Our Ship movement. Taking inspiration from the efforts around the Constellation, twelve sailors met on board the aircraft carrier USS Coral Sea in September 1971 and "decided to initiate a similar SOS movement aboard their own ship." They began circulating an antiwar petition, which was rapidly gathering signatures until it was confiscated by the ship's executive officer. Undaunted the sailors reprinted and recirculated the petition gaining about 1,200 signatures—a quarter of the ship's crew. The carrier was ported in the San Francisco Bay Area, and as the news spread about these activities on the carrier, large numbers of civilian activists began to support the antiwar sailors. On two separated days in November, over 1,000 demonstrators gathered at the main gate of the Alameda Naval Station to show support. When the ship sailed, 35 sailors refused to go. The Coral Sea's troubles didn't stop there, when it arrived in Honolulu, about fifty crewmembers met with the cast of the FTA Show, the antiwar road show led by Jane Fonda, and several hundred attended the sold-out show. When the ship left Honolulu en route to Vietnam, another 53 sailors were missing.

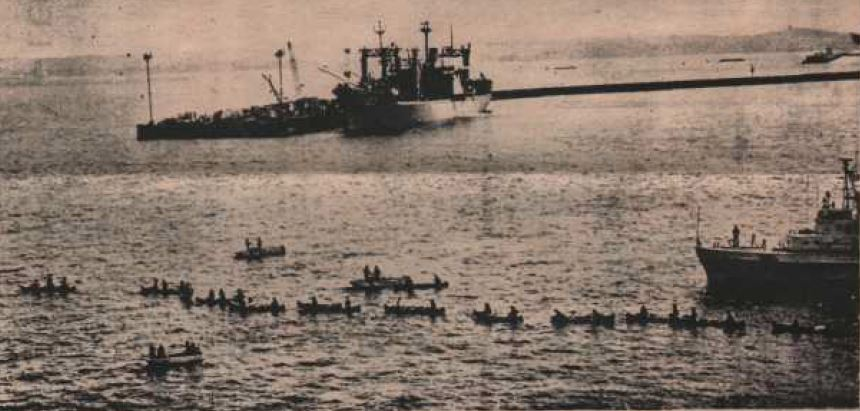
Canoes and small boats attempting to blockade the USS Nitro as it departed for Vietnam.

Soon similar movements were taking place on board numerous other ships, including the USS Kitty Hawk, the USS Enterprise, the first nuclear-powered aircraft carrier, the USS Midway, the USS Ticonderoga, the USS America and the USS Oriskany. One of the most dramatic protests took place as the USS Nitro, a munitions ship loaded with armament at the Naval Weapons Station Earle in New Jersey started to leave port on April 24, 1972. As it pulled out into the harbor, it was greeted by an antiwar blockade of seventeen canoes and small boats. The Coast Guard attempted to disperse the demonstrators, however, they were first confronted by dissent from within their ranks, and then, one of the Nitro's crew on the "ship’s deck suddenly stood up on the rail, raised the clenched-fist salute, and literally jumped overboard!" He was quickly followed by six more crew members, including one non-swimmer who had donned a life jacket.

==== Black uprisings ====
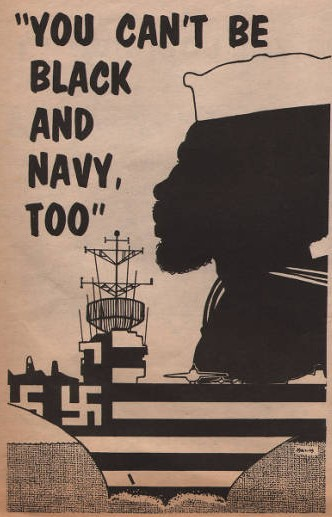
"You Can't Be Black And Navy Too" reversed the Navy's recruitment slogan: "You can be Black and Navy Too." From The Veteran 1972

Bluntly calling the Navy "traditionally...the most racist branch of the armed forces," Cortright reviews its history of confining Black sailors to the "most menial positions" and of using Filipinos as cooks and officer's servants. The last of the military branches to integrate, it was forced due to serious manpower shortages in late 1971 to significantly increase its minority recruitment. Promised skills and training, Black sailors instead found themselves, as described by the House Armed Services Committee, "mess cooking...compartment cleaning and chipping paint." The New York Times quoted a sailor on the USS Kitty Hawk saying they had been “treated like dogs.” These degrading experiences combined with growing antiwar sentiment and a "massive expansion of bombing" and mining in April 1972 led to "a startling series" of Black rebellions. Two of the most significant were on the USS Kitty Hawk and the USS Constellation.

===== The Kitty Hawk Riot =====
In October the USS Kitty Hawk pulled into Subic Bay in the Philippians en route home after "a grueling eight months at sea". Instead they were ordered back into combat. On October 11, the night before the ship was to depart, a fight between Black and white sailors erupted in the Enlisted Men's club which was broken up by a marine riot squad. Five Black and four white sailors were arrested but returned to the ship before it departed. Back at sea, unhappy about being redeployed and overworked, many of the crew were now also deeply angry over racial tensions.

Once underway on October 12, an investigating officer began an inquiry into the fight by summoning several Black sailors and none of the whites involved, exacerbating "still smoldering tensions". Soon over 100 angry Black sailors gathered on the mess deck for a discussion. The chief master-at-arms summoned the ship's Marine guards, and an explosive situation quickly developed as fights broke out. "The fighting spread rapidly, with bands of Blacks and whites marauding throughout the ship’s decks and attacking each other with fists, chains, wrenches, and pipes." Numerous conflicting orders were issued by different officers resulting in more confusion and fights raged on for much of the night, leaving 40 white and 6 Black sailors injured. When arrests were made for the fighting, all of the 25 arrested were Black.

===== Mutiny on the Constellation =====
As word spread in the fleet about the incidents on board the Kitty Hawk, many of the Black sailors on the Constellation were sympathetic with their arrested brothers. In late October 1972, with the ship undergoing training exercises off the coast of Southern California, Black crewmembers formed an organization called the “Black Fraction,” "with the aim of protecting minority interests in promotion policies and in the administration of military justice." The ship's command responded by identifying "fifteen members of Black Faction as agitators" and giving six of them immediate less-than-honorable discharges. At the same time, notice was given ship wide that 250 men would be administratively discharged. Feeling they were being singled out for retaliation for their activism and fearing that most of the additional discharges would be directed at them, over one hundred sailors, including several whites, staged a sit-in on the morning of November 3. They continued their sit-in, refusing to work, for over 24 hours forcing the captain, in consultation with others all the way up to the Chief of Naval Operations in Washington, to cut sea operations short and take the dissidents ashore. Once docked, 144 crew members left the ship, including 8 whites. The ship returned to sea but returned a few days later to pick up the mutinous sailors. Most of the men, however, refused to board the ship and on November 9 "staged a defiant dockside strike - perhaps the largest act of mass defiance in naval history." Despite these unprecedented actions, none of the sailors were arrested, most were simply reassigned to other duty stations, while a few received minor punishments.

==== Sabotage ====
Internal sabotage was much more frequent during the Vietnam War than during other wars and conflicts. Cortright argues these "covert acts of disruption" were one method for GIs to express their "bitterness" at the military and the war. He examines numerous examples, like:

- On May 26, 1970, the USS Anderson was prevented from departing San Diego harbor when nuts, bolts and chains were dropped into the main gear shaft.
- In July 1972, a massive fire broke out on the USS Forrestal aircraft carrier in Norfolk causing over $7 million in damage in "the largest single act of sabotage in naval history", which delayed the ships deployment for over two months.
- A paint scraper and bolts were put into an engine's reduction gears on the aircraft carrier USS Ranger in Alameda, California causing a million dollars in damage and more than three month's delay. During the trial of the accused sailor, who was eventually cleared, it came out the ship had experienced "over two dozen instances" of sabotage during just two months of 1972.
- By the Navy's own statistics, during fiscal year 1971 there were 488 investigated incidents, "including 191 for sabotage, 135 for arson, and 162 for 'wrongful destruction'".
- A Congressional investigation also revealed that the above mentioned redeployment of the USS Kitty Hawk to Vietnam, which led to the riot, was apparently caused by sabotage aboard two other carriers.

All of this caused the House Armed Services Committee to declare in January 1973:

Recent instances of sabotage, riot, willful disobedience of orders, and contempt for authority, instances which have occurred with increased frequency, are clear-cut symptoms of a dangerous deterioration of discipline.

==== "Airmancipation" ====
Even within the US Air Force, where few airmen are "ever actually embroiled in combat operations", the GI movement emerged and grew as the air war intensified. According to Cortright's research, resistance within the Air Force "came to be a major restraint on American bombardment in Indochina".

Some of the earliest activity occurred in 1969 and early 1970:

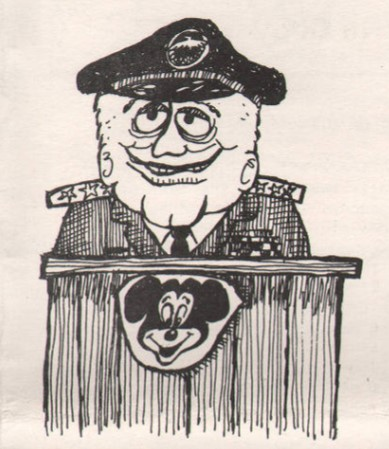
The Mickey Mouse General—A Four-Year Bummer Cover Oct-Nov 1969

- The United Servicemen's Action for Freedom began organizing at Wright-Patterson AFB in Ohio.
- GIs United Against the War began at Grissom AFB in Indiana, where they published Aerospaced.
- GIs at Chanute AFB in Illinois opened the first underground coffeehouse for airmen called the Red Herring and published Harass the Brass, which later became A Four Year Bummer. With students from the University of Illinois they staged a "trial of the military" on Armed Forces Day in 1970, attended by several hundred students and airmen.

The first larger political organizing by airmen occurred in England where there were eight U.S. Air Force bases and 22,000 GIs. With support from British antiwar civilians, airmen founded the newspaper and organization called People Emerging Against Corrupt Establishments (P.E.A.C.E.). On May 31, 1971, about 300 airmen convened in London's Hyde Park to present an antiwar petition, signed by over 1,000 active-duty GIs, to the U.S. Embassy.

Closer to the war, airmen at Misawa AFB in Japan created an organization they called Hair (Human Activities in Retrospect). With support from Beheiren they opened a GI coffeehouse called the Owl. Airmen at Yokota AFB near Tokoyo produced a newspaper called First Amendment and organized a rock and peace festival on July 18, 1971, which was attended by over 200 GIs. At Clark AFB in the Philippines, a major staging area for the air war, GIs produced two different underground newspapers at different times, The Whig and Cry Out.

As in the other branches, Black airmen faced racism and the worst conditions and were the most radical. Even the Air Force Times had to take note, reporting in late 1970 that there were at least 25 Black culture groups fighting "against discrimination and repression." One of these was the Black Discussion Group at Plattsburg AFB in New York, and another was the Concerned Black Airmen (CBA) at Chanute AFB, where they held a memorial service for Malcolm X on Armed Forces Day in 1971. The CBA campaigned for months to improve their situation on the base, but received "little cooperation". After months of appeals and frustration, Black airmen attacked the base exchange, theater and gas station, leaving them seriously damaged. The largest incident of violent rebellion, and "the largest mass rebellion in the history of the Air Force", occurred in May 1971 at Travis AFB, a transfer hub for troops to and from the war. As in numerous other similar incidents, it began with a conflict at the enlisted club on base. The fighting started on a Saturday between Black airmen (and women) and MPs and continued intermittently through the weekend, with some Black GIs arrested. Monday evening, over 200 Black (and some white) airmen attempted to free those arrested, only to be confronted by 300 MPs and nearly 80 civilian police from the nearby area. Cortright describes an expanding battle that continued until the next day, involving up to 600 airmen, with an officers club "burned to the ground", several dozen injuries, and 135 GIs arrested, most of them Black.

==== Unreliable air power ====
By 1972, the shift of U.S. combat operations from the ground to the air had profoundly shifted the GI movement from the Army and Marines to the Navy and Air Force. Cortright says that by the first half of that year, "the number of organizing projects" within the latter surpassed those in the former. As he puts it, "At each new escalation of the bombing in Vietnam, airmen responded with a clamor of protest." The massive Easter bombing offensive in 1972 unleashed the "most intensive wave of protests, with demonstrations and rallies occurring almost daily at dozens of bases throughout the world." Even the pilots and crews of B-52 heavy bombers were resisting the war in growing numbers. Cortright cites the Washington Post reporting on "an increasing moral problem among B-52 bomber crews", and suspects this "played a major role in the decision to limit flights". Even as the war was winding down, the Pentagon was unable to count on its highly trained pilots and air-crews. Just as in the Navy's Seventh Fleet, as in the Army and Marines before them, the GIs were increasingly refusing to fight.

=== Shifting priorities ===
With the signing of the Paris Peace Accords in January 1973, the GI movement declined rapidly, with remaining groups and issues shifting political emphasis more towards fighting repression, racism and grievances with the military justice system. At a number of military bases non-white GIs formed organizations to fight discrimination. For example, the Black Servicemen's Caucus, which was founded by sailors in the Long Beach Naval Station and Naval Shipyard in late 1971 or 1972, supported the Black sailors involved in the rebellions on the Kitty Hawk and Constellation. The group expanded to Orange County, California and New Orleans. There was also a group called the Tidewater Africans in Norfolk, Virginia, the location of numerous East Coast Naval installations.

=== Consequences and implications ===
In Part II, Cortright examines the changes the U.S. Armed Forces found necessary as a result of the combined impact of the defeat in Vietnam, the significant internal dissent, and changed societal attitudes toward the military. He predicts the need for adjustments will intensify. The first change, which was caused as much by technological advances as political necessity, was the shift towards relying less on ground troops and more on mechanized and electronic warfare methods. This is often characterized as "firepower, not manpower", and also referred to as the "electronic battlefield". These changes have been combined with the increasing use of "mercenary armies". He sums up these changes saying the military now concentrates on "technology and machine-delivered firepower", while relying increasingly on mercenaries for the ground operations.

He also addresses the decision to increase the numbers of women in the military. He points out this was driven, as much as anything, by the shortages of male enlistees, and documents the "serious discrimination" women face in the ranks. This is tied closely with "the sexism of military life"—women "are being recruited not to serve equally" but to "free men for more important military jobs." More, he argues, because "the attitude of assertive male superiority...is an essential element of military culture", it is fostered in training practices. Training "equate[s] masculinity with belligerence" and encourages male-dominant relations, with those who fall below standards "branded 'pussy' or 'queer' and those who are suitably warlike designated 'men.'" He correctly predicts future struggles in the military caused by women finding "themselves in oppressive circumstances".

Cortright examines the implications of the all volunteer military, with resulting vast increases in military expenses and, what he calls, the "recruitment racket" it requires. He documents how the creation of the all volunteer military created the need for "an immense recruitment apparatus", expanding a system already "notorious for its lack of honesty." He bursts the myth of learning a trade in the military by citing numerous studies showing that it "cannot provide worthwhile occupational training." This compounds the difficulties faced by non-white troops, particularly Black GIs, who may be attracted to the military with the expectation of improving their lives, but often experience "prejudices more severe" than outside the military, and then receive little if any training useful post-military.

In Chapter 12, he addresses what he admits is "a difficult issue" that "diverts attention" from the more important question posed by a military whose mission is essentially global intervention. Nonetheless, he makes suggestions for a more democratic military. In this he echoes the voice of the resisting GIs he has already presented in his book, arguing they "have clamored for greater freedom and dignity". He argues for:

- A completely revised Uniform Code of Military Justice;
- democratizing of military courts;
- abolition of the current system of non-judicial punishment;
- abolition of the military cast system, especially between officers and the enlisted ranks;
- and the transformation of the administrative-discharge system which leads to hundreds of thousands of less-than-honorable discharges.

== Conclusion ==
As surprising as it might seem for a book first published 51 years ago, Soldiers in Revolt is still the definitive book on the opposition and resistance to the Vietnam War within the ranks of the U.S. military. Further, because the book makes the convincing case that the U.S. military "ceased to function as an effective fighting force", it stands as a strong argument against the thesis that it fought the Vietnam War with its "hands tied", as some have argued. Cortright argues persuasively that it was, in fact, the internal collapse of the effectiveness of the ground troops in Vietnam that prompted their rapid withdrawal in 1971 and 1972, only to be replaced by a massive air war that, in turn, confronted new waves of resistance.

Other scholars have come to some of the same conclusion as Cortright, as have two Army commissioned studies, but none as thoroughly. In 1971, Colonel Robert Heinl published an article in the Armed Forces Journal called The Collapse of the Armed Forces. He declared the army in Vietnam was "dispirited where not near mutinous." In 1970 and 1971, the Research Analysis Corporation, a Virginia-based think tank hired by the Army, surveyed a large cross-section of soldiers. These studies were not available when Soldiers in Revolt was first written, but were discussed by Cortright in his Postscript to the 2005 edition. He commented they provided "remarkable insight into the startling dimensions of GI resistance". More, they depict a "movement even more widespread than those of us involved at the time thought possible." These studies found that "47 percent of low-ranking soldiers engag[ed] in some form of dissent or disobedience". Plus, if drug use is considered another form of resistance, the number jumped up to 55 percent—more than half of the soldiers were finding ways to disengage from and resist the military. Cortright calls this "a truly remarkable and unprecedented level of disaffection."

In 2003, former Army Captain Shelby Stanton published The Rise and Fall of an American Army: U.S. Ground Forces in Vietnam, 1963-1973. This study draws "from official military unit archives", which confirmed that "the entire ground combat strength of the U.S. military was fully committed during the peak years of the war," to the point where military resources remaining in the U.S. were "completely exhausted." And yet, he corroborates the collapse of morale and discipline and shows that "combat disobedience" was indeed widespread, resulting "in disintegrating unit cohesion and operational slippages....an excessive number of 'accidental' shootings and promiscuous throwing of grenades, some of which were deliberate fraggings aimed at unpopular officers, sergeants, and fellow enlisted men."

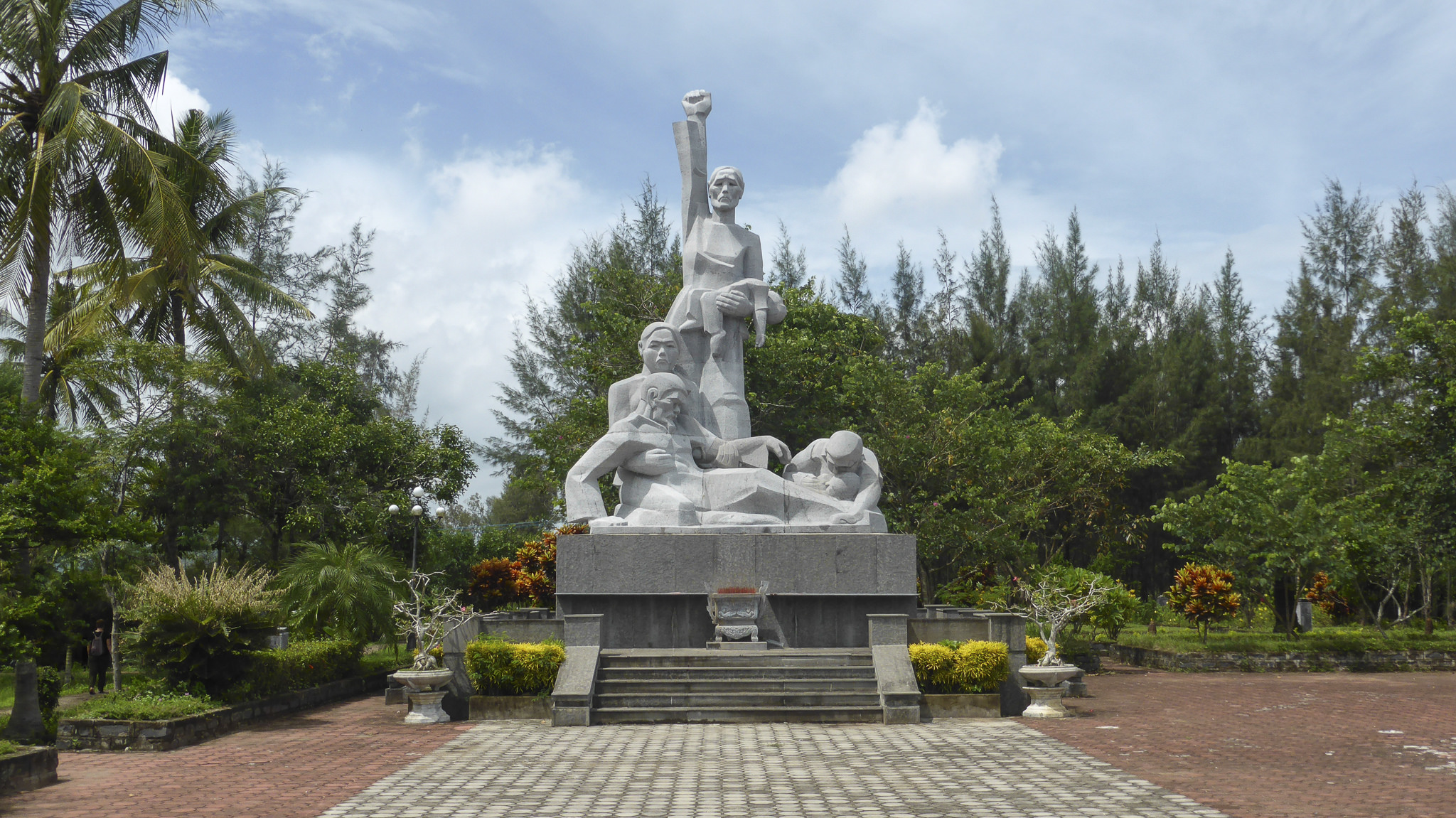
Monument of the My Lai Massacre in Sơn Mỹ, Vietnam portrays both the tremendous suffering and heroic resistance of the Vietnamese people

Cortright also analyses the why in a way none of these others have done. Why did the American GIs turn against the war in such numbers? The fact was, the U.S. military was defeated on the battlefield, and the GIs understood this more than anyone. As mentioned above, Cortright provides convincing evidence that it was the soldiers "with direct combat experience" who were the most committed antiwar activists. They witnessed first hand, both the atrocities, like the Mỹ Lai massacre, and the heroism of the Vietnamese people. The "Vietnamese had the advantage," their "soldiers were fighting on their own homeland to rid their country of a foreign invader." "[A]n army needs more than men and machines", says Cortright. The Vietnamese fighting forces had the support of the vast majority of the citizens. The corrupt, artificially created regime in South Vietnam "never had legitimacy or popular support", and the U.S. army was thousands of miles from home—the invader. While the American GIs found themselves outmaneuvered and outsmarted by forces that would attack and then melt into familiar jungles and underground tunnels, clearly supported by the population, the Vietnamese knew the "American people were divided by the war". These "doubts developed among [U.S.] soldiers as well", strengthened by what they witnessed in the war, undermining their motivation and will to fight. Cortright also points to the "nature of military service itself", with countless examples of defiance and resistance to the "oppressive conditions of enlisted duty", especially racial discrimination.

Cortright's final point, what he calls the "central lesson of the GI movement...is that people need not be helpless before the power of illegitimate authority, that by getting together and acting upon their convictions people can change society and, in effect, make their own history."

== Reception ==
Soldiers in Revolt received consistently favorable reviews. Kevin Buckley, who was himself a reporter in Vietnam during the war, reviewing for The New York Review of Books, called it an "exhaustive account" and "a careful inquiry", and agreed that the "growing dissent among GIs...was one of the main reasons why US forces withdrew from Vietnam." Greg Gaut, with In These Times, called it "perhaps the most important forgotten book about the Vietnam War." Harriet Van Horn, writing in the York Daily Record, commented that she was "unaware of the vigor and depth of GI discontent" until she read Cortright's book. Brian Clark, in The Sacramento Bee, felt the book "a well-researched report" that did "an excellent job of documenting the GI movement." The Fort Worth Star-Telegram reporter Spencer Tucker, called the book "an impressive catalog" of military unrest. The Havre Daily News reviewer Mary Antunes, called it "an objective account" of the "deterioration in military morale and discipline."

== See also ==
- A Matter of Conscience
- F.T.A. - documentary film about the FTA Show
- Fort Hood Three
- Intrepid Four
- Opposition to United States involvement in the Vietnam War
- Sir! No Sir!, a documentary about the antiwar movement within the ranks of the United States Armed Forces
- The Spitting Image, a 1998 book by Vietnam veteran and sociology professor Jerry Lembcke which disproves the widely believed narrative that American soldiers were spat upon and insulted by antiwar protesters
- USS Sumter Three
- Veterans For Peace
- Vietnam Veterans Against the War
- Waging Peace in Vietnam
- Winter Soldier Investigation
