= F.T.A. =

Documentary about the 1971 anti-Vietnam War FTA Show

- Film poster
- Directed by: Francine Parker
- Written by: Michael Alaimo; Len Chandler; Pamela Donegan; Jane Fonda; Donald Sutherland; Nancy Dowd; Rita Martinson; Robin Menken; Holly Near; Dalton Trumbo (book) Johnny Got His Gun
- Produced by: Francine Parker; Jane Fonda; Donald Sutherland
- Starring: Jane Fonda; Donald Sutherland; Michael Alaimo; Len Chandler; Pamela Donegan; Rita Martinson; Paul Mooney; Holly Near; Peter Boyle
- Cinematography: Eric Saarinen; Juliana Wang; Joan Weidman
- Edited by: Michael Beaudry; Joel Moorwood; Judy Reidel
- Music by: Homer Swan; Aminadav Aloni; Yale Zimmerman
- Distributed by: American International Pictures
- Release date: 1972
- Running time: 96 minutes
- Country: United States
- Language: English

F.T.A. is a 1972 American documentary film starring Jane Fonda and Donald Sutherland and directed by Francine Parker, which follows a 1971 anti-Vietnam War road show for G.I.s, the FTA Show, as it stops in Hawaii, The Philippines, Okinawa, and Japan. It includes highlights from the show, behind the scenes footage, local performers from the countries visited, and interviews and conversations with GIs "as they discuss what they saw in battle, their anger with the military bureaucracy, and their opposition to America's presence in Indochina." Called by Fonda "a spit and a prayer production" it was far from a big budget Hollywood movie, or even a well-funded documentary. While the movie "is raw," it "underscores how infectious the movement of the 60s and 70s was", and chronicles both the Tour itself as well as the soldiers who came to see it and "the local talent of organizers, labor unions and artist/activists" in the countries visited.

== The FTA Show ==
The FTA Show, the overseas part of which the film documents, was created as a response to Bob Hope's patriotic and pro-war USO tour.

The Bob Hope show was becoming less and less of a hit with G.I.s and by 1970 both The New York Times and The Washington Post were taking note of U.S. troop "disillusionment with Hope's humor and prowar message". Fonda told reporters that the FTA Show was inspired by "articles in the Washington Post and The New York Times about soldiers in Vietnam who were dissatisfied with the typical USO shows." She told a reporter from the NY Times that the show would reinforce "what the soldiers already know. They know that the war is insane. They know what GIs have to contend with better than we do. We're simply saying, 'We know what you're up against and we support you.'"

The FTA Show's official statement of purpose was:

The G.I. movement exists on nearly every United States military installation around the world. It is made up of American servicemen and women who have come to realize that if there is to be an end to the U.S. military involvement in South East Asia — an end to the war — it is they who must end it.

In response to the invitation of servicemen and women within the G.I. movement we have formed the F.T.A. Show in order to support their fight to end discrimination against people because of race, sex, class, religion and personal or political belief.

The F.T.A. Show

The show first travelled around the continental U.S. performing for soldiers, sailors and marines at various military bases, including Fort Bragg, Fort Ord and the naval and marines bases in San Diego before departing for Hawaii and Asian U.S. bases

== The film ==
The documentary begins with a message in white letters against a black screen which states that it "was made in association with the servicewomen and men stationed on the United States bases of the Pacific Rim". The filmmakers want the viewer to know the film, and tour it documents, were done with GIs and they want the viewer to see the tour from a GIs point of view. The opening message then states the film is also done with the GIs friends "whose lands they presently occupy." So, even more unusually, the filmmakers want the viewer to watch from the perspective of the people in the countries occupied by U.S. military bases. As the film unfolds we see both the FTA Tour itself and we see interviews with GIs and we see footage and interviews with their "friends", the local people in the countries visited. One author described this later element of the film as "explicit solidarity with the fight for economic and political rights by the ordinary peoples of the lands it visits."

For example, there is a sequence in Olongapo City, Philippines where the U.S. Naval Base at Subic Bay was located. There is footage of Filipino pro-democracy demonstrators "protesting against the U.S. government's desire to keep the Philippines in a perpetually 'semi-feudal' state. One demonstrator explicitly acknowledges a natural 'identity of interests' between Filipinos and the American GI against American imperialism." These demonstration scenes are interspersed with a "vaudeville skit on the FTA stage in which Jane Fonda and Holly Near dance à la Folies Bergère to the tune of Bomb Another City Today!

=== G.I.s speak out ===
To help the viewer understand the perspective of rank-and-file soldiers, the filmmakers interview active-duty G.I.s. The film only focuses about half its time on the tour itself, while the rest is taken up with GI interviews and footage of local people and events. A marine is shown explaining that he is against the war and talking about writing home to tell his mother. "How can you write your mother and tell her?" he asks, but when he decides to do it he is pleasantly surprised to hear that "she fully understood and she was happy that I felt that way". A black G.I. complains that things are tough at home and asks, "So why should we go over there and put our lives down?" Then a woman in the Air Force describes why she enlisted right after high school: with no job and no money, "the Air Force came along and there I was." Several black marines are also shown talking about the racism in the military and at home and about "their reluctance to fight in Vietnam that arises from their sense of commonality with the Vietnamese as oppressed nonwhite peoples."

=== The FTA Song ===
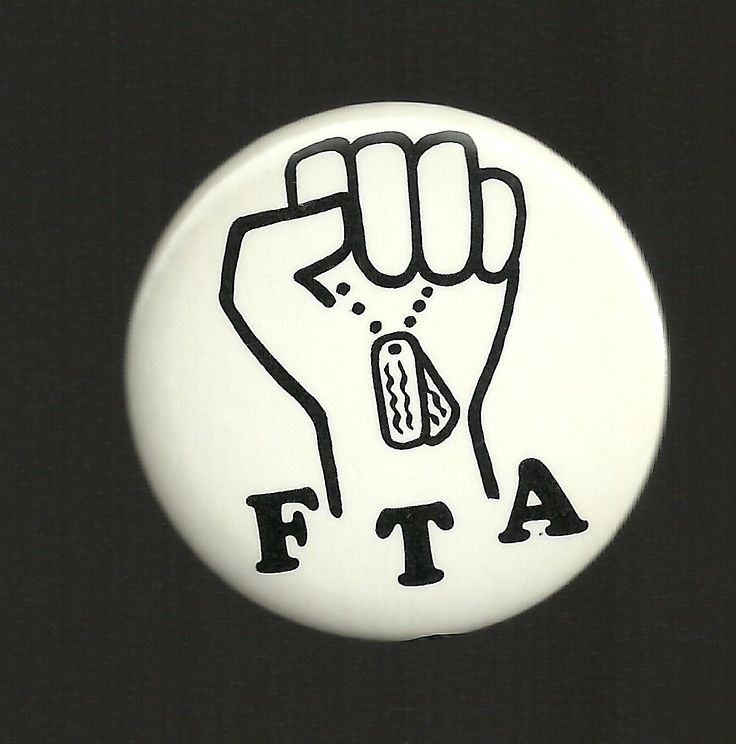
FTA was a common troupe expression as shown in this button from the GI group Movement for a Democratic Military

Several of the tour's skits are interspersed with footage of the cast singing the show's theme song, The Lifer's Song (or The FTA Song). The song is an irreverent ditty written around the common troop expression FTA, which really meant "Fuck The Army" and which, in turn, was a play on the Army recruitment slogan "Fun, Travel and Adventure". During the Vietnam War, FTA was often scrawled on the side of walls and scratched onto bathroom stalls. The song tells the story of a pro-military "lifer" who is trying to figure out what FTA means. He hears it in "Leesville", "Waynesville", "Fayetteville", and "a Texas paradise called Killeen" - all towns with major military bases. Just "three little words" he complains, "but I can't find out what they mean." Is it "Future Teachers of American", "Free The Antarcticans", "Free The Army?" Help me, the singers appeal to the audience. On the tour, when the troupe came to the last line they always hesitated, encouraging the audience to supply the real meaning of FTA, which the GIs invariably did with a thundering "FUCK the Army". "Extra letters and words were added as needed, depending upon the composition of the audience. FTA would become 'FTAF' or 'FTN,' or 'FTM' — or all four at once, spelled out in a triumphant, expletive-filled list." In the film we see "the singers exaggeratedly trying to contain themselves" as they reach the first word in the last line. "[I]t seems the singers want the audience to understand that they really want to say 'Fuck the Army,' but they perform the pretense that they can't quite or won't, for whatever reason, bring themselves to do it the first time through. The second time, as they are making the long, drawn-out beginning of the word, Len Chandler turns and says quietly (but the mic picks it up) 'say it!' — and they do..., they shout 'Fuck the Army.'"

=== Reaching out to women GIs ===
During the later parts of the tour, which are those included in the film, new material was added into the show addressing other issues swirling in the political currents of the early 1970s, including women's issues, particularly as they confronted women in the military. One skit has a clearly pregnant soldier's wife being told by the military doctor to "go home and take two APCs [an aspirin compound] and come back when the swelling goes down."

Another example is the song Tired of Bastards Fucking Over Me written by Beverley Grant and sung by Fonda, Near, Martinson and Donegan. Sung to "an audience composed in large part of visiting enlisted women in the USAF", it describes experiences of everyday sexism from a woman's point of view, "with each brief narrative punctuated by a chorus":

Now I sing this song in the hope that you won't think it's a joke
cause it's time we all awoke to take a stand.
We've been victims all our lives, now it's time we organized
and to fight we're gonna need each other's hands.
They whistle like a dog and makes noises like a hog,
heaven knows they sure got problems I agree.
But their problems I can't solve 'cause my sanity's involved,
and I'm tired of bastards fuckin' over me

A professor of film described this combining of women's issues with GI antiwar sentiment, as positing "a total continuity...between a woman's right to control her body and that of a young male GI to refuse to give his body in a futile war."

When these feminist elements were combined with the multi-racial cast and anti-racist message, the tour and film "stood in sharp contrast to Bob Hope's show. Whereas Hope made racist jokes, FTA embraced racial equality and took seriously the grievances of non-whites. While Hope joked about sexual assault and unapologetically objectified the women in his cast, FTA endorsed women's liberation and featured women as full participants in the show — without forcing them to don sexually provocative clothing."

=== Skits ===
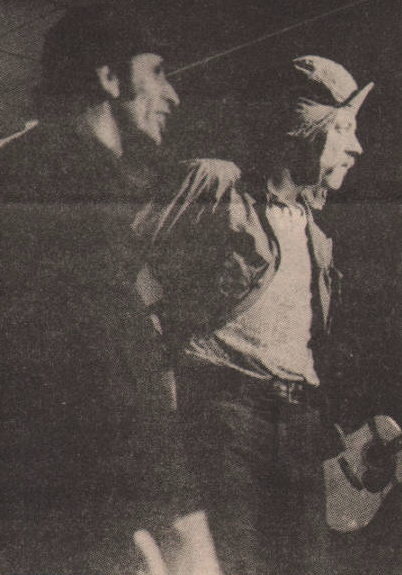
Alaimo as the Sergeant and Sutherland as the Private

Various sketches or skits from the show are shown throughout the film. Many of them reflected the common dislike of enlisted soldiers for their officers and non-commissioned officers, which became particularly sharp during the Vietnam War. In one sketch a Sergeant (played by Michael Alaimo) tells a soldier, "I think I'm gonna get me a watchdog." "What do you need a watchdog for, Sarge?" replies the GI, "You're surrounded by two hundred armed men." "That's why I'm gonna get me a watchdog," says the Sarge.

In Okinawa, we see a performance by a group of Okinawan musicians who have joined the show. The lyrics of their songs (shown in subtitles) "are sharply critical of U.S. presence on the island. The singers stand straight at the microphones, their eyes closed. At the song's conclusion the audience instantly roars with applause."

=== Pro-Vietnam War hecklers ===
There is a particularly interesting confrontation shown in the film that occurred the night they performed just outside Yokosuka Naval Base in Japan. There was, according to spokesperson Steve Jaffe, "an audience of nearly 1,400 included some 500 GIs." Some pro-Vietnam War hecklers tried to disrupt the show and were quoted as saying "they liked to go to Vietnam to kill people because they made $65 extra a month in combat pay." In the film, you can see other members of the audience begin to heckle the hecklers and then Donald Sutherland speaks to the crowd, "If you want them to leave, would you tell them?" The audience erupted in "noisy agreement" while a number of sailors from the USS Oklahoma City "slowly but surely, confidently but peacefully" escort the hecklers out of the auditorium while Len Chandler leads the crowd in shouting "Out! Out! Out!" There has been some speculation that the pro-war hecklers were "undercover agents and provocateurs", which was not an uncommon tactic used by police agencies during the Vietnam War era, but no proof has emerged either way.

=== Donald Sutherland reads Johnny Got His Gun ===
The film ends with Donald Sutherland reading from Dalton Trumbo's 1938 novel Johnny Got His Gun:

Remember this well you people who plan for war. Remember this you patriots, you fierce ones, you spawners of hate, you inventors of slogans. Remember this as you have never remembered anything else in your lives. We are men of peace, we are men who work and we want no quarrel. But if you destroy our peace, if you take away our work, if you try to range us one against the other, we will know what to do. If you tell us to make the world safe for democracy we will take you seriously and by god and by Christ we will make it so. We will use the guns you force upon us, we will use them to defend our very lives, and the menace to our lives does not lie on the other side of a nomansland that was set apart without our consent it lies within our own boundaries here and now we have seen it and we know it.

== Release and controversy ==
F.T.A. was released in July 1972, "within days of Fonda's infamous visit to Hanoi" and seems to have suffered from the political fallout of Fonda's travels. The film "was in theatres barely a week before it was pulled from circulation by its distributor, American International Pictures." Even more, "[m]ost copies were destroyed", which seems to indicate an attempt to prevent any future for the film. Many have suspected the film's disappearance "was the result of government intervention." According to Parker, the film's director, "the film disappeared after Sam Arkoff, head of AIP, received a call from the White House." David Zeiger, who has been involved in resurrecting the original film, has been quoted as saying he believes Parker. "There's no proof, but I can't think of another reasonable explanation for Sam Arkoff, a man who knew how to wring every penny out of a film, yanking one starring Jane Fonda and Donald Sutherland from theaters at a big loss (and, apparently, destroying all of the prints, since none were ever found)."

== Remastering and release ==
In 2009, David Zeiger, the director of Sir! No Sir!, a film about the GI resistance to the Vietnam War, finished resurrecting the original F.T.A. film. It was shown publicly in Los Angeles in early 2009 at the American Cinematheque with a panel that included two of the original performers in the show. It was also shown at the IFC Center in New York City and had its broadcast premiere on the Sundance Channel on February 23, 2009. It is currently available on the Netflix streaming service.

Footage from the film and discussion of the FTA Show is included in Zeiger's 2005 documentary film Sir! No Sir!.

In February 2021, Kino Lorber acquired distribution rights to the film, and set it for a March 5, 2021, release in virtual cinema.

== Reception ==
On Rotten Tomatoes, the film has an approval rating of 84% based on reviews from 25 critics, with an average rating of 7.60/10. "According to a The Washington Post reviewer who attended a screening of the film, the black humor in F.T.A. had Vietnam veterans 'laughing harder than anyone.'" Dr. Mark Shiel, Lecturer in Film Studies at King's College London, commented in a 2007 essay that the film "brought together elements of the Old and New Lefts, radical politics and Hollywood celebrity, in an exceptional, and exceptionally powerful, way." The New York Times reviewer said the show itself "must have been very funny", but felt "as presented in the movie, most of the show doesn't seem very funny". He did describe, however, a "striking sequence" when "an anti-American guerrilla theater pageant in the Philippines...momentarily turns revolutionary passion into a romantic gesture of extraordinary beauty." He also praises the "lovely ballad singing of Rita Martinson." A Los Angeles Times reviewer, after viewing the 2009 remastered version, described the show as a "fascinating documentary" that "mixes protest songs with broad and bawdy skits, taking potshots at military chauvinism and top-brass privilege." He concluded, "what it lacks in finesse, it makes up for with a raucous energy." The Harvard Crimson described the film as "bouncing through satiric routines on the bungling authority that got us involved in Vietnam." The reviewer also felt the "routines and the film anticipate that a certain set of opinions will be held by the audience, that the young military people and the young movie-goer will share its anti-military, anti-Vietnam [War] position." Michael Atkinson, writing on IFC.com, called the film "a document of disarming anti-authoritarian nerve" and says "the spirit of the thing is infectious and energizing". He also notes that the "film is, in any case, remarkable for how little it is known and how rarely it's been seen".

== See also ==
- Concerned Officers Movement, officers group opposed to the Vietnam War
- Court-martial of Howard Levy, early resister to the Vietnam War
- Donald W. Duncan, Master Sergeant U.S. Army Special Forces early register to the Vietnam War
- Fort Hood Three, three early resisters to the Vietnam War
- GI Coffeehouses, antiwar coffeehouses near U.S. military bases
- GI Underground Press
- GI's Against Fascism, early group of Navy resisters to the Vietnam War
- List of American films of 1972
- Opposition to United States involvement in the Vietnam War
- Presidio mutiny, 27 soldiers refused to participate in the military and the war
- Sir! No Sir!, a 2005 documentary about the anti-war movement within the ranks of the United States Armed Forces
- Soldiers in Revolt: GI Resistance During the Vietnam War, book about soldier & sailor resistance during the Vietnam War
- Stop Our Ship (SOS) anti-Vietnam War movement in and around the U.S. Navy
- Vietnam Veterans Against the War
- Winter Soldier Investigation, investigation of war crimes in the Vietnam War
