= FTA Show =

1971 political vaudeville antiwar show

FTA Show (Fuck The Army Show)
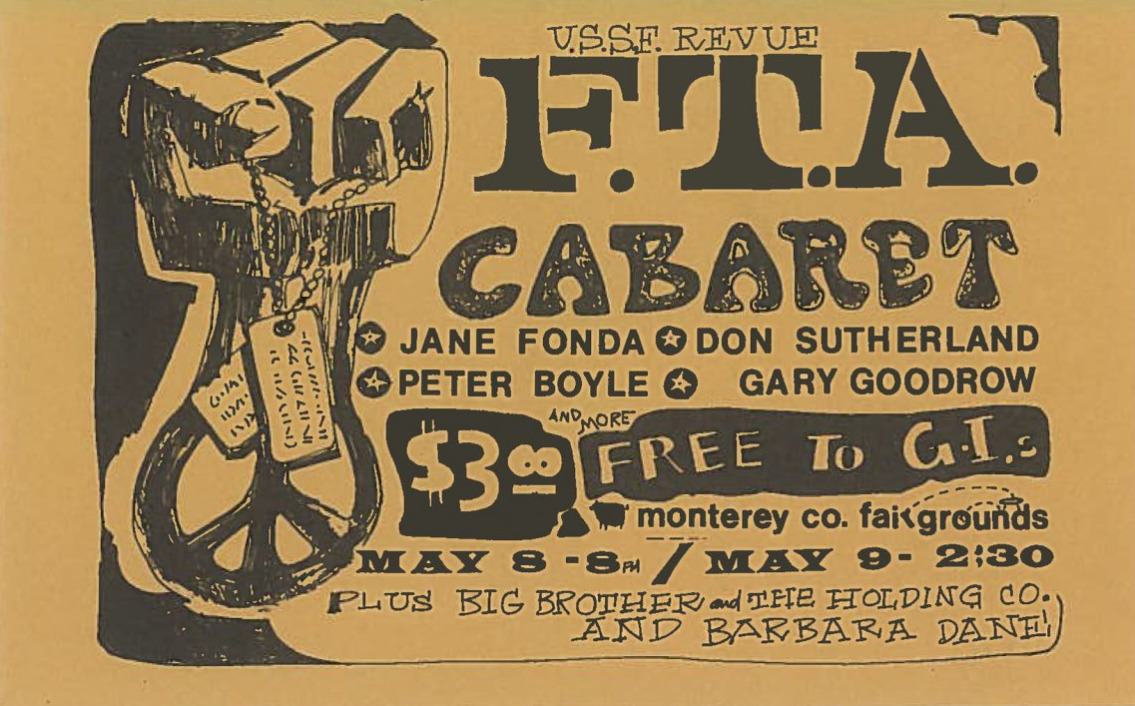
- Ticket from FTA performance in Monterey, California 1971
- Genre: Political vaudeville
- Show type: Touring
- Date of premiere: Fayetteville, North Carolina, outside Fort Bragg Army Base March 14, 1971
- Final show: Yokosuka, Japan outside Yokosuka US Naval Base December 22, 1971

Creative team
- Directors: Alan Myerson, Francine Parker and Nina Serrano
- Writers: Jules Feiffer, Carl Gottlieb, Herb Gardner, Fred Gardner, Barbara Garson, Robin Menken, Nina Serrano and Pamela Donegan
- Actors: Jane Fonda, Donald Sutherland, Peter Boyle, Garry Goodrow, Michael Alaimo, Howard Hesseman, Elliott Gould, Mike Nichols, Carl Gottlieb, Larry Hankin, Ben Vereen, Darryl Henriques and Yale Zimmerman
- Comedians: Dick Gregory, Paul Mooney
- Musicians & singers: Swamp Dogg, Holly Near, Len Chandler, Rita Martinson, Barbara Dane, Johnny Rivers, Nina Simone and Country Joe McDonald
- Advance people: Fred Gardner, James Skelly, Elaine Elinson, Louis Wolf and Bill Belmont
- Publicist: Steve Jaffe

Other information
- Sponsors: United States Servicemen's Fund (USSF), Entertainment Industry for Peace & Justice (EIPJ), Pacific Counseling Service and Beheiren (Japan Peace for Vietnam Committee)

The FTA Show (or FTA Tour or Free The Army tour), a play on the common troop expression "Fuck The Army" (which in turn was a play on the army slogan "Fun, Travel and Adventure"), was a 1971 anti-Vietnam War road show for GIs designed as a response to Bob Hope's patriotic and pro-war USO (United Service Organizations) tour. The idea was first conceived by Howard Levy, an ex-US Army doctor who had just been released from 26 months in Fort Leavenworth military prison for refusing orders to train Green Beret medics on their way to the Vietnam War. Levy convinced actress Jane Fonda to participate and she in turn recruited a number of actors, entertainers, musicians and others, including the actors Donald Sutherland, Peter Boyle, Garry Goodrow and Michael Alaimo, comedian and civil rights activist Dick Gregory and soul and R&B singer Swamp Dogg (Jerry Williams Jr). Alan Myerson, of San Francisco improv comedy group The Committee, agreed to direct, while cartoonist and author Jules Feiffer and playwrights Barbara Garson and Herb Gardner wrote songs and skits for the show. Fred Gardner, the originator of the antiwar GI Coffeehouse movement, became the Tour's "stage manager and liaison to the coffeehouse staffs." At various times other actors, writers, musicians, comedians and entertainers were involved (see infobox). The United States Servicemen's Fund (USSF), with Dr. Levy as one of its principal organizers, became the official sponsor of the tour. The anti-Vietnam War USSF promoted free speech within the US military, funded and supported independent GI newspapers and coffeehouses, and worked to defend the legal rights of GIs. Sponsorship was later taken over by a group called the Entertainment Industry for Peace & Justice (EIPJ).

== Anti-Bob Hope USO Tour ==
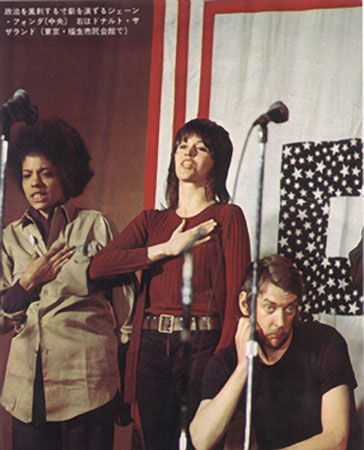
Rita Martenson, Jane Fonda and Donald Sutherland

The FTA Show was explicitly created as a counter to Bob Hope's pro-war USO tour. For many years the USO had been organizing patriotic pro-military shows at US overseas military bases. Bob Hope became the most famous symbol of these shows through annual Christmas shows and a yearly nationally broadcast TV special. Hope "unequivocally supported the American mission in Vietnam", and praised General Westmoreland at the end of his 1965 Christmas show for "giving of all his military genius trying to preserve American lives and principles." As anti-Vietnam War sentiment increased in the U.S., Hope admitted in 1966 that "'a few' performers had turned down his invitation to join his Christmas tour for servicemen in South Vietnam because they disapproved of United States policy", but confirmed his own commitment to the war, saying "We ought to move a little faster – hawk style." Further, Hope's old fashioned vaudeville-rooted style and jokes "began to fall flat for audiences of young GIs, who often found [his] show corny at best, offensive at worst." His retro comedy often "objectified his female co-stars" and included "racist jokes." "During one show he infamously joked that the bombing of North Vietnam was 'the best slum clearance project they ever had,' insulting the humanity of Vietnamese and denigrating American minorities who lived in so-called slums." In 1970 The New York Times quoted one of Hope's writers, "He just doesn't understand how the G.I. of today feels." The writer jokingly continued, "When he sees a V sign in his audience he thinks two guys want to go to the bathroom." The Times also cited a Newsweek magazine report: "Hope was met by 'a barrage of boos' last December when he said President Nixon had asked him to tell the troops he had 'a solid plan for ending the war.'" At a Saigon USO show in 1970, an opening act of GI musicians dedicated their first song to "Mr. Bob Hope" and proceeded to play the heavy metal antiwar classic by Black Sabbath, "War Pigs".

=== The FTA Show is formed ===
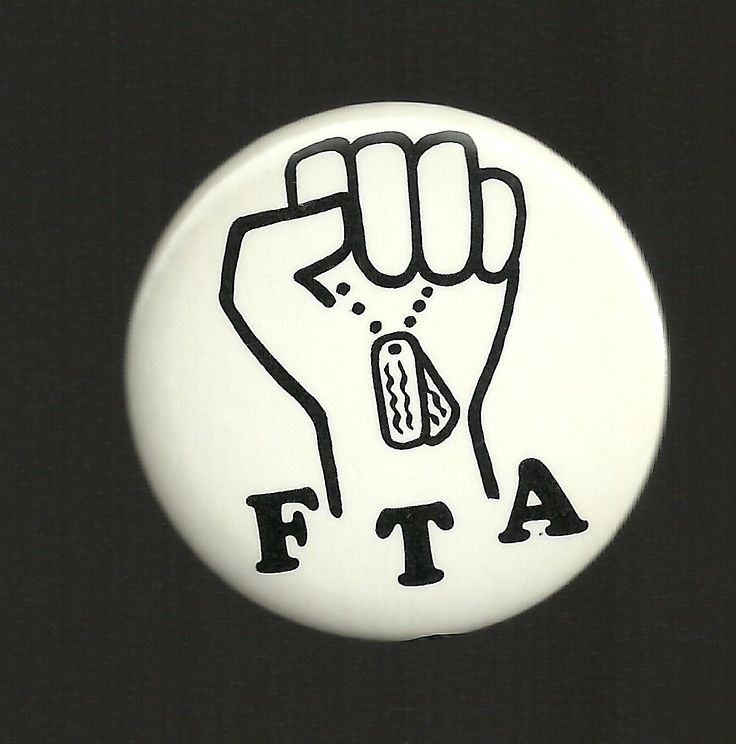
"FTA" was a common troupe expression, as shown in this button from the GI group Movement for a Democratic Military.

These contending views intensified and by 1970 both The New York Times and The Washington Post were taking note of U.S. troop "disillusionment with Hope's humor and prowar message". Fonda told reporters that the FTA Show was inspired by "articles in The Washington Post and The New York Times about soldiers in Vietnam who were dissatisfied with the typical USO shows." She told a reporter from the Times that the show would reinforce "what the soldiers already know. They know that the war is insane. They know what GIs have to contend with better than we do. We're simply saying, 'We know what you're up against and we support you.'" Fonda was convinced "The military is filled with men who are against the war!" She explained:

Most of them are enlisted men from working-class families—not college student who were drafted. They are the sons of the hard-hats, and they form the link that has been missing so long between the essentially white, middle-class peace movement and the working class. They have very few options—so they join the army. Well, it doesn't take them very long to understand that they're being messed over. And they start doing something about it. Then they go back into the factories and they begin to have an effect on the political complexion of the country.

The same reporter pointed out that Fonda had a lot to lose and asked whether she feared "for her career in movies?" Fonda responded, "if, because of my political activities, I were prevented from working in Hollywood—and there are no indications that that is likely to happen—I would work elsewhere. That's all."

By the time the FTA Show had travelled around the continental U.S. and was headed to Hawaii and then Asia, they had developed a more official statement of purpose:

The G.I. movement exists on nearly every United States military installation around the world. It is made up of American servicemen and women who have come to realize that if there is to be an end to the U.S. military involvement in South East Asia — an end to the war — it is they who must end it.

In response to the invitation of servicemen and women within the G.I. movement we have formed the F.T.A. Show in order to support their fight to end discrimination against people because of race, sex, class, religion and personal or political belief.

The F.T.A. Show

By the end of 1971 when the tour ended, in addition to its clear anti-Vietnam War thrust, the "racially-inclusive and pro-feminist messages of FTA stood in sharp contrast to Bob Hope's show. Whereas Hope made racist jokes, FTA embraced racial equality and took seriously the grievances of non-whites. While Hope joked about sexual assault and unapologetically objectified the women in his cast, FTA endorsed women's liberation and featured women as full participants in the show – without forcing them to don sexually provocative clothing."

== The tour ==
By the spring of 1971, a three-hour program had been developed, which was "rehearsed in New York City for a few weeks before taking the show on the road." The tour, referred to as "political vaudeville" by Fonda and The New York Times, began to visit military towns throughout the U.S. and then Asia with the goal of establishing a dialogue with soldiers about their upcoming deployments to Vietnam. At a press conference in New York City, Fonda and Dr. Levy announced their plans to kick off the FTA Tour in Fayetteville, North Carolina, near the Fort Bragg Army base. The initial plans were for "an ambitious twenty-stop tour" of U.S. military bases, and the final results were even more impressive. According to Fonda in her autobiography, they performed "for some fifteen thousand GIs near major U.S. military bases" before heading overseas where they "did twenty-one performances". All told, "between March and December of 1971, the show toured to over 64,000 troops, playing near, but never on, bases in North Carolina, California, Washington, Texas, Idaho, New Jersey, Okinawa, Japan, the Philippines, and Hawaii." And this, even when GIs "might risk official or unofficial discipline for attending an antiwar show". One historian, quoting a The Washington Post reporter, described the show's popularity as "notable, considering the fact that 'it wasn't easy' for active-duty military personnel to attend FTA. Military authorities routinely 'put out misinformation about the time and place,' and GIs had to travel at their own expense (though the show itself was free). They also risked being photographed and harassed; Fonda recalls that the CID, 'the military equivalent of the CIA, was always around taking snapshots.'"

=== Fort Bragg ===
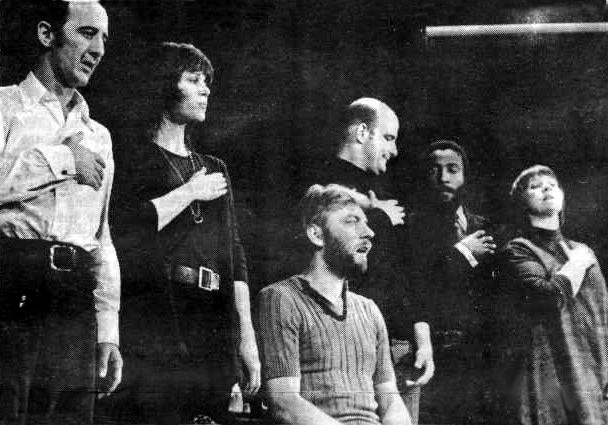
Original cast. From left: Gary Goodrow, Jane Fonda, Donald Sutherland, Peter Boyle, Dick Gregory, and Barbara Dane at the Haymarket GI Coffeehouse near Fort Bragg.

Before arriving in Fayetteville, near Fort Bragg, tour organizers sent the show's script to the base's commanding General asking for permission to perform on the base. Dr. Levy told the press with a straight face, "We expect his full cooperation", noting they had "contingency plans" to perform in the local Haymarket GI Coffeehouse off base, which is where they ended up. They also applied to use the Fayetteville municipal auditorium and sued when pro-military city officials turned them down. A federal judge overruled the city, which then demanded a $150,000 insurance policy for the performance, a "prohibitive" expense for the Tour. The coffeehouse could hold less than 500 people, so "the troupe put on a series of performances, to packed houses of GIs, over the course of two days and nights" starting on March 14, 1971. The initial cast included Fonda, Sutherland, Boyle, Gregory, Gould, Dane, Goodrow, Swamp Dogg and Johnny Rivers.

The New York Times reported that the "antiwar, anti-military" show "clearly went over well" with the "exuberantly shouting" GIs. Their chants of "Join the GI Movement, boys, join the GI movement." could be heard out on the street. The historian, David L. Parsons, wrote, "By most media accounts, the FTA show's premier in Fayetteville was a huge hit among the soldiers who crowded into the coffeehouse."

=== Fort Ord ===
The FTA's second stop took place on May 8 and 9 near Fort Ord, at the Monterey County Fairgrounds in California. There were three shows with over 900 attendees at each, most "coming from among Fort Ord's 25,000 personnel". Many of the GIs who attended indicated they were "attending an antiwar event for the first time." The organizers had again unsuccessfully requested permission to stage the show on base. The cast included Goodrow, Fonda, Sutherland and Hesseman, while musical entertainment was provided by Big Brother and the Holding Company and, on Saturday night, Johnny Rivers. Starting with the Monterey shows the "folksinger Len Chandler first joined the group" staying for the rest of the tour. Chandler particularly impressed the local underground GI newspaper, Every GI is a P.O.W., which called him "absolutely fantastic". "The music he played and the social connotations blended very well to send a fantastic feeling thru the crowd." The crowd "really ate it up", they wrote. The paper also praised a local Monterey women's group which put on a skit "drawing on the similarities of women's oppression to the GI's oppression." P.O.W. also complained that the commander at Fort Ord had allowed Canned Heat on the base, but not the FTA Show. They told him to get off his fat ass "and take a look around you." "And don't try and rack your brain trying to figure out what FTA stands for because it's not in any army code book. It means Fuck the Army."

=== San Diego Navy and Marine bases ===
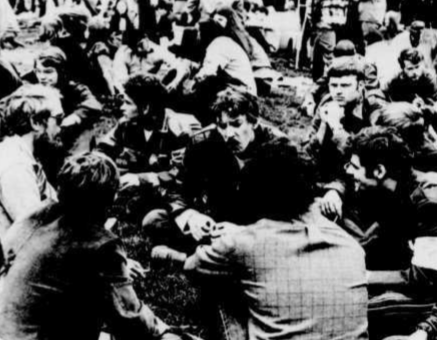
Don Sutherland talking with GIs in San Diego Balboa Park in May 1971, from Liberty Call

One week later, on May 15 and 16, the FTA performed at Russ Auditorium in San Diego, California to capacity crowds of almost 5,000 sailors and marines from the area's numerous military bases. This time, the organizers had first requested to perform not on a base but on the deck of an aircraft carrier, the U.S.S. Constellation. As described by historian David Cortright:

Several weeks before the scheduled May 15 performances, Concerned Military circulated a petition requesting that the show be presented on the deck of the carrier U.S.S. Constellation (a courtesy routinely extended to the Bob Hope USO Show). Although nearly fifteen hundred members of the crew signed the appeal, Captain Harry Gerhard flatly rejected it. Nonetheless, the show's performances in San Diego were a huge success, attracting over four thousand people, a majority of them servicepeople.

Each show opened with California Country, a local rock group, followed by Teatro Mestizo, a Chicano theater group from San Diego State, who "performed a hard-hitting play about the life and death of a young Chicano soldier killed in Vietnam." A local GI underground newspaper, Liberty Call, reported, "There was little question that the audience was in full agreement with the anti-war theme of the show. As in Monterey, the paper was very impressed with Len Chandler", describing him as "one of those rare singers who combine a wonderful voice, excellent musicianship and witty songs with incredible warmth and rapport." Liberty Call also wrote that after the first show, "many private citizens opened their homes to servicemen so that they might spend the night and avoid the dreariness of returning to bases and ships." On Sunday, before the second show, many sailors and marines joined the cast of the show in Balboa Park for a picnic. One of the authors of the Liberty Call article, James Skelly, became the advance person for the next two FTA Shows outside military bases in Tacoma, Washington and Mountain Home, Idaho. Fred Gardner, the show's first advance person, described him as a likable "big guy" with a big mustache.

=== Fort Lewis and McChord Air Force Base ===
The next shows were on August 7 and 8 in Tacoma, Washington near the Fort Lewis Army base and the McChord Air Force Base, and they twice filled the 3,000-seat Tacoma Sports Arena with cheering soldiers, despite the fact that basic trainees at the bases had been denied weekend passes. Again, the organizers had unsuccessfully tried to get permission to perform on base, and were also turned down when they attempted to run an ad for the show in the Fort Lewis official base newspaper. Several new performers joined the troupe in Tacoma, including the Broadway actor and dancer, Ben Vereen and the rocker Country Joe McDonald who received standing ovations at both shows. Country Joe was already famous among GIs for his song "The "Fish" Cheer/I-Feel-Like-I'm-Fixin'-to-Die Rag" whose chorus "One, two, three, what are we fighting for?" had become an anthem of the antiwar movement. He always started the song with the "Fish Cheer", a call-and-response with the audience spelling the word "fish", although by the time of these performances it had evolved into the "Fuck Cheer", which the GIs loved. Knowing what the GIs most wanted to hear, Country Joe, teased them by singing three or four other songs before smiling, looking straight at the audience and shouting, "Give me an F!" The thunderous response was explosive. The local GI underground newspaper, the Lewis-McChord Free Press, reported that the show was "very funny" and "the crowd was beautiful".

=== Mountain Home Air Force Base ===
The FTA then moved on to the Covered Wagon coffeehouse just outside the Mountain Home Air Force Base near Boise, Idaho on August 14 and 15. The Covered Wagon shows were completely sold out, as were two shows the day before at Boise State College's Liberal Arts Auditorium. While in town, several members of the cast went with staff from the local GI Coffeehouse, the Covered Wagon, to the base cafeteria on the Air Force Base. Since the civilians were the guests of coffeehouse staff who were in the military, they couldn't be kicked out. According to a GI underground newspaper, CAMP News, the Air Force military intelligence agents from the Office of Special Investigations "had a busy day as over 100 GIs and officers filled the cafeteria" to see the cast. The "agents took notes" and "made a film record of the event". Some soldiers made sure the Air Force knew how they felt by going up "to the agents and offer[ing] their names."

=== Fort Hood and San Antonio ===
On September 18 and 19 the FTA performed in Killeen, Texas just outside Fort Hood Army base (nowadays Fort Cavazos) and then in San Antonio on the 20th. Again the organizers had applied for permission to perform on base and had been denied. They then applied to rent the local high school auditorium and, when that was turned down, took the issue to court. The day before the first scheduled show the court denied their petition forcing the performances into the relatively small local GI Coffeehouse, the Oleo Strut, whose maximum legal capacity was 250. With people "sitting on the floor as tightly as possible", they played five shows over two days "to packed houses and enthusiastic crowds", with others standing "outside to listen or catch a glimpse of the show."

The local GI underground newspaper, Fatigue Press, reported that Fonda spoke to the audience at the last show on Sunday the 19th. She "explained that the purpose of the FTA Show was to entertain and show support for the GI movement." She said they were "not alone in our struggle as places and groups such as these exist at almost every military installation in the U.S." She expressed her solidarity with the GIs and their families and said that by "uniting we can resist, we can end the war, we can attain our denied rights, we can end racism and sexism in the military and we can FREE THE ARMY." Also on Sunday, the cast went to a picnic at the a local park with many of the GIs who weren't able to get into the shows. In another indication of the sentiments of local government officials, when cast members began to put on some of their skits from the show, the town's police forced them to stop. In San Antonio, "the show filled a downtown club with over 2,300 spectators, 'military, front to back […] Less than 50 tickets were sold to civilians,' according to the San Antonio Light.

=== Lincoln Center ===
On November 21, 1971, prior to departing for U.S. military bases in the Pacific, the FTA held a benefit performance in New York City at Lincoln Center's Philharmonic Hall before a civilian audience of 2,000. The performance, which was billed as "the first performance for civilians", earned a "Special Citation" Obie for the 1971–72 season. A few new entertainers joined the cast, including poet and activist Pamela Donegan, singer Holly Near, comedian Paul Mooney, and pianist Yale Zimmerman. Other celebrities came to show support, including Nina Simone, Dick Gregory, Ossie Davis, Faye Dunaway, and Eli Wallach, all of whom participated in an opening "Broadway salute to the GI movement". The New York Times reviewer commented, "the audience was asked to pretend that it was in the Army", but "[t]here was no need for fantasizing. By any measure, this is an easily enjoyable show — although certainly Army experience would make it seem more impertinent."

=== Hawaii military bases ===
In Hawaii, the show performed at the Civic Auditorium in Honolulu on Thanksgiving Day. More than 4,000 people attended the show, including approximately 2,500 GIs and "several hundred crew members" from the USS Coral Sea, which had just arrived from San Francisco where many of its crew had been involved in and influenced by the significant Stop Our Ship movement then taking place in California. After the show, approximately 50 crewmen met with the show's cast and, when the ship pulled out of port to continue to Southeast Asia, 53 sailors were missing.

=== U.S. military bases in the Philippines ===
Six shows were scheduled in the Philippines between November 28 and December 6, 1971, four near U.S. military bases. The first two performances on November 28 and 29 were held at YAP Park near Clark Air Force Base in Angeles City. According to military intelligence records submitted to a Congressional investigation by the House Committee on Internal Security, over 2,000 people attended the two shows, the majority of whom "appeared to be either young USAF members or USAF dependents." The next show on December 1 was in the auditorium at Saint Louis University in Baguio where the John Hay Air Force Base was located. The auditorium was packed with over 5,000 people, mostly "college-age Filipinos", again according to military intelligence. The next two shows were on December 4 and 5 in Olongapo City where the U.S. Naval Base at Subic Bay was located. Subic Bay at the time was the U.S. Seventh Fleet's main base for repair and replenishment. Two other shows were scheduled to be presented in Manila, but it's unclear whether they occurred. For these shows skits were added depicting "the history of US colonialism in the Philippines and...explicitly linking the oppression of Filipinos with that of African Americans in the United States."

=== U.S. military bases in Japan ===
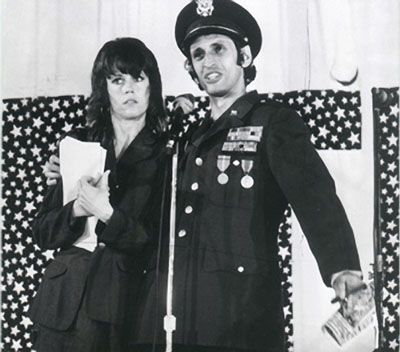
Jane Fonda and Michael Alaimo

When the FTA show arrived in Japan they ran into difficulties with the Japanese government. They arrived in Tokyo on December 7 from the Philippines and were initially denied entry into the country by Japan's Immigration Office on the grounds that they "possessed only tourist visas and no work permits." After a three-and-a-half-hour tense standoff in the airport, "the group was permitted to proceed to a hotel as the Office considered an appeal to its decision." Fonda immediately called a press conference at the hotel and, "in a tense and tired voice" stated:

Two months ago, the Japanese Consulate in Los Angeles, California, confirmed that our role as entertainers who did not receive financial compensation, whose purposes were to meet and entertain American GIs, would require a tourist visa and issued them to us. We are alarmed and distressed we should find ourselves here on this momentous anniversary, the 30th anniversary of the beginning of the Pacific War, that we should find ourselves on a mission of peace at the borders of the country that has one of the largest peace movements in the world, and that we should be denied entry.

A Board of Immigration spokesman told the press that "as tourists, they could not engage in theatrical performances or political activity of any kind." At another press conference a representative of the Japan Committee for Peace in Vietnam, who had welcomed the FTA Show to Japan, "claimed the Government action was prompted by 'fear that the entry of the FTA troupe might give impetus to antiwar activities by U.S. servicemen at U.S. military bases in Japan.'" Very soon immigration authorities agreed to allow the troupe to stay.

On December 10, they performed "to over 800 GIs in a hall meant to hold 520" at Fussa Citizens Hall, Fussa-Shi, Tokyo, about two blocks from the Yokota U.S. Air Force Base. During the Vietnam War, Yokota was a staging ground for B-52 bombing runs over Southeast Asia and a base for Air Force fighter squadrons. A troupe member reported in an article in the GI newspaper Cry Out that the "brass had warned Airmen not to go to the show — but the hall was packed." A Military intelligence report observed, "Audience reception of the show was warm and many joined in the singing and handclapping. The cast was given a standing ovation at the conclusion, despite the rather amateurish presentation." This report went on to say, "The use of profanity in the show was frequent and many of the songs and skits were crude, apparently being aimed at the young, first term enlisted man."

The next night they performed just outside Yokosuka Naval Base before "an audience of nearly 1,400 included some 500 GIs." Some pro-Vietnam War hecklers tried to disrupt the show and were quoted as saying "they liked to go to Vietnam to kill people because they made $65 extra a month in combat pay." Soon other members of the audience began to heckle the hecklers and then Donald Sutherland spoke to the crowd, "If you want them to leave, would you tell them?" The audience erupted in "noisy agreement" while a number of sailors from the USS Oklahoma City "slowly but surely, confidently but peacefully" escorted the hecklers out of the auditorium while Len Chandler led the crowd in shouting "Out! Out! Out!" There has been some speculation that the pro-war hecklers were "undercover agents and provocateurs", which was not an uncommon tactic used by police agencies during the Vietnam War era, but no proof has emerged either way.

Their next show in Japan, just outside the Iwakuni Marine Corps Air Station, occurred after they had returned from scheduled shows in Okinawa. At the end of this show, "two Marines read a petition calling for the end to discrimination of GIs on the basis of race or political belief and for the return of the base to the Japanese people." As the Marines read, "hundreds of GIs and Japanese raised their fists after each demand."

The last show in Japan was on December 22 at the Misawa City Civic Center, Misawa City, Japan, near the Misawa U.S. Air Base. Military intelligence reported "approximately 1,000 persons attended the show", estimating that 60 percent were Japanese and the rest GIs. Misawa is in northern Japan and the heater in the auditorium was broken with December temperatures well below freezing. Even so, a cast member reported that "we only shivered for the first few minutes — the unity of all the people singing together, fists raised...gave us warmth that we will never forget."

=== U.S. military bases in Okinawa ===
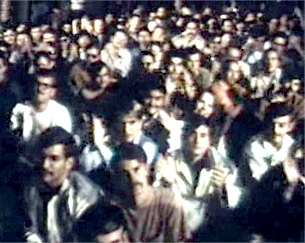
FTA Show Okinawa GI audience

The FTA Show performed twice in Okinawa near the U.S. military bases. The first night, on December 13, "an overflow crowd of GIs" watched the normal show, plus an Okinawan folk song group that told the crowd, "We do not like the American military — but we know there is a difference between you, the GIs, and the brass." The next day the troupe put on an outdoor show in a bullring.

== The shows ==
Much of the content for the shows came from GI newspapers. Often, the skits were based on antiwar and anti-military comic strips which had been reprinted in the GI underground press.

Highlights of the various shows included:

=== Jane Fonda and Gary Goodrow ===
A comedy skit with Fonda, playing Richard Nixon's wife, telling Gary Goodrow, as Nixon, that protesters were storming the Capitol:

Nixon answers: "We'd better call out the 82nd Airborne."
Mrs. Nixon replies: "But Richard, you don't understand, it IS the 82nd AIRBORNE!"

At each show the performers would use a military unit from the nearby base so GIs from the imagined unit storming the Capitol (or sometimes the White House) were sitting in the audience. According to Bragg Briefs, the base underground GI newspaper at Fort Bragg, when this routine was done there "The GI's response...was a tremendous roar of clenched fists raised in solidarity."

=== Donald Sutherland and Michael Alaimo ===
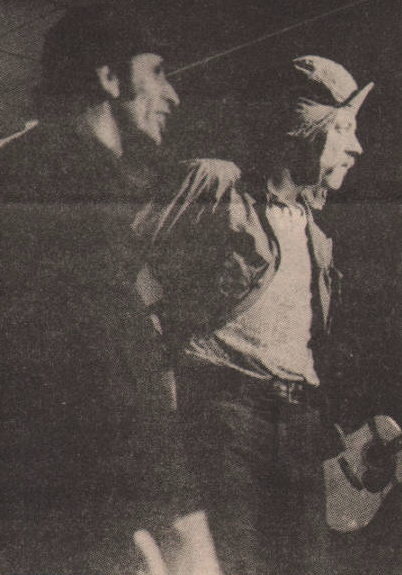
Alaimo and Sutherland

This skit had Michael Alaimo as an Army "lifer" (slang for a gung ho military type) worried about the loyalty of his own troops — an increasingly common concern as the Vietnam War continued.

Sergeant (Alaimo): I'm going to get a watch dog.

Private (Sutherland): Why do you need a watch dog? You're surrounded by 200 armed men.

Sergeant: That's why I'm gonna get the dog.

=== Peter Boyle ===
Another skit had Peter Boyle imitating a tough Nixon confronting his troops:

I have heard that there is dissent among the troops at Fort Ord (this always varied by location). Now let me make myself perfectly clear. I am here to gather a referendum on our role in Southeast Asia.

All those in favor of continued involvement in Southeast Asia say, "I". (Silence covers the whole audience)

All those in favor of immediate withdrawal from Southeast Asia say, "I". (Crowd roared)

Again, according to Bragg Briefs, when this was done for the Fort Bragg troops, "The cheer that followed this was more than a cheer, it was a spontaneous cry that burst from the throats."

=== Country Joe McDonald ===
Country Joe McDonald's "Fish Cheer", really "Fuck Cheer" at these shows, always brought every crowd to its feet. Here's the first verse and chorus that followed the cheer:

Yeah, come on all of you big strong men
Uncle Sam needs your help again
He's got himself in a terrible jam
Way down yonder in Vietnam
So put down your books, pick up a gun
Gonna have a whole lot of fun

And it's 1, 2, 3
What are we fighting for?
Don't ask me, I don't give a damn
Next stop is Vietnam
And it's 5, 6, 7
Open up the pearly gates
Ah, ain't no time to wonder why
Whoopee!

We're all going to die.

=== Len Chandler ===
Len Chandler would perform a revised version of "John Brown's Body" with the rousing chorus:

Move on over, or we'll move on over you

Move on over, or we'll move on over you
Move on over, or we'll move on over you

(For) the movement's movin' on!

=== The women in the cast ===
As the tour continued, new material was added into the show, addressing other issues swirling in the political currents of the early 1970s, including women's issues, racism and labor solidarity. One example was the song "Tired of Bastards Fucking Over Me" written by Beverley Grant. The song, sung in the F.T.A. film by Fonda, Near, Martinson and Donegan, describes experiences of everyday sexism from a woman's point of view, "with each brief narrative punctuated by a chorus":

They whistle for me like a dog and makes noises like a hog

Heaven knows they sure got problems I agree
But their problems I can't solve 'cause my sanity's involved

I'm tired of bastards fuckin' over me

=== Rita Martinson ===
When Rita Martinson, an African American, sang her moving ballad, "Soldier, We Love You", GIs were always powerfully moved:

I read that you took a stand

And refused to kill in Vietnam.
You said no man was your enemy
What he's fighting for is to be free.

Ghetto streets lead nowhere
Ghetto cries fill the air.
Uncle Sam's in Nam to loot and rob
And people starve at home cause there's no jobs.

Oh ain't it hard
To smile sometimes?
I know it's hard
To smile sometimes.

Soldier, we love you
Yeah, soldier we love you
Standing strong
'Cause it's hard to do
What you know you must do
Cause it's true

Yes, it's true.

=== Swamp Dogg ===
Swamp Dogg's "10-piece rock band was always a bit hit playing God Bless America for What and other songs.

=== Dick Gregory ===
Dick Gregory always got laughs with jokes like the one he did calling for the draft age to be raised to 75 so "all them older cats" will be sent "to Vietnam with John Wayne leading them."

=== The FTA Song ===
Every show included at least one performance of the show's theme song, "The Lifer's Song" (or "The FTA Song"), with most of the cast singing. The song is an irreverent ditty written around the common troop expression FTA, which really meant "Fuck The Army". During the Vietnam War, FTA was often scrawled on the side of walls and scratched onto bathroom stalls. The song tells the story of a pro-military "lifer" who is trying to figure out what FTA means. He hears it in "Leesville", "Waynesville", "Fayetteville", and "a Texas paradise called Killeen" — all towns with major military bases. Just "three little words" he complains, "but I can't find out what they mean." Is it "Future Teachers of American", "Free The Antarcticans", "Free The Army?" Help me, the singers appeal to the audience. When the troupe got to the last line they always hesitated, encouraging the audience to supply the real meaning of FTA, which the GIs invariably did with a thundering "FUCK the Army". "Extra letters and words were added as needed, depending upon the composition of the audience. FTA would become 'FTAF' or 'FTN,' or 'FTM' — or all four at once, spelled out in a triumphant, expletive-filled list." In the documentary of the tour, F.T.A., we see "the singers exaggeratedly trying to contain themselves" as they reach the first word in the last line. "[I]t seems the singers want the audience to understand that they really want to say 'Fuck the Army,' but they perform the pretense that they can't quite or won't, for whatever reason, bring themselves to do it the first time through. The second time, as they are making the long, drawn-out beginning of the word, Len Chandler turns and says quietly (but the mic picks it up) 'say it!' — and they do..., they shout 'Fuck the Army.'"

=== Donald Sutherland reads Johnny Got His Gun ===
Each performance ended with Donald Sutherland reading from Dalton Trumbo's 1938 novel Johnny Got His Gun:

Remember this well you people who plan for war. Remember this you patriots, you fierce ones, you spawners of hate, you inventors of slogans. Remember this as you have never remembered anything else in your lives. We are men of peace, we are men who work and we want no quarrel. But if you destroy our peace, if you take away our work, if you try to range us one against the other, we will know what to do. If you tell us to make the world safe for democracy we will take you seriously and by god and by Christ we will make it so. We will use the guns you force upon us, we will use them to defend our very lives, and the menace to our lives does not lie on the other side of a nomansland that was set apart without our consent it lies within our own boundaries here and now we have seen it and we know it.

== The film ==
In 1972 a U.S. documentary film called F.T.A. and directed by Francine Parker was released, which followed the show as it stopped in Hawaii, the Philippines, Okinawa, and Japan. Footage from the film and discussion of the FTA Show is included in the 2005 documentary film Sir! No Sir!.

== See also ==
- Donald W. Duncan, Master Sergeant U.S. Army Special Forces early register to the Vietnam War
- GI's Against Fascism
- Opposition to United States involvement in the Vietnam War
- Presidio mutiny
- Vietnam Veterans Against the War
- Waging Peace in Vietnam
- Winter Soldier Investigation
