= Francine Parker =

American film director

- Born: December 18, 1925; New York City, New York, U.S.
- Died: November 8, 2007 (aged 81); Los Angeles, California, U.S.
- Education: Smith College (BA); Yale University (MFA)
- Occupation: Director

Francine Parker (December 18, 1925 – November 8, 2007) was an American television and film director, who was one of the first female members of the Directors Guild of America. Parker was best known for her controversial documentary, F.T.A., which chronicled the antiwar entertainers tour, Free The Army tour (FTA), during the Vietnam War. The FTA tour and its documentary featured anti-Vietnam War celebrities Jane Fonda and Donald Sutherland interacting very frankly with American soldiers. Parker's film, which was released in 1972, was pulled from theaters within weeks of its release due to heavy criticism. It has been rarely viewed since 1972.

== Early life ==
Francine Parker was born in New York City as Francine Schoenholtz on December 18, 1925. She received her bachelor's degree from Smith College and her master's degree in theater directing from Yale School of Drama. Parker first arrived in Los Angeles in 1950.

== F.T.A. ==
Francine Parker's documentary of the Free The Army tour condensed weeks worth of footage and traveling into a ninety-minute film. This film did feature anti-war celebrities, such as Jane Fonda, but much of the screen time was also devoted to the reactions of disillusioned American servicemen. Parker filmed F.T.A. as she traveled with the tour onto American military bases in the eastern Pacific. Like the tour, FTA stood for Free The Army, though the thousands of soldiers featured in the film and the tour often used profanities when repeating the title. The film was co-produced by Francine Parker, Jane Fonda and Donald Sutherland.

Parker's film debuted in 1972, the same week that actress Jane Fonda visited Hanoi, the capital of North Vietnam. However, the film was pulled from theaters by American International Pictures just weeks later under what fellow filmmaker David Zeiger called "questionable circumstances."

F.T.A. was screened decades later at a Directors Guild of America screening in 2005. At the screening, director Oliver Stone said that Francine Parker had concluded that "calls were made from high up in Washington, possibly from the Nixon White House, and the film just disappeared." Jane Fonda also commented after viewing the film in 2005 that, "I must say, looking at it now, it's no wonder," that the film was pulled from theaters.

Director David Zeiger incorporated footage from Parker's film into his own 2005 film, Sir! No Sir!, which explored the anti-war movement spearheaded by soldiers in the 1960s and 1970s.

F.T.A. was screened again at the International Documentary Filmfestival Amsterdam on November 22, 2007. Francine Parker had been scheduled to attend before her death earlier in the same month.

== Career ==
Francine Parker was considered an anomaly when she began her career, because there were so few female film directors working in the industry. She was considered such a novelty that producers of the early 1960s television show What's My Line? asked her to appear on the show because they were sure that the panelists would never believe that a woman would be a television director. However, the show was canceled by the network before Parker could appear.

Parker produced a series of one-hour plays for PBS called "Jews and History" in 1966. The film series explored the contributions of Jews to the arts throughout history. In a review of Jews and History the Los Angeles Times seemed astounded of the, "odds of a female producer selling anthologized culture on television."

Parker was the eleventh woman to join the Directors Guild of America when she was inducted as a member in 1971. She taught film directing at the Art Center College of Design in Pasadena, California, for 18 years. She also taught acting at the Pasadena Playhouse College of Theatre Arts, and the American Academy of Dramatic Arts in Pasadena, California.

She helped found and became president of the Women for Equality in Media. As president, she led 1971 a march on the American Film Institute for its lack of women in AFI programs that were partially funded by the National Endowment for the Arts. The AFI responded. The number of women admitted to the AFI's Center for Advance Film Studies rose from zero in 1969 to seven women by 1973.

== Death ==
Francine Parker died of heart failure on November 8, 2007, at Cedars-Sinai Medical Center in Los Angeles, aged 81.
