= Long Bình Jail =

U.S. military stockade during the Vietnam War

Long Binh Jail (commonly called LBJ, the "LBJ Ranch", or Long Binh Stockade) was a U.S. military stockade located at Long Binh Post, in Đồng Nai Province, South Vietnam during the Vietnam War. 90% of the prisoners in the jail were African Americans. The handshake known as the "dap" was created here.

== History and operation ==
U.S Army, Vietnam, Installation Stockade (USARVIS), more commonly known as Long Binh Jail, was established in the summer of 1966 by the U.S. Army as a temporary stockade designed to hold about four hundred prisoners, located on Long Binh Post approximately 20 kilometers northeast of Saigon. It replaced a stockade that held about 200 prisoners located at Pershing Field, Tan Son Nhut Air Base at Saigon. Prisoners were separated by the seriousness of the charges or conviction against them and housed in tents with wooden floors. There were minimum, medium and maximum security areas for the prisoners as well as a mess hall, work areas and an administrative building. Maximum security prisoners were housed individually in five foot by 7 foot sheet metal and wood boxes or in CONEX containers measuring 6 foot by nine foot. When the stockade opened in 1966, the tents used in the minimum and medium security areas were designed to hold about eight men.

By August 1968 each contained fourteen men. It was estimated it would take about 280 officers and men to adequately control the stockade, but by August 1968 there were only ninety assigned. Men committing felonies requiring sentences of less than one year were assigned to LBJ for confinement, with the sentence considered "bad time" not applied towards their assigned 365-day tour in Vietnam, as well as their enlistment contract. LBJ also served as a holding facility for more serious crimes requiring confinement in the United States Disciplinary Barracks at Fort Leavenworth, Kansas. Others confined at LBJ included those awaiting trial as well as those who had served their sentence and awaiting being returned to their assigned unit. Often these were not wanted by their old unit, which would not issue orders for their transfer out of the stockade. The facility was closed in 1972 and the remaining prisoners and guards were assigned to the original stockade area at Pershing Field. Long Binh Jail was turned over to the South Vietnamese government on March 29, 1973, as the last combat troops departed Vietnam.

== 1968 Riot ==
After being called a slur by a white soldier, Gary Payton, an African-American enlisted man in the United States Army, abandoned his post in Vietnam. He was convicted for going AWOL and was sentenced to six months in the jail. He was given two 15 minute breaks from his small cell, and survived by eating lettuce rolled up in water. He was given the job of driving a truck outside of the stockade and burning the camp's feces with kerosene. Soon, a group of inmates convinced him to bring an extra can of kerosene back into the camp every other night.

On the night of August 29, 1968, a group of African American inmates approached the administration building at 11:45 p.m. and attacked the guards. Chaos erupted as other inmates joined the riot. They began to set fire to buildings using the kerosene provided by Payton, burning the mess hall, the barber shop, latrine, administration, and finance buildings. About 200 inmates took part in destroying the camp. The rioters assaulted white inmates as well as guards with impromptu weapons. Despite the violence, only four inmates escaped and one prisoner was killed. The next day, members of the 720th Military Police Battalion arrived. The MPs surrounded the camp and set up a perimeter at the gate. The riot ended on September 7, leaving 52 inmates and 63 MPs injured. Lieutenant Colonel Vern Johnson, the installation commander, never recovered from the beating he received from the prisoners and was eventually medically retired from the Army. The prisoners were moved to an area outside LBJ surrounded by barbed wire. Members of the 720th Military Police Battalion communication detachment were sent to rewire the prison. The sole fatality was Private Edward Haskett of St. Petersburg, Florida, who was beaten to death by the rioters with a shovel.

After the riot, the facility was rebuilt as a modern correctional institute and guards received appropriate training, social services were upgraded to include better mess facilities, and punishments became less arbitrary and more rational.

== See also ==
- Sir! No Sir!, 2005 documentary film on enlisted opposition to Vietnam War.
