= Curley Christian =

Canadian war veteran and activist

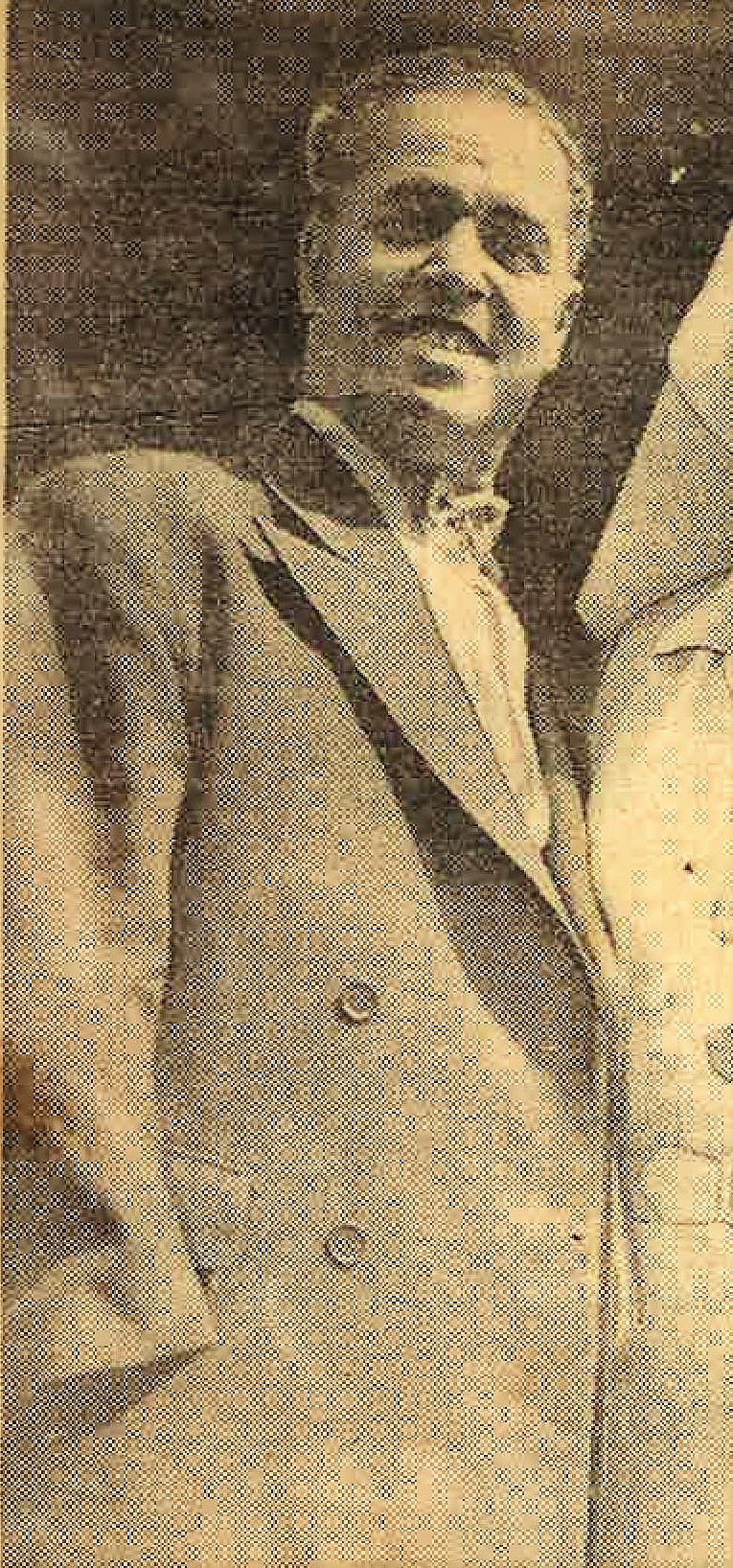
Curley Christian in 1936

Ethelbert "Curley" Christian (likely 15 April 1882 – 15 March 1954) was a Canadian First World War veteran and activist. He has been described as "one of Canada's best known black soldiers" from that war.

Details of Christian's early years are contradictory: he was most likely born in Homestead, Pennsylvania, in 1882, but may have been born in Virginia in 1884. He was raised Baptist and had three siblings. After leaving school at the age of 15 he travelled extensively and worked a number of odd jobs before settling in Canada. He enlisted in the Canadian Expeditionary Force in 1915 and was eventually assigned to the 78th Battalion, CEF.

During the Battle of Vimy Ridge, Christian was involved in supply transport. A shell hit a cargo drop point and he was trapped under debris for two days. An initial rescue failed when the stretcher-bearers were killed by artillery. Christian survived and was taken to a French military hospital. Because of the seriousness of his condition, he was evacuated to the Bethnal Green Military Hospital in London for treatment. His limbs were gangrenous and all four required amputation; Christian became the only quadruple amputee to survive from this war.

Christian returned to Canada aboard HMHS Llandovery Castle in September 1917. He received prosthetic limbs in Toronto. During his rehabilitation, he met volunteer aide Cleopatra "Cleo" McPherson, whom he married on 11 December 1920. The couple had one son, Douglas, who served in the Second World War as a sailor.

Christian's extensive medical needs required full-time caregiving. His wife petitioned for assistance from the federal government, leading to the establishment of the Attendance Allowance. This program offers disabled veterans funding to pay for caregiving needs. Christian designed a prosthesis for writing to allow him to correspond with other veterans; his correspondents included the Korean War's first quadruple amputee, US Army Private Robert Smith. He "became a sort of public figure, championing initiatives for the care of war amputees and disabled".

In July 1936 Christian was one of 6200 veterans invited to the dedication of the Canadian National Vimy Memorial. During this visit he introduced King Edward VIII to a group of fellow disabled veterans; this was subject to some media scrutiny as a potential breach of royal etiquette. The same year, he became a naturalized citizen of Canada. He also met King George VI and Queen Elizabeth when they visited Toronto in 1939.

Christian is buried in Prospect Cemetery in Toronto. He is memorialized on the Mural of Honour at The Military Museums. He may have been the inspiration for the 1938 novel Johnny Got His Gun and its subsequent adaptations.
