= Johnny Got His Gun =

1938 novel by Dalton Trumbo

- First edition
- Author: Dalton Trumbo
- Language: English
- Genre: Anti-war novel
- Published: September 3, 1939; J. B. Lippincott
- Publication place: United States
- Media type: Print (hardback & paperback)
- Pages: 309

Johnny Got His Gun is a war novel written in 1938 by American novelist Dalton Trumbo and published in September 1939 by J. B. Lippincott. The novel won one of the early National Book Awards: the Most Original Book of 1939. A 1971 film adaptation was written and directed by Trumbo.

== Plot ==
Joe Bonham, a young American soldier serving in World War I, awakens in a hospital bed after being caught in the blast of an exploding artillery shell. He gradually realizes that he has lost his arms, legs, and all of his face (including his eyes, ears, nose, teeth, and tongue), but that his mind functions perfectly, leaving him a prisoner in his own body.

Joe attempts suicide by suffocation, but finds that he has had a tracheotomy that he can neither remove nor control. He then decides that he wants to be placed in a glass coffin and toured around the country in order to demonstrate to others the true horrors of war. Joe eventually successfully communicates this with military officials after several months of banging his head on his pillow in Morse code. However, he realizes that the military will not grant his wish, nor will they put him out of his misery by euthanizing him, as it is "against regulations". It is implied that he will live the rest of his natural life in his condition.

As Joe drifts between reality and fantasy, he remembers his old life with his family and girlfriend, and reflects upon the myths and realities of war.

== Characters ==
Joe Bonham

Joe Bonham is the main character. He has all of his limbs amputated and his facial features removed (eyes, ears, nose, teeth, tongue.) Joe is also devoid of any senses except for that of touch. He is essentially a man trapped with his own thoughts.

Regular day nurse

The regular day nurse is described by Joe as a heavyset woman doing her job of care taking him. As Joe could not communicate, he squirms out of anticipation to be cared for, which she misreads for stress. She treats Joe as an animal rather than a human with a conscience; not accounting for the fact that Joe was trying to communicate. The nurse becomes agitated by Joe's tapping his head, unaware that he was communicating through Morse Code. She tries to alleviate what she misreads as Joe being stressed, and goes to the lengths of masturbating Joe once.

Bill Bonham (Joe's father)

Joe's father, Bill Bonham, courted Joe's mother and raised a family with her in Colorado. Bill is referenced throughout the novel during Joe's reminiscing of earlier times. In chapter one, it is said that Bill passes away. He is survived by Joe, his mother, and his younger sisters (one aged thirteen, one aged nine).

Marcia Bonham (Joe's mother)

Joe's mother, Marcia Bonham, was close to Joe and Bill. She was known for her cooking skills.

Kareen (Joe's girlfriend before he leaves for war)

Kareen, aged 19 at Joe's departure, is mentioned throughout the book as Joe floats between reality and fantasy. In chapter three, Kareen and Joe, with her father's reluctant approval, have sexual intercourse for the first time on the night before he leaves.

Diane (Joe's first girlfriend)

Diane is only mentioned in chapter four. In which it is mentioned that she, during her and Joe's relationship, began a relationship with a man named Glen Hogan. She also has an unfaithful relationship with Joe's best friend, Bill Harper.

Bill Harper (Joe's best friend)

Bill Harper warns Joe that Diane is in an unfaithful relationship with Hogan as she also has a relationship with Joe, to which Joe hits Bill. Joe later finds out that Bill was truthful and decides that he wants to renew their friendship. However, he finds Bill and Diane at her home and is hurt by both. The end of chapter four references how Bill was killed at Belleau Wood.

Howie

After his troubles with Diane and Glen Hogan, Joe meets Howie during chapter nine. It was found that Howie was never capable of keeping a relationship with a woman; and his girlfriend, Onie, also had an unfaithful relationship with Glen Hogan. Joe and Howie decided to not only forget about their partners, but to also forget about Glen Hogan. Joe and Howie join a group of Mexicans working on a railroad. However, once Howie receives an apologetic telegram from Onie, the boys decide to return home.

José

José worked at a bakery with Joe. He was given the job at the bakery through the local homeless shelter. José has many stories that set him apart from the other homeless workers, including the fact that he refused marriage to a wealthy woman. José wanted to work in Hollywood. When the opportunity presented itself to work for a picture company, José purposely gets fired because he feels his own personal honor will not allow him to quit on the boss that gave him his original opportunity.

New day nurse

The new day nurse was the first person to successfully communicate with Joe after his injuries. She moved her finger on his bare chest in the shape of the letter M until Joe signaled that he understood "M". She then spelled out "MERRY CHRISTMAS" and Joe signaled that he understood. The new day nurse then deduced that Joe's head-banging was in Morse Code and fetched someone who knew Morse Code.

== Title and context ==
The title is a play on the phrase "Johnny get your gun", a rallying call that was commonly used to encourage young American men to enlist in the military in the late 19th and early 20th centuries. That phrase was popularized in the George M. Cohan song "Over There", which was widely recorded in the first year of American involvement in World War I. Johnny Get Your Gun is also the name of a 1919 film directed by Donald Crisp.

Many of protagonist Joe Bonham's early memories are based on Dalton Trumbo's early life in Colorado and Los Angeles. The novel is inspired by articles about two men with severe injuries that Trumbo read about: the tearful hospital visit of Edward, Prince of Wales to Curley Christian, considered to be the only Canadian soldier in WWI who was a quadruple amputee, and a British major whose body was damaged so horrifically that he was reported as MIA to his family. The family discovered the truth years after his death in the hospital. "Though the novel was a pacifist piece published in wartime, it was well reviewed and won an American Booksellers Award in 1940." (It was published two days after the declaration of war in Europe, more than two years before the United States joined World War II.)

== Publication ==
Serialized in the Daily Worker in March 1940, published by the Communist Party USA to which Trumbo belonged, the book became "a rally point for the political left" which had opposed involvement in World War II during the period of the Molotov–Ribbentrop Pact (1939–1941) when the USSR maintained a non-aggression pact with Nazi Germany. Shortly after the 1941 German invasion of the Soviet Union, Trumbo and his publishers decided to suspend reprinting the book until the end of the war, due to the Communist Party USA's support for the war so long as the US was allied with the Soviet Union against Nazi Germany.

In his introduction to a 1959 reprinting, Trumbo describes receiving letters from right-wing isolationists requesting copies of the book when it was out of print. Trumbo contacted the FBI and turned these letters over to them. Trumbo regretted this decision, which he later called "foolish," after two FBI agents showed up at his home and it became clear that "their interest lay not in the letters but in me."

== Adaptations ==
- On March 9, 1940, a radio adaptation of Johnny Got His Gun was produced and directed by Arch Oboler, based on his script, and presented on the NBC Radio series, Arch Oboler's Plays. James Cagney voiced Joe Bonham on that broadcast.
- In 1971, Trumbo adapted for the screen and directed an eponymous film adaptation of the novel, starring Timothy Bottoms as Joe Bonham.
- Donald Sutherland reads a passage from the novel at the end of the 1972 anti- Vietnam-war documentary F.T.A. which was later re-edited into the 2005 documentary Sir! No Sir!.
- In 1982, Johnny Got His Gun was adapted into a stage play by Bradley Rand Smith, which has since been performed worldwide. Its first off-Broadway run starred Jeff Daniels, who won an Obie Award for his performance.
- In 1984, a television adaptation was filmed by director Miroslava Valová under the Czech name Johnny si vzal pušku. It was filmed via Czechoslovak Television in Prague, starring Michal Pešek, Petr Haničinec and Věra Galatíková.
- In 1988, Metallica released the studio album ...And Justice for All, which includes the song "One", heavily based on the book's events and depiction of Joe Bonham's condition. The music video for the song features several clips from the film adaptation.
- In 2008, Ben McKenzie starred in a solo performance in the "live on stage, on film" version of the play.
- From May 21, 2014, to June 14, 2014, the UK stage premiere, directed by David Mercatali and starring Jack Holden, ran at the Southwark Playhouse.

== See also ==
- Anti-war movement
- Antimilitarism
- The Diving Bell and the Butterfly
- Euthanasia
- Right to die
