= Victor Agosto =

American activist (born 1985)

- Born: May 13, 1985 (age 41); Miami, Florida, U.S.
- Military career
- Allegiance: United States
- Branch: United States Army
- Service years: 2005-2009
- Rank: Private (PVT) (formerly Specialist)
- Units: C Co. 57th ESB (Fort Hood, TX)
- Conflicts: War on terrorism: Iraq War
- Awards: Iraq Campaign Medal; Army Commendation Medal; Army Achievement Medal; National Defense Service Medal; Global War on Terrorism Service Medal; Army Good Conduct Medal; Overseas Service Ribbon; Army Service Ribbon

Victor Manuel Agosto (born May 13, 1985) is an American anti-war activist and a former United States Army private. He is noted for his direct and public resistance to the War in Afghanistan as an active duty soldier.

== Background ==
Agosto was born in Miami, Florida, the son of a Honduran mother and a Puerto Rican father. He graduated from the School for Advanced Studies in 2003. Agosto then attended Miami-Dade College for two years before enlisting in the Army. He entered military service in August 2005.

Agosto deployed to Iraq from September 2006 to October 2007, working as a communications specialist. It was during this deployment, through a process of "self-education," that Agosto came to oppose the wars in Iraq and Afghanistan. Agosto says he "never felt any danger" during his deployment and "never left the FOB." In the last months of the deployment, Agosto began to have strong feelings of guilt over his involvement in an "imperialist occupation." In April 2008, months after returning from Iraq, Agosto became a member of Iraq Veterans Against the War.

== Stop-loss and defiance ==
Agosto's Estimated Termination of Service (ETS) date was August 3, 2009, but he was stop-lossed in early 2009 so he could deploy with his unit to Afghanistan. On April 30, he informed his company commander that he would not deploy to Afghanistan. The following day, May 1, the commander gave Agosto a counseling statement in which he ordered Agosto to deploy with his unit. In the remarks section of that document, Agosto wrote, "There is no way I will deploy to Afghanistan. The occupation is immoral and unjust. It does not make the American people any safer. It has the opposite effect." He then posted a scanned copy of the counseling statement on his Facebook page. Agosto's refusal to deploy did not yield any immediate consequences. Agosto grew frustrated with assisting his unit prepare for the deployment that he morally opposed. On May 11, he told his company commander that he would not obey any orders he felt assisted his unit in preparation for the deployment. On May 18, Agosto's unit was slated to begin Soldier Readiness Processing (SRP), and he refused to go through that process. He would later be charged with refusing to obey a lawful order for this incident.

== Court-martial ==
Agosto was court-martialed on August 5, 2009. He pleaded guilty to the charge of disobeying a lawful order. During the sentencing phase of the proceedings, Agosto stated that he thought future courts would rule that the war in Afghanistan is illegal. He submitted a petition with the signatures of more than 2,000 people. Agosto also submitted a letter of support from Noam Chomsky, whose book, Hegemony or Survival: America's Quest for Global Dominance, turned Agosto against "imperialist foreign policy." He was demoted to the rank of Private, stripped of two thirds of his pay for a month, and sentenced to thirty days in jail. After his sentence was read, Agosto disdainfully ripped off the patch that displayed his specialist rank from his uniform. Agosto was released from Bell County Law Enforcement Center on August 29, 2009, after serving 24 days.

== After release from jail ==
Agosto was discharged from the Army on October 20, 2009 and was barred from re-entering the Fort Hood Military Reservation. His discharge was characterized as "other than honorable." He served a term on the board of directors of Iraq Veterans Against the War. He has served on the board of directors of Fort Hood Support Network, the governing body for Under the Hood Café in Killeen, Texas. He was a Sociology/Anthropology major at Florida International University. He then served a one-year term as a Co-Chairperson of the Green Party of Broward County.

== See also ==
- Camilo Mejia
- Ehren Watada
