= David Zeiger =

American film director, writer and producer

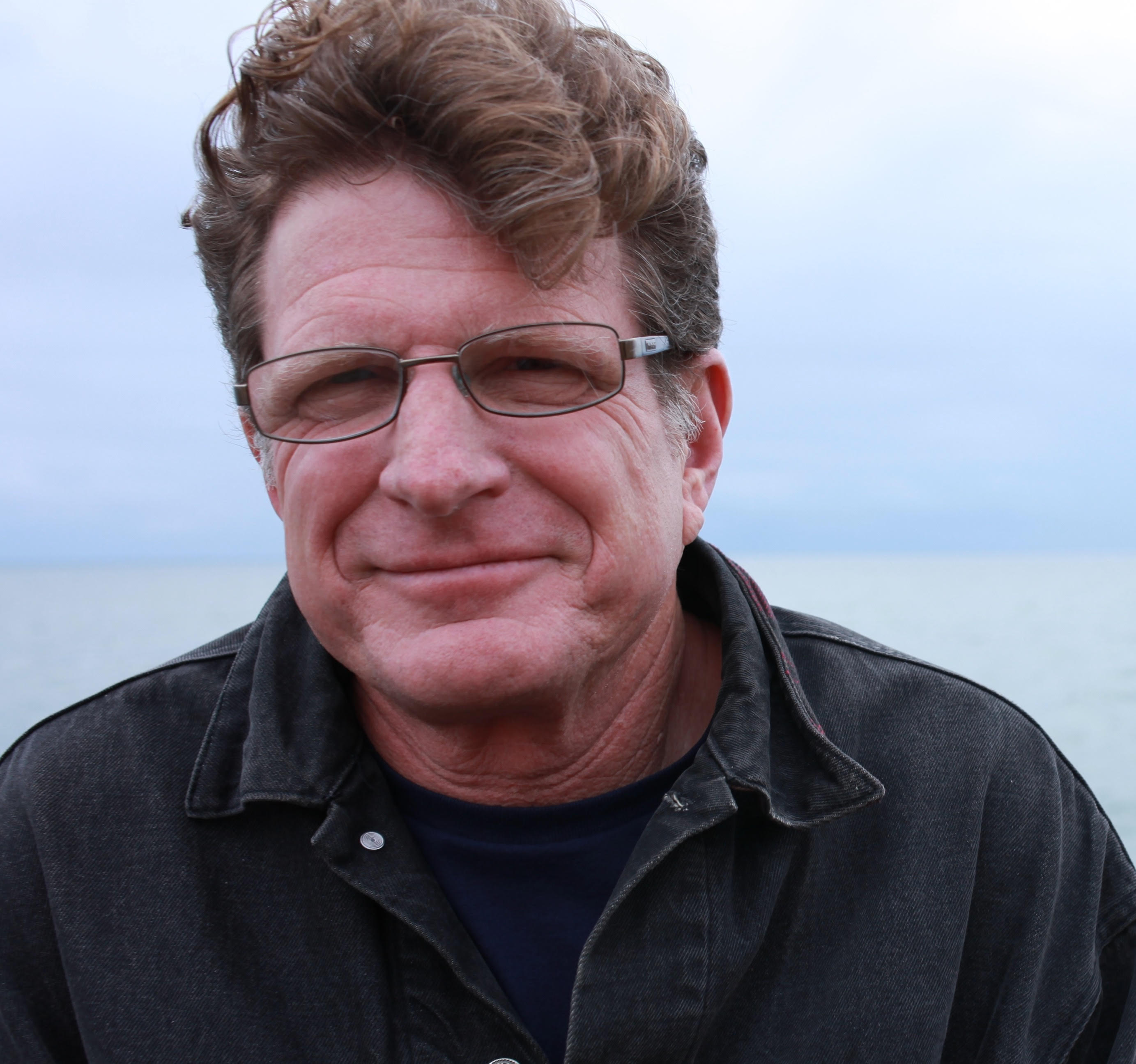
- Born: 1950 (age 75–76); Los Angeles, CA
- Occupations: Film director, producer, writer, photographer
- Spouse: Maryann Nielsen

David Zeiger is an American film director, writer and producer. He is most well known for the documentary Sir! No Sir! (2005), which is the only full-length film chronicling the extensive antiwar and resistance activity of U.S. troops during the Vietnam War; and for Senior Year (2002), a 13-part PBS documentary series about the senior year of a group of students at Fairfax High, the most diverse school in Los Angeles.

== Early life and political activism ==
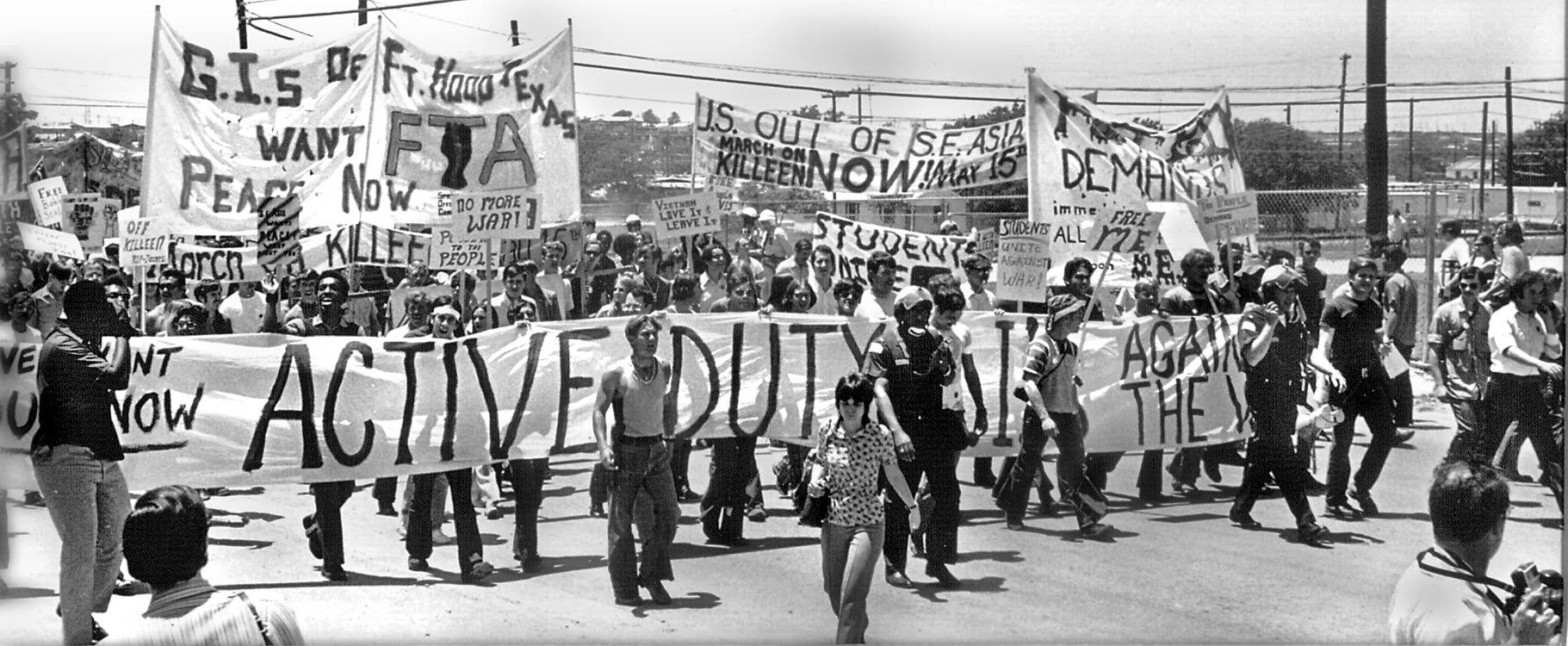
1971 Armed Forces Day antiwar demonstration at Ft Hood Army base

Zeiger was born in Los Angeles in 1950 to Irving and Beatrice Zeiger. He graduated from Fairfax High School in Los Angeles and started attending college. Then in the late 1960s, along with many other young people of that generation, dropped out to become involved in the anti-Vietnam War movement. In a 2005 comment he told Stoney Roads Films, "nothing was more important than joining the fight to end the Vietnam War." He started looking around for ways to participate and found a group of veterans and civilians in Killeen, Texas near the Fort Hood Army base who had begun supporting soldiers who were against the war or resisting the military or both.

Zeiger felt that organizing and supporting dissident GIs would be an effective way to oppose the war itself. These were the guys being sent to fight the war and Fort Hood was a major staging ground for troops heading to the war zone. It was also where many returned after their tours. "These were mostly working class guys," Zeiger told Mother Jones magazine, they "had gone into the military out of patriotic motives or because that was just what you did. And they were becoming one of the strongest forces against the war." He worked at the Oleo Strut GI Coffeehouse in Killeen and for the next two years found himself "in the heart of one of the most intense, exciting, and inspiring movements of the 1960s." He helped resisting soldiers put out their own underground GI newspaper called Fatigue Press, organize demonstrations of over 1,000 GIs against the war and the military, and turn "the Oleo Strut into one of Texas's anti-war headquarters."

== Photography and first film ==
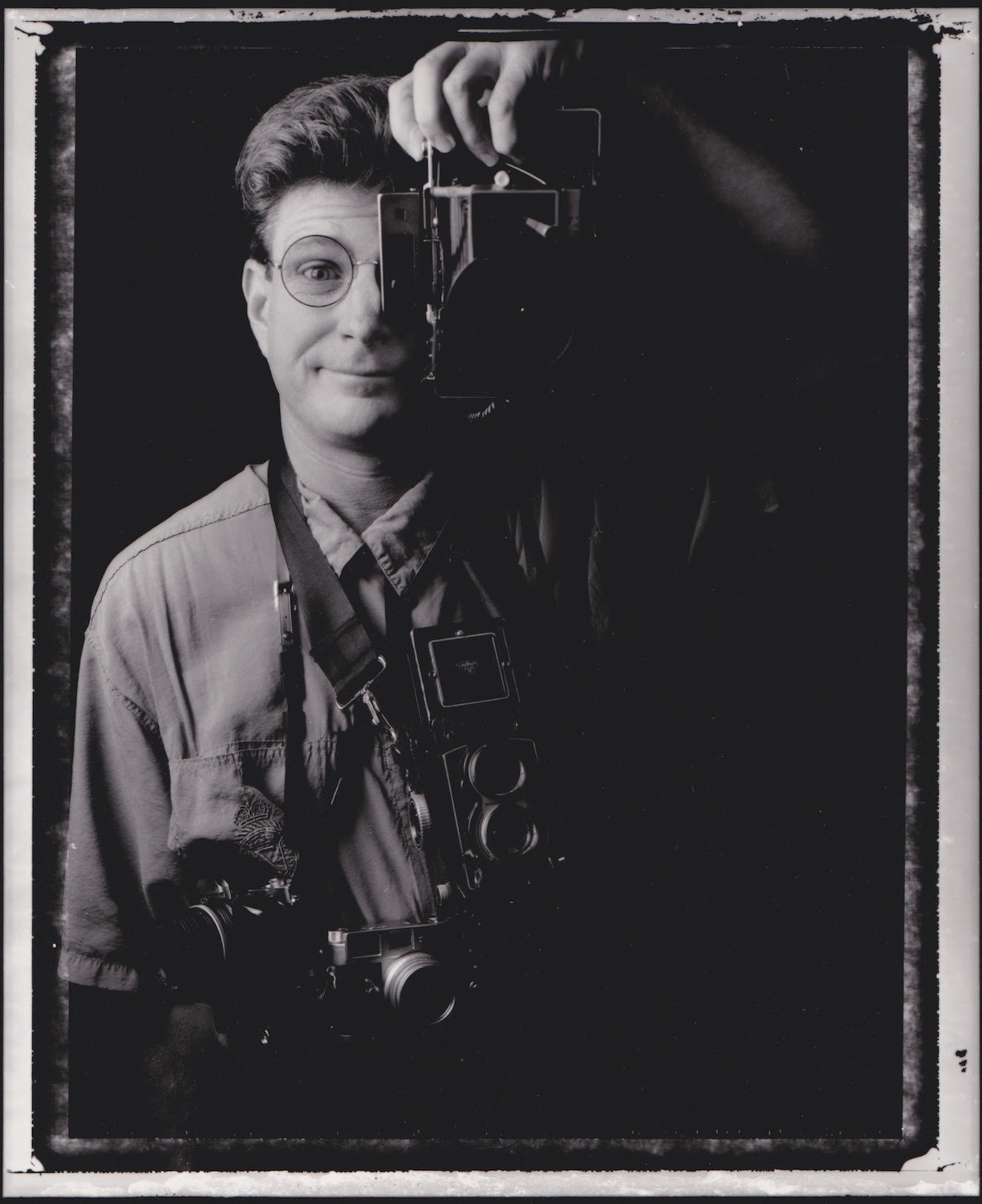
David Zeiger Self Portrait taken in the 1990s

By the late 1980s Zeiger was living in Atlanta, Georgia where he started taking pictures of local theater productions in a style reminiscent of Max Waldman. By the mid-1990 he had become "the premier theater photographer in Atlanta" and worked as the staff photographer for a number of local theaters, museums and Atlanta magazine. Over time he became interested in documentary photography and when a large influx of Mexican and Southeast Asian immigrants entered Atlanta, he developed relationships with and photographed their growing communities. This resulted in a "highly regarded" photography exhibit Displaced in the New South which toured throughout the Southern U.S. Photos from the exhibit were published in several magazines.

Zeiger felt what he had learned and experienced could be even better explored through film, so he raised money and proceeded to direct and produce his first film, Displaced in the New South. Released in 1996, the film was broadcast on PBS and the Discovery Channel International and shown at a number of film festivals, beginning his career in film. During this period, Zeiger founded his own production company, Displaced Films.

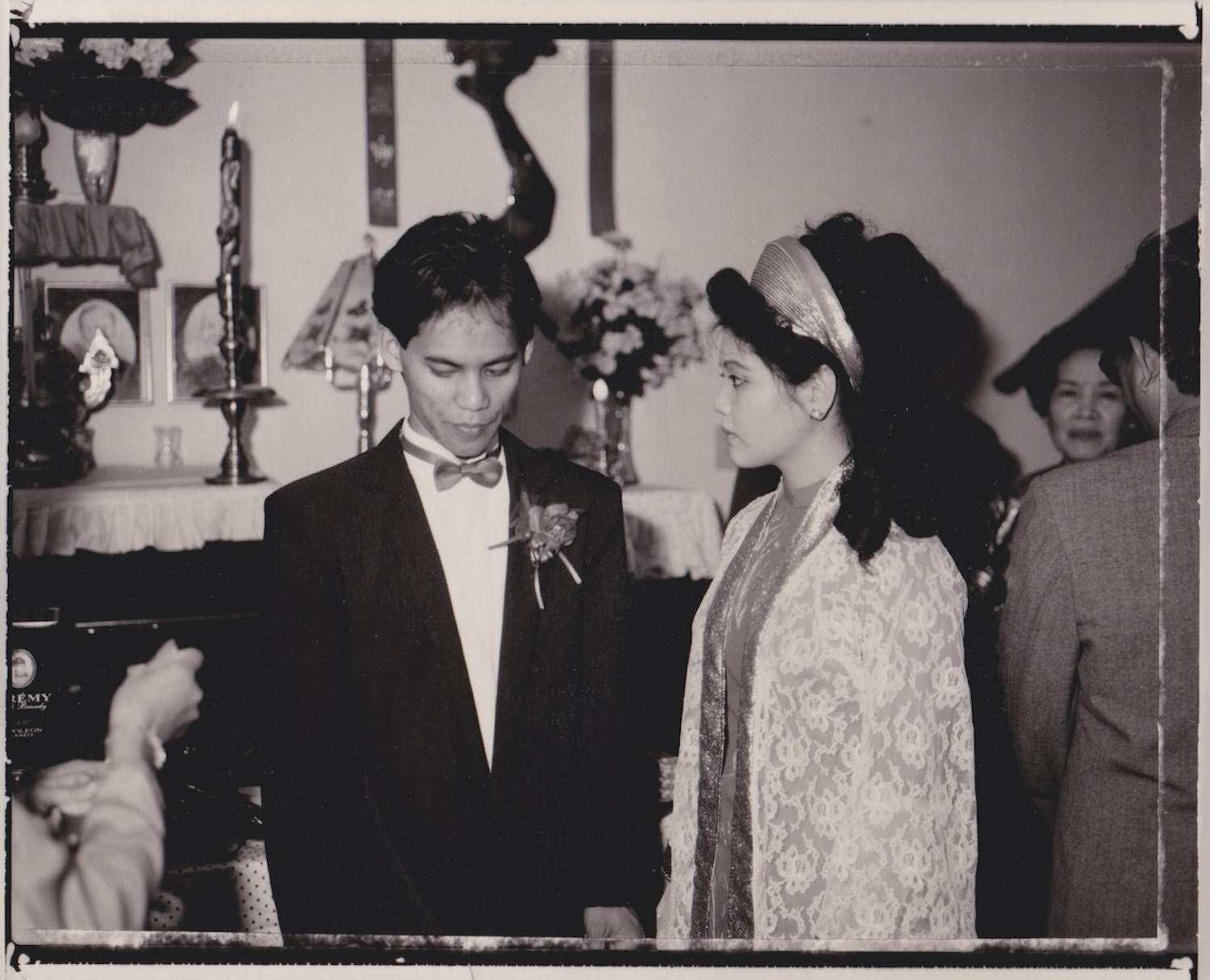
Zeiger Photo: Vietnamese wedding in Chamblee, GA, 1990s

== Films ==
=== Displaced in the New South ===
Displaced in the New South is a 54-minute documentary exploring the complex collision between Asian and Hispanic immigrants moving into suburban neighborhoods near Atlanta. Because Zeiger had deeply immersed himself in the immigrant communities, he was able bridge cultural differences and tell the story from their point of view. He partnered with documentary filmmaker Eric Mofford who co-directed and co-produced the film with him. One reviewer called it "The best treatment of the emerging ethnic and cultural complexity of the 'New South' that I have seen." Berkeley Media described the film as an "insightful case study of a widespread trend that is bringing explosive political upheaval all across America: waves of people, mostly from Asia and Latin America, coming to cities, small towns, and suburban communities that have never before experienced immigration on such a scale." It premiered on PBS in 1996 and was broadcast on the Discovery Channel International, NBC Asia and SBS-TV Australia in 1997. It was screened at the Chicago Latino, Cine Acción Latino, South by Southwest, Doubletake and San Francisco Asian American Film Festivals and won numerous awards. It was the inspiration for The Indigo Girls song Shame on You featured on their 1997 album, Shaming of the Sun.

=== The Band ===
After finishing Displaced..., Zeiger was looking for a new project when he discovered his 16-year-old son Danny was in love and saw him dance for the first time. He realized "a whole new person was emerging." Zeiger had lost his first son, Danny's older brother Michael, 9 years earlier — an event that had profoundly impacted both of them — and he felt compelled to chronicle his other son's junior year in high school. Zeiger admitted later that this was "Not exactly the most opportune time in a teenager's life for his father to show up at school with a camera." The result was The Band which was released in 1998. It premiered on the PBS series P.O.V. and was also shown on the French/German network ARTE. It was presented at the International Documentary Film Festival Amsterdam and American Film Institute Film Festival in Los Angeles, and was awarded "Best of Show" at the Central Florida Film Festival. Milwaukee Journal Sentinel called it "Interesting, inspiring, and purely entertaining." TV Guide praised its "Astonishing candor", and another reviewer said it "accomplished the impossible. It's made high school band look cool, fun and important."

=== Senior Year ===
In 1999, Zeiger returned to his roots and began work on his next project about his own alma mater, Fairfax High School in Los Angeles. By this time, it had become "the most diverse high school in Los Angeles". Zeiger explained the transition since he graduated, "it had evolved from a white, middle class, primarily Jewish school with a reputation for sending lots of kids to the Ivy League (myself not included), into a wildly diverse, exciting campus with students from over thirty different countries and just about every walk of life". He spent a semester at the school finding students who would be in the film and then hired a group of young filmmakers from the UCLA and University of Southern California film schools to spend the 1999/2000 school year filming. After 9 months, production was completed on graduation day in June 2000, and the result was Senior Year, a 13-part series, which was first broadcast in the U.S. on PBS in January 2002. It was also shown in Europe on Planète+ and was a premiere series on the U.S. English/Spanish cable network Sí TV in 2004. Entertainment Weekly commented, "Others have tried to document high school life, but this 13-part series succeeds where those drier efforts failed. High school is a time for experimentation, and finally, a truly experimental filmmaker is there."

=== Funny Old Guys ===
Zeiger's next documentary, which premiered in August 2002 at the Museum of Television and Radio (now the Paley Center for Media) in Los Angeles, was Funny Old Guys. A year later it appeared as part of the HBO documentary series Still Kicking, Still Laughing. It's about a group of writers and producers from TVs early days who gathered weekly at a Los Angeles tennis club to reminisce, crack jokes and tell stories. It centers on the final months of Frank Tarloff, a formerly blacklisted Academy Award-winning writer, as he and his friends confront his imminent death. His friends include Bernie West — principal writer for All in the Family and creator of The Jeffersons and Three's Company; Fred Freiberger — one of the original creators of Star Trek; Michael Morris — who wrote over 200 scripts for comedy shows from The Andy Griffith Show to All In The Family; and Bernie Kahn — who wrote for My Favorite Martian, Bewitched and many other shows.

=== A Night of Ferocious Joy ===
A Night of Ferocious Joy is a film documenting the first antiwar concert after the September 11, 2001 attacks. On Mother's Day, May 12, 2002, in opposition to the intensifying war on Afghanistan and growing preparations for another war in Iraq, a group of Hip-Hop, Latin Funk, Spoken Word and Visual Artists came together in a performance called ArtSpeaks! Not In Our Name. A sold-out crowd at the Palace Theater in Los Angeles watched performances by Ozomatli, The Coup, Blackalicious, Dilated Peoples, Mystic, Saul Williams, the Pan Afrikan Peoples Arkestra, Jerry Quickley, Hassan Hakmoun, and dozens of other visual artists. Zeiger's film of the event premiered in 2003 at the International Documentary Film Festival Amsterdam and its U.S. festival premiere was at South by Southwest in 2004.

=== Sir! No Sir! ===
In 2005, Zeiger premiered his most well-known film, Sir! No Sir!, at the Los Angeles Film Festival where it won the Audience Award for Best Documentary. It was about "an almost-forgotten fact" — the anti-war movement and resistance within the ranks of the United States Armed Forces during the Vietnam War. The New York Times reviewer called it a "smart, timely documentary" that "remembers that war and the veterans whose struggles against it are too often forgotten." The film itself argues this history has been more erased than forgotten. Despite hundreds of films about the Vietnam War and its veterans, prior to Sir! No Sir!, the story of U.S. GI resistance to the war had never been told in film and it still holds that distinction.

Evangeline Griego co-produced the film with Zeiger and Peter Broderick was the Executive Producer. It was reviewed and praised in dozens of media outlets. The Film Independent website reported that it "garnered rave reviews during its 80-city theatrical run, including 'Two Thumbs Up' from Ebert and Roeper". The Los Angeles Times called it a "powerful documentary", Newsday said, "Sir! No Sir! so vividly evokes the rage, passion and provocation of the era it chronicles that it feels up-to-the-minute", and another reviewer warned the U.S. government at the time that this was a "film that threatens the war movement with every showing, the Bush administration should outlaw it from all theatres within fifty miles of an armed forces recruiting station."

=== This Is Where We Take Our Stand ===
This Is Where We Take Our Stand debuted on Vimeo as a six-part web series in 2009 and then premiered as a 64-minute documentary on PBS in 2012. It tells the story of three of the 250 veterans and active duty soldiers who testified in March 2008 about their experiences during the U.S. occupations of Afghanistan and Iraq. Called a "riveting film" by the Washington Report on Middle East Affairs, it documents the transformation of U.S. soldiers from enthusiastic to disillusioned troops. One veteran testifies, "It really messed me up when I discovered I was on the bully's team. It's not what I signed up for".

=== Sweet Old World ===
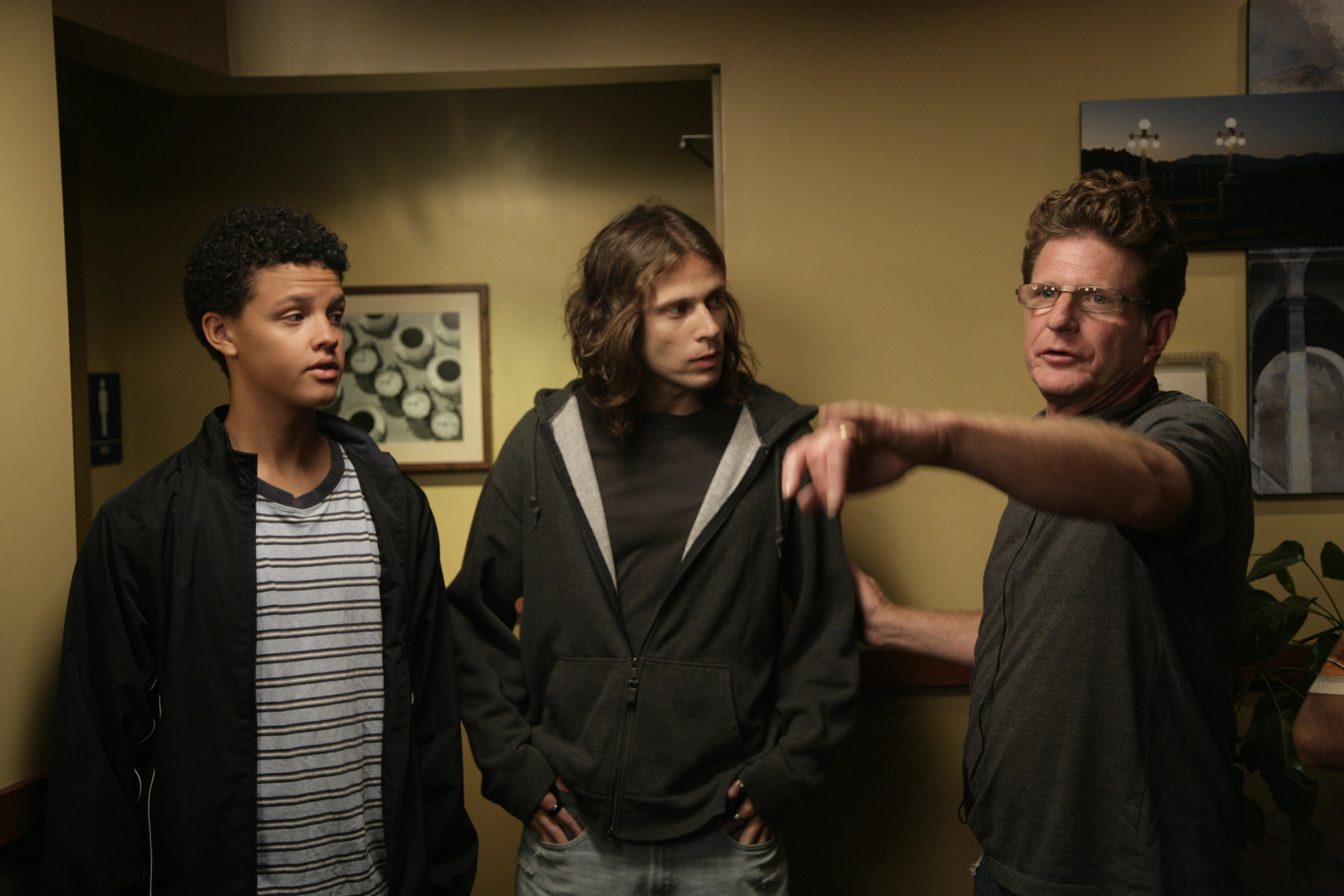
David Zeiger Directing Jacques Colimon & Eric Peter-Kaiser in Sweet Old World 2010

Sweet Old World, Zeiger's first non-documentary, is a drama released in 2012. Influenced by real-life events in his own family, it tells the story of a father and teenage son whose lives are shattered by the death of their son/brother in an accident. Zeiger received a Guggenheim Fellowship to make the film. Evangeline Griego co-produced the film with him. Shown at the Atlanta Film Festival, it was called an "expertly performed character piece" and praised for "the unblinking way it conveys familial loss and a renewed love between father and son that holds a ray of promise for their futures." The reviewer for The Atlanta Journal-Constitution said the film "shows a talented filmmaker thick in the middle of a brave period of transition."

=== Untold ===
Zeiger's next project brought him back to his documentary roots with Untold released in 2015. This is a deeply personal film telling the story of the harrowing sexual abuse of his teenage daughter at the hands of her high school boyfriend. Co-directed with his daughter, Leah Zeiger, it tells her story and her process of healing through dance. Her father wished he had not been able to make the film, "I would give anything for our daughter Leah to never have met that boy, for her to have had the idyllic teenage experience that dreams and myths tell us is out there. It isn't. What Leah went through, from start to finish, was a textbook case of abuse. Only problem is she never read the textbook. It's not in the curriculum for fifteen-year-old girls in this country. Or boys for that matter." It won the Audience Choice Award for Best Documentary at the Chicago Feminist Film Festival, and the Storytelling Award at DocYourWorld.

=== American Crime Series — Documentary Shorts ===
In 2020 and 2021 Zeiger created five short documentaries for the American Crime Case series produced by The Revcoms.

==== #12: The 1921 Tulsa Massacre and the Destruction of Black Wall Street ====
The first was called American Crime Case #12: The 1921 Tulsa Massacre and the Destruction of Black Wall Street. It documented the Tulsa race massacre (also called the Black Wall Street Massacre) which took place on May 31 and June 1, 1921, when mobs of white residents, many of them deputized and given weapons by city officials, attacked black residents and businesses of the Greenwood District in Tulsa, Oklahoma. It has been called "the single worst incident of racial violence in American history." The attack, carried out on the ground and from private aircraft, destroyed more than 35 square blocks of the district—at that time the wealthiest black community in the United States, known as "Black Wall Street".

==== #44: Trail of Tears ====
The second short documented the Trail of Tears, a series of forced relocations of approximately 60,000 Native Americans in the United States from their ancestral homelands in the Southeastern United States, to areas to the west of the Mississippi River that had been designated as Indian Territory. The forced relocations were carried out by government authorities following the passage of the Indian Removal Act in 1830. The approximately 60,000 relocated native peoples suffered from exposure, disease, and starvation while en route to their new designated reserve, and as many as 16,000 died before reaching their destinations or shortly after. The documentary quotes Andrew Jackson, who oversaw the initiation of the Trail of Tears on Native Americans: "They have neither the intelligence, the industry, the moral habits, nor the desire of improvement which are essential to any favorable change in their condition. Established in the midst of another and a superior race, and without appreciating the causes of their inferiority or seeking to control them, they must necessarily yield to the force of circumstances and ere long disappear."

==== #96: My Lai Massacre ====
Zeiger's My Lai Massacre documents the Vietnam War mass murder of unarmed South Vietnamese civilians by U.S. troops in Sơn Tịnh District, South Vietnam, on 16 March 1968. Between 347 and 504 unarmed people were killed by U.S. Army soldiers from Company C, 1st Battalion, 20th Infantry Regiment and Company B, 4th Battalion, 3rd Infantry Regiment, 11th Brigade, 23rd (Americal) Infantry Division. Victims included men, women, children, and infants. Some of the women were gang-raped and their bodies mutilated, as were children as young as 12. Twenty-six soldiers were charged with criminal offenses, but only Lieutenant William Calley Jr., a platoon leader in C Company, was convicted. Found guilty of killing 22 villagers, he was originally given a life sentence, but served only three and a half years under house arrest. Zeiger reveals what he calls a "secret" of the Vietnam War, that My Lai was not unusual for U.S. forces but actually routine. He quotes Army Specialist 5 Ronald L. Ridenhour, who wrote a letter in March 1969 to thirty members of Congress imploring them to investigate the massacre, as saying "this was an operation, not an aberration."

==== Unnumbered: Donald Trump Says We Need "Patriotic Education" ====
Zeiger next turned his attention to Donald Trump's efforts to perpetuate the many myths about America through what Trump called "patriotic education".

==== #71: The Colfax Massacre ====
For issue number 71 in this series, Zeiger examined the little known Easter Sunday, April 13, 1873, mass slaughter of Black people that took place in Colfax, Louisiana.

=== Trailers from Hell ===
Since 2021, Zeiger has been contributing to Trailers from Hell, the web series in which filmmakers discuss movies through commenting on their trailers. He has commented on Spring Forward, You're a Big Boy Now, Crazy Heart, The Loneliness of the Long Distance Runner, The Story of a Three-Day Pass, The Border, ...And Justice for All, Box of Moonlight, Living in Oblivion and Our Song.

== Filmography ==
| Year | Film | Director | Writer | Producer | Notes |
|---|---|---|---|---|---|
| 1996 | Displaced in the New South | ✓ | ✓ | ✓ | Documentary |
| 1998 | The Band | ✓ | ✓ | ✓ | Documentary |
| 2002 | Senior Year | ✓ | ✓ | ✓ | TV series documentary |
| 2003 | A Night of Ferocious Joy | ✓ | ✓ | ✓ | Documentary |
| 2003 | Funny Old Guys | ✓ | ✓ | ✓ | Documentary |
| 2005 | Sir! No Sir! | ✓ | ✓ | ✓ | Documentary |
| 2012 | This Is Where We Take Our Stand | ✓ | ✓ | ✓ | Documentary |
| 2012 | Sweet Old World | ✓ | ✓ | ✓ | Feature Film |
| 2015 | Untold | ✓ | ✓ | ✓ | Documentary |
| 2020 | American Crime Case #12: The 1921 Tulsa Massacre and the Destruction of Black Wall Street | ✓ | ✓ | ✓ | Documentary Short |
| 2020 | American Crime Case #44: Trail of Tears | ✓ | ✓ | ✓ | Documentary Short |
| 2020 | American Crime Case #96: My Lai Massacre | ✓ | ✓ | ✓ | Documentary Short |
| 2020 | American Crime: Patriotic Education | ✓ | ✓ | ✓ | Documentary Short |
| 2021 | American Crime Case #71: The Colfax Massacre | ✓ | ✓ | ✓ | Documentary Short |
