= Under the Hood Café =

Coffee house in Texas,America

Coordinates: 31.1188°N 97.7336°W

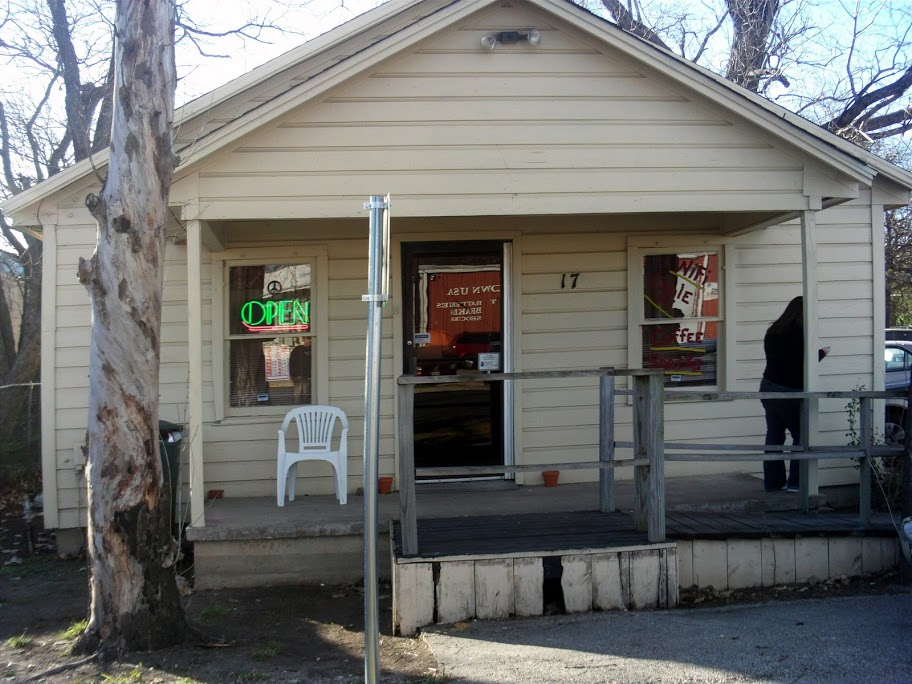
Photo from grand opening of Under the Hood Cafe

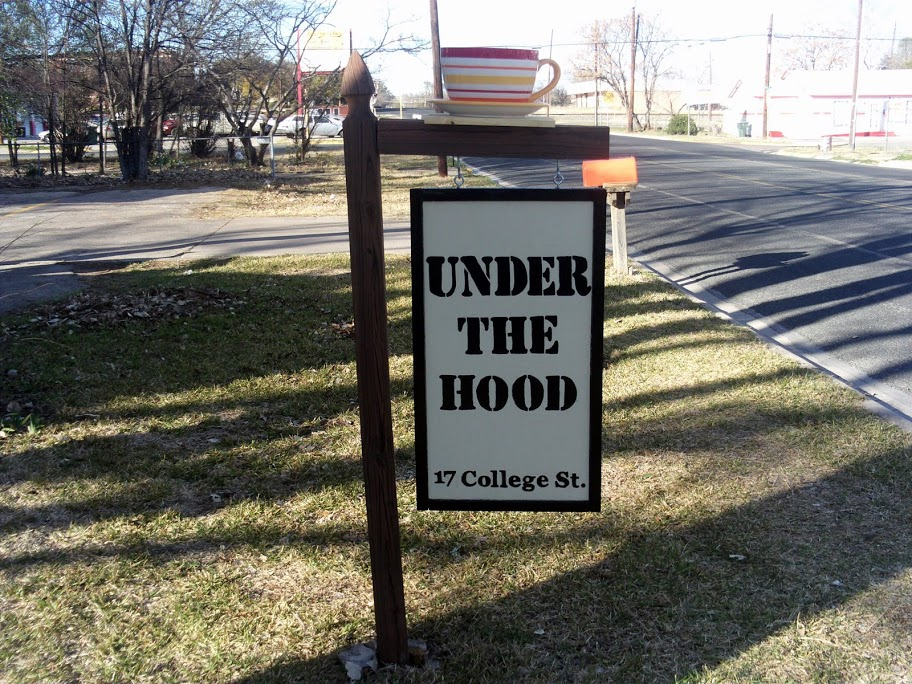

Under the Hood Café was a coffee house located at 17 South College Street in Killeen, Texas. It provided services for soldiers located at Fort Hood, one of the largest American military installations in the world. Under the Hood Café was first managed by Cynthia Thomas, but later managers were Kyle Wesolowski, Lori Hurlebaus and Malachi Muncy. Under the Hood is a project of the Fort Hood Support Network. It billed itself as being a safe place for local soldiers to spend off-duty time at, where the normal issues of rank are irrelevant. It was also the host of the monthly Killeen Poetry Slam.

The coffeehouse closed its doors in 2015.

== Anti-war activities ==
Under the Hood Cafe described itself as being part of the tradition of The Oleo Strut, a famous GI coffee house during the Vietnam war. The cafe continued in this tradition by hosting the Fort Hood chapter of Iraq Veterans Against the War, which held its meetings at Under the Hood. In 2009, the coffeehouse was the staging area for the first anti-war marches in Killeen since the Vietnam War. It also provided support for two war resisters, Victor Agosto and Travis Bishop, in their public campaigns against the War in Afghanistan. The cafe was also outspoken in encouraging combat veterans to be tested and treated for TBI (traumatic brain injury), and PTSD (post-traumatic stress disorder)

In August 2010 members of the IVAW took part in protesting the deployment of the 3rd ACR as the troops were leaving for Iraq. During the protest at least one person tried to stand in front of the buses carrying the troops.

== Response to Fort Hood shootings ==
On November 6, 2009, the Fort Hood chapter of IVAW and the Under the Hood Cafe issued a joint statement in response to the Fort Hood shooting, which reads in part:

Our community is distraught by the tragic shooting at Fort Hood yesterday. We extend our condolences to the families and friends of the victims.

As upset as we are about this incident, this shooting does not come as a shock. Eight years of senseless wars have taken a huge toll on our troops and their families. It's time to admit that the wars in southwest Asia are in no one's best interests. Bring the troops home now!

The Army has also repeatedly demonstrated that it is more interested in making soldiers "deployable" than it is in helping them fully recover from PTSD and other mental health issues. This often leaves soldiers with few options other than to self-medicate with drugs and alcohol. The Army routinely deploys soldiers who are clearly suicidal and homicidal. Yesterday was a gruesome reminder of the possible violent consequences of this policy. We hope the Army now takes its duty to take care of soldiers more seriously.

We demand transparency from the Army and other federal agencies involved with this investigation.

Major Nidal Malik Hasan, a soldier who had not deployed to Iraq, Afghanistan or any combat zone, was later convicted of the shootings.

== See also ==
- Coffee Strong
- GI Coffeehouses
