= Oleo Strut (coffeehouse) =

Coffeehouse in Texas, United States

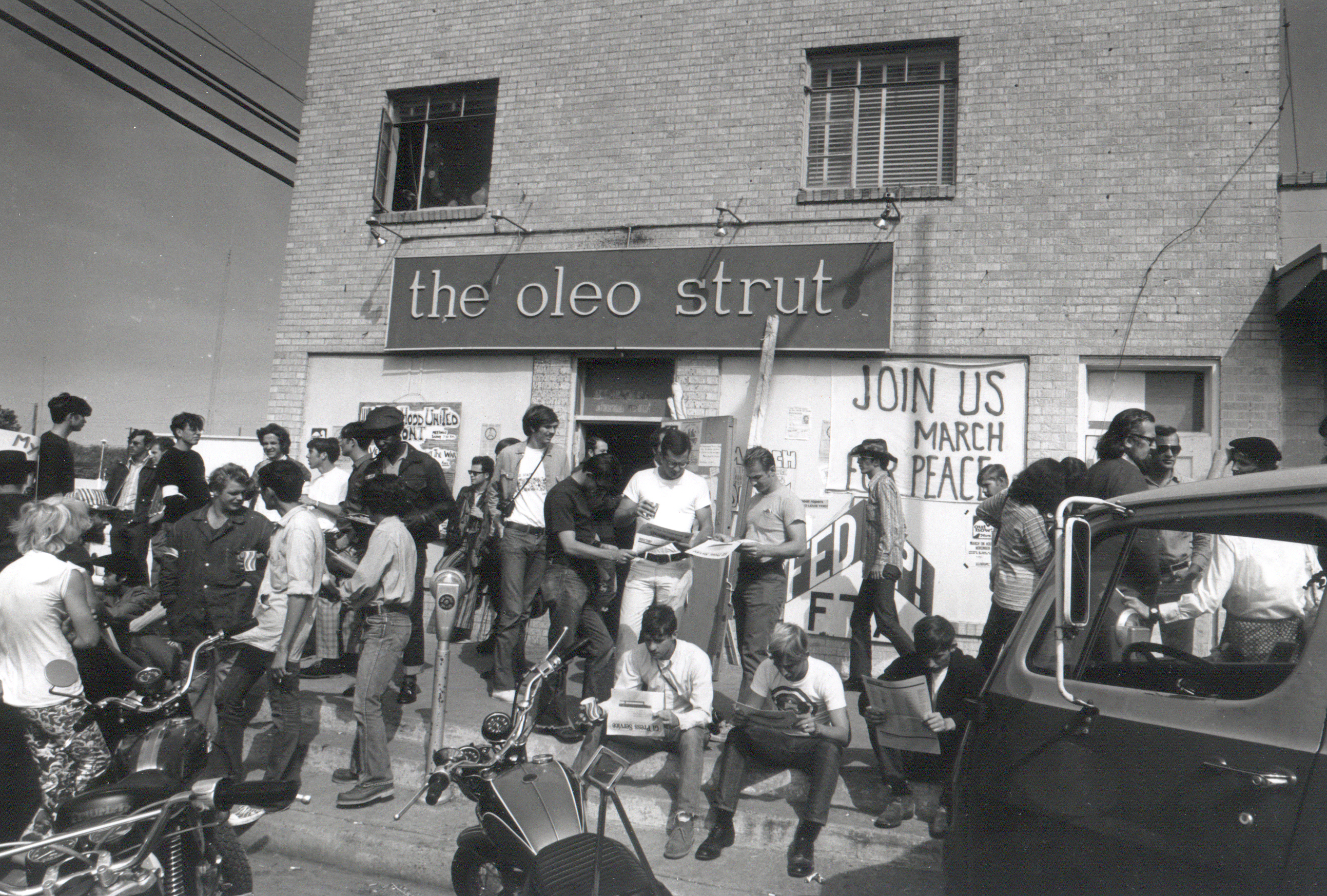
The Oleo Strut anti-war GI coffeehouse in 1971. Photo by Alan Pogue

The Oleo Strut was a GI coffeehouse located in Killeen, Texas, from 1968 to 1972. Like its namesake, a shock absorber in the landing gear of most large aircraft and many smaller ones, the Oleo Strut’s purpose was to help GIs land softly. Upon returning from Vietnam to Fort Hood, shell-shocked soldiers found solace amongst the Strut’s regulars, mostly fellow soldiers and a few civilian sympathizers. The GIs turned the Oleo Strut into one of Texas’s anti-war headquarters, publishing an underground anti-war newspaper, organizing boycotts, setting up a legal office, and leading peace marches.

The coffeehouse was an organizing center for the support of the Fort Hood 43, a group of Black soldiers who had been disciplined for refusing to perform riot control duty at the Democratic National Convention in Chicago.

== See also ==
- GI Coffeehouses
- Under the Hood Café
- Sir! No Sir!
