= Max Waldman =

American photographer (1919–1981)

Max Waldman (1919–1981) was an American dance and theater photographer.

He was also known for his dramatic shots on a great range of subjects from football players to immigrants.

== Career ==
Waldman became best known for his portraits of ballet dancers, including Mikhail Baryshnikov and Natalia Makarova through his books, including Waldman on Theater and Waldman on Dance. Contemporary photographers such as Daniel Nicoletta were influenced by Waldman.

His photographs were exhibited in group and one-man shows in a variety of venues, including the New York Public Library, the La Jolla Museum of Art, and the Rose Museum of Brandeis University. Waldman's work is also found as part of private and public collections, including the Metropolitan Museum of Art in New York City, and the George Eastman House.
