= Sir! No Sir! =

2005 film about anti-Vietnam War soldiers and sailors

- Promotional movie poster for the film
- Directed by: David Zeiger
- Written by: David Zeiger
- Produced by: Evangeline Griego; Aaron Zarrow; David Zeiger
- Starring: Donald Sutherland; Jane Fonda; Greg Payton; David Cline; Keith Mather; Dr. Howard Levy; Susan Schnall; Terry Whitmore
- Narrated by: Troy Garity
- Cinematography: May Rigler; David Zeiger
- Edited by: Lindsay Mofford; May Rigler
- Music by: Buddy Judge
- Distributed by: Balcony Releasing
- Release date: June 19, 2005 (Los Angeles Film Festival)
- Running time: 85 minutes
- Country: United States
- Language: English

Sir! No Sir! is a 2005 documentary by Displaced Films about the anti-war movement within the ranks of the United States Armed Forces during the Vietnam War. The film was produced, directed, and written by David Zeiger. The film had a theatrical run in 80 cities throughout the U.S. and Canada in 2006, and was broadcast worldwide on Sundance Channel, Discovery Channel, BBC, ARTE France, ABC Australia, SBC Spain, ZDF Germany, YLE Finland, RT, and several others.

== Synopsis ==
Sir! No Sir! tells for the first time on film the story of the 1960s GI movement against the war in Vietnam. The film explores the profound impact that the movement had on the war, and investigates the way in which the GI Movement has been erased from public memory.

In the 1960s an anti-war movement emerged that altered the course of history. This movement didn't take place on college campuses, but in barracks and on aircraft carriers. It flourished in army stockades, navy brigs and in the dingy towns that surround military bases. It penetrated elite military colleges like West Point. And it spread throughout the battlefields of Vietnam. It was a movement no one expected, least of all those in it. Hundreds went to prison and thousands into exile. And by 1971 it had, in the words of one colonel, infested the entire armed services. Yet today few people know about the GI Movement against the war in Vietnam.

The review in the Boston Globe notes,

A Navy nurse was arrested after she flew a plane over military bases in San Francisco that dropped antiwar leaflets, two black soldiers were given eight to 10 years for attempting to organize a discussion group that asked whether black soldiers should be participating in the war, and hundreds of other soldiers were jailed for any number of reasons. Decades later, the veterans Zeiger talks to still seem completely astonished, shell-shocked as it were, by both the confusing scope of the war itself and by their ability to resist it.

== Footage ==
The film brings to life the history of the GI Movement and the stories of those who were part of it through interviews with veterans plus hitherto unseen archival material. Archival materials include news reports from local and national television broadcasts, images from newspapers and magazines, and Super-8 and 16mm film footage of events in the GI Movement shot by GIs and civilian activists. Recently shot interviews with individuals involved in the struggle include soldiers imprisoned for refusing to fight, to train other soldiers, or to ship out to the frontlines; Vietnam veterans who became antiwar activists or joined the 500,000+ soldiers whom the Pentagon listed as deserters during the war; the leader of the Presidio 27 Mutiny, also known as the Presidio mutiny; and soldiers who went on strike while in Vietnam, plus other interviews, including with Hollywood activist Jane Fonda. Exclusive footage from documentary coverage of the movement includes highlights from the FTA Show, Jane Fonda and Donald Sutherland's antiwar stage revue that traveled to military bases around the world, F.T.A. the feature-length film about that tour; Vietnam veterans hurling their medals onto the Capitol steps; the refusal by troops to engage in combat at Firebase Pace; and an audio recording made by the journalist Richard Boyle, who was also the author of The Flower of the Dragon and the Oliver Stone film Salvador.

== Historical overview ==
1965-1967: "A Few Malcontents"

As the Johnson administration turns what was initially a small "police action" into an all-out war and the peace movement begins, isolated individuals and small groups in the military refuse to participate and are severely punished: Lt. Henry Howe is sentenced to two years hard labor for attending an antiwar demonstration; the Fort Hood Three are sentenced to three years hard labor for refusing duty in Vietnam; Dr. Howard Levy, a military doctor, refuses to train Special Forces troops and is court-martialed as Donald W. Duncan, a celebrated member of the Green Berets, resigns after a year in Vietnam; and Corporal William Harvey and Private George Daniels are sentenced to up to 10 years in 1967 for meeting with other marines on Camp Pendleton to discuss whether Blacks should fight in Vietnam.

1968-1969: "We Thought The Revolution Was Starting."

The war escalates as the peace movement becomes an international mass movement, and soldiers begin forming organizations and taking collective action: The Ft. Hood 43, Black soldiers who refused riot-control duty at the 1968 Democratic National Convention, are sentenced for up to 18 months each; the largest military prison in Vietnam, Long Binh Jail (affectionately called LBJ by the troops), is taken over by Black soldiers who hold it for two months. The Presidio 27 – prisoners in the stockade on the Presidio Army Base in San Francisco – are charged with mutiny, a capital offense, when they refuse to work after a mentally ill prisoner is killed; underground newspapers published by antiwar GIs appear at almost every military base in the country; the American Serviceman's Union is formed; antiwar coffeehouses are established outside of military bases. In Vietnam, small combat - refusals occur and are quickly suppressed, but on Christmas Eve, 1969, 50 GIs participate in an illegal antiwar demonstration in Saigon. Vietnam Veterans Against the War (VVAW) is formed.

1970-1973: "Sir, My Men Refuse To Fight!"

Opposition to the war turns militant and the counter-culture rises to its peak: 92,000 soldiers were declared deserters, with tens of thousand fleeing to Canada, France and Sweden; thousands of soldiers organize and participate in Armed Forces Day demonstrations at 19 military bases on May 15, 1971; drug use is rampant and underground radio networks flourish in Vietnam as Black and white soldiers increasingly identify with the antiwar and Black liberation movements; combat refusals and fragging of officers in Vietnam are epidemic. Thousands are jailed for refusing to fight or simply defying military authority, and nearly every U.S. military prison in the world is hit by riots. Jane Fonda's antiwar revue, The FTA Show, tours military bases and is cheered by tens of thousands of soldiers; the Pentagon concludes that over half the ground troops openly oppose the war and shifts its combat strategy from a ground war to an air war; the Navy and Air Force are both riddled with mutinies and acts of sabotage. VVAW holds the Winter Soldier Investigation, exposing American war crimes through the testimony of veterans, and stages the most dramatic demonstration of the Vietnam era as hundreds of veterans hurl their medals onto the Capitol steps.

Coffee Houses.

Zeiger highlights the history of the coffee houses that sprang up near army bases where many of the activist meetings took place, including the Oleo Strut, where Zeiger worked as a teenager. "The GIs turned the Oleo Strut into one of Texas's anti-war headquarters, publishing an underground anti-war newspaper, organizing boycotts, setting up a legal office, and leading peace marches."

Epilogue: The Myth Of The Spitting Hippie.

As the U.S. military and its allies flee Vietnam in disarray in the spring of 1975, the government, the media, and Hollywood begin a 20-year process of erasing the GI Movement from the collective memory of the nation and the world. Ronald Reagan's "Resurgent America" campaign re-writes the history of Vietnam and erases the GI Movement; by 1990, over 100 theatrical films have been produced about the Vietnam War, none of which portray the GI Antiwar Movement or any opposition to the war by soldiers. The myth that antiwar activists routinely spat on returning soldiers is spread as part of the buildup to the 1990 Gulf War.

== Featured individuals and groups ==
- Greg Payton, an African-American, imprisoned at Long Binh Jail for refusing to fight, who was part of the uprising there
- Dave Cline, wounded three times in Vietnam and antiwar activist at Ft. Hood, the site of some of the staunchest resistance to the war and racism
- Keith Mather, jailed in the Presidio of San Francisco for publicly refusing orders to go to Vietnam and a leader of the Presidio mutiny
- Dr. Howard Levy, jailed three years for refusing to train Special Forces troops
- Navy nurse Susan Schnall, jailed for dropping leaflets from an airplane onto the Presidio army base
- Terry Whitmore, a highly decorated combat veteran who deserted to Sweden
- Members of "WORMS" (We Openly Resist Military Stupidity)
- Air Force linguists stationed in Asia who went on strike during the 1972 Christmas bombings of Hanoi and Haiphong.

== Awards ==
- Los Angeles Film Festival Audience Award, Best Documentary
- Full Frame Documentary Film Festival Seeds of War Award
- Hamptons Film Festival Jury Award, Golden Starfish for Best Documentary
- Vermont International Film Festival Jury Award, Best Film in Category: War and Peace
- Independent Spirit Awards Best Documentary Nominee Award
- Video Librarian's Best Documentaries of the Year List
- American Library Association's VRT Notable Videos for Adults List
- Independent Feature Project Nomination for a Gotham Award

== Reception ==
The film garnered critical acclaim and has an 89% rating on Rotten Tomatoes. Ebert & Roeper gave the film "Two Thumbs Up", and Richard Roeper proclaimed: "This is an important chapter in the Vietnam library of films." Manohla Dargis in the New York Times called it a "smart, timely documentary about the G.I. Movement" and praised it for serving "as a corrective to the rah-rah rhetoric about Vietnam in such schlock entertainments as the 1980's 'Rambo' franchise". The Los Angeles Times declared it "a powerful documentary that uncovers half-forgotten history, history that is still relevant but not in ways you might be expecting." For L.A. Weekly, Chuck Wilson wrote: "David Zeiger's superb documentary about the Vietnam War era's GI protest movement is jammed with incident and anecdote and moves with nearly as much breathless momentum as the movement itself." Jonathan Rosenbaum of the Chicago Reader wrote: "I expected to emerge depressed by how long these stories have gone untold, but the speakers' courage and humanity are a shot in the arm."

== See also ==
- Concerned Officers Movement
- Donald W. Duncan
- Fort Hood Three
- FTA Show - 1971 anti-Vietnam War road show for GIs
- F.T.A. - 1972 documentary film about the FTA Show
- GI's Against Fascism
- G.I. coffeehouses
- GI Underground Press
- Movement for a Democratic Military
- Myth of the spat-on Vietnam veteran
- Opposition to the Vietnam War
- Opposition to United States involvement in the Vietnam War
- Presidio mutiny
- Soldiers in Revolt: GI Resistance During the Vietnam War, book about soldier & sailor resistance during the Vietnam War
- Stop Our Ship (SOS) anti-Vietnam War movement in and around the U.S. Navy
- The Spitting Image - book dispelling the myth of the spat-on Vietnam veteran
- Vietnam Veterans Against the War
- Waging Peace in Vietnam
- Winter Soldier Investigation
