= GI Underground Press =

Military press produced without official approval

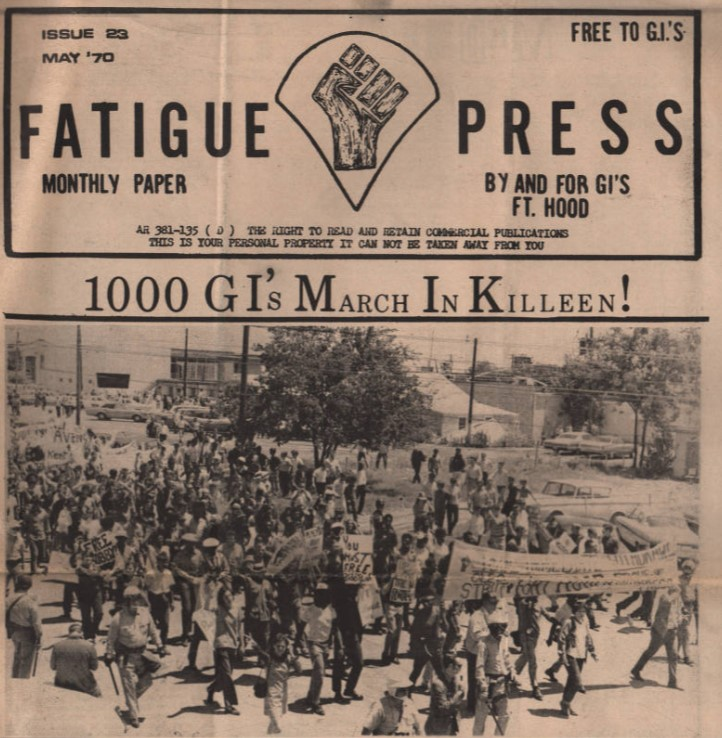
Fatigue Press Cover May 1970—1000 GIs march to protest the Vietnam War

The GI Underground Press was an underground press movement that emerged among the United States military during the Vietnam War. These were newspapers and newsletters produced without official military approval or acceptance; often furtively distributed under the eyes of "the brass". They were overwhelmingly antiwar and most were anti-military, which tended to infuriate the military command and often resulted in swift retaliation and punishment. Mainly written by rank-and-file active duty or recently discharged GIs, AWOLs and deserters, these publications were intended for their peers and spoke the language and aired the complaints of their audience. They became an integral and powerful element of the larger antiwar, radical and revolutionary movements during those years. This is a history largely ignored and even hidden in the retelling of the U.S. military's role in the Vietnam War.

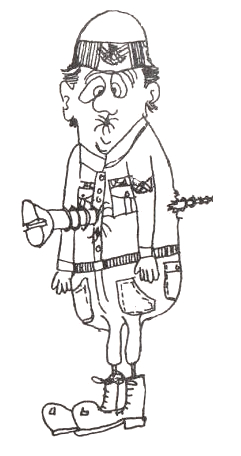
The Screwed GI, first published in Last Harass, was often reprinted in other papers

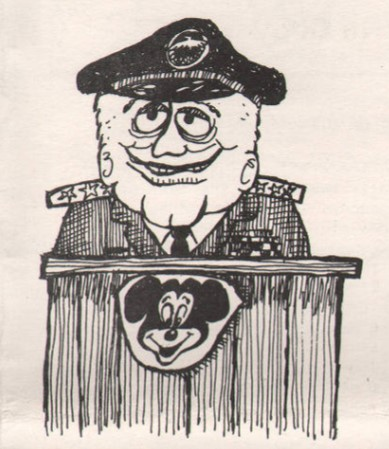
The Mickey Mouse General—A Four-Year Bummer Cover Oct-Nov 1969

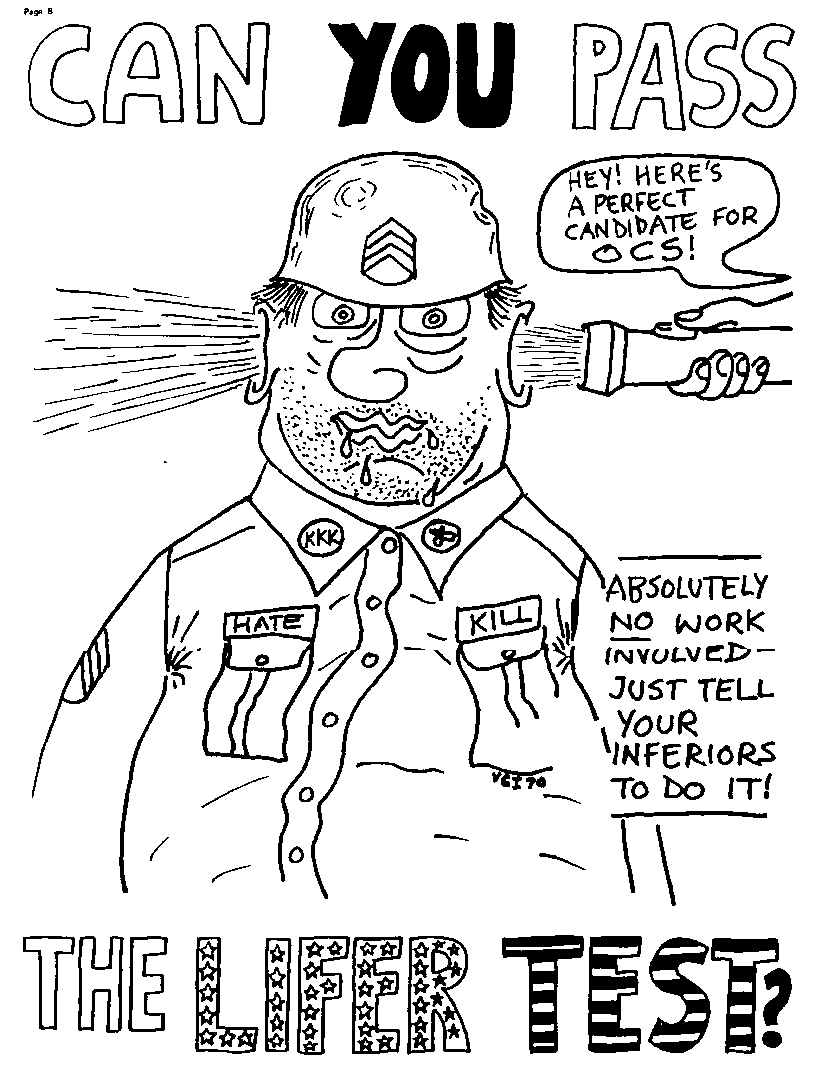
The Lifer Test from Vietnam GI May 1970

== Background ==
During the Vietnam War an unprecedented flowering of underground newspapers occurred throughout the U.S. and internationally. They became key platforms for antiwar, civil rights, black power and anti-establishment sentiment and politics at a time when the more established press would rarely carry these messages. During the same period, U.S. soldiers turned against the war and the military in increasing numbers and began producing their own underground press. In March 1969 the four U.S. military branches told the Senate Armed Services Subcommittee they had counted over 40,000 desertions during the 1967 fiscal year and over 53,000 in 1968. A 1971, then classified, internal report commissioned by the Pentagon reported that 58 percent of the Army enlisted men surveyed "cited the Vietnam War as the major cause of their dissident activities," with 38 percent complaining about "the way the Army treats the individual." Several military specialists were also sounding the alarm and warning about the possible collapse of the U.S. Armed Forces. In 1969 this phenomenon had become so evident it prompted the New York Times to comment, "a startling number of servicemen – some so sophisticated that they cite the Nuremberg trials as their guide – have decided to do their own thinking."

Inspired in part by some of the early and more well-known of the civilian underground papers, like the Los Angeles Free Press and the Berkeley Barb, which started in 1964 and 1965 respectively, the GI versions began to emerge shortly thereafter.

== Creative and rebellious ==
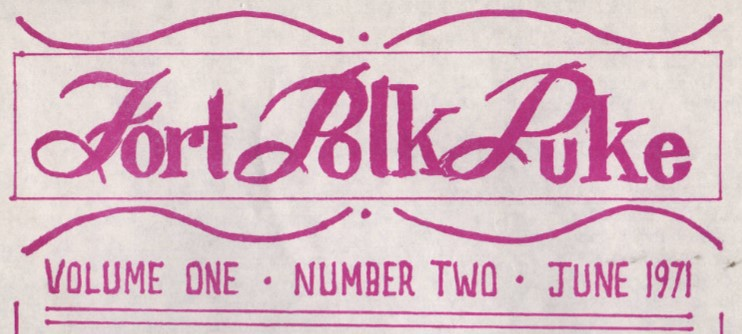
The underground newspaper at Fort Polk Army Base in Vernon Parish, Louisiana

The papers' names captured the GI attitudes of the times. They expressed emotions ranging from the slightly depressed Marine Blues, to the unhappy Fed Up at Fort Lewis, to the miserable A Four-Year Bummer out of Chanute Air Force Base, and even to the nauseated Fort Polk Puke. Then there was the anti-patriotic Star-Spangled Bummer at Wright-Patterson Air Force Base and the downright furious Fragging Action at Fort Dix, where fragging is the deliberate killing of fellow soldiers, usually officers, by other soldiers—perhaps the most extreme form of antiwar or anti-military anger. Others expressed existential angst like Why in Okinawa or anxiety with Up-Tight at Fort Bliss, while one out of the Long Beach Naval Shipyard warned about the future with Calm Before The Storm. There were also quite a few funny names like, the Hunley Hemorrhoid on the USS Hunley, Air Fowl at Vandenberg Air Force Base, the Stuffed Puffin at the Keflavik Naval Air Station in Iceland, Kitty Litter on the USS Kitty Hawk, Fat Albert's Death Ship Times at the Charleston Naval Base, Offul Times at Offutt Air Force Base, Cockroach at Minot Air Force Base, the Man Can't Win If Ya Grin in Okinawa, and the Chickenshit Weekly at Fort Bliss. Some turned military jargon against itself with names like Eyes Left at Travis Air Force Base, Left Face at Fort McClellan, Counter-Attack! at Fort Carson, All Hands Abandon Ship at the Newport Navy Base, About Face at Bergstrom Air Force Base, and Liberated Barracks in Hawaii. Not to mention Fun Travel Adventure or FTA at Fort Knox, which mocked an Army recruitment slogan and, more importantly for the soldiers, really meant "Fuck the Army".

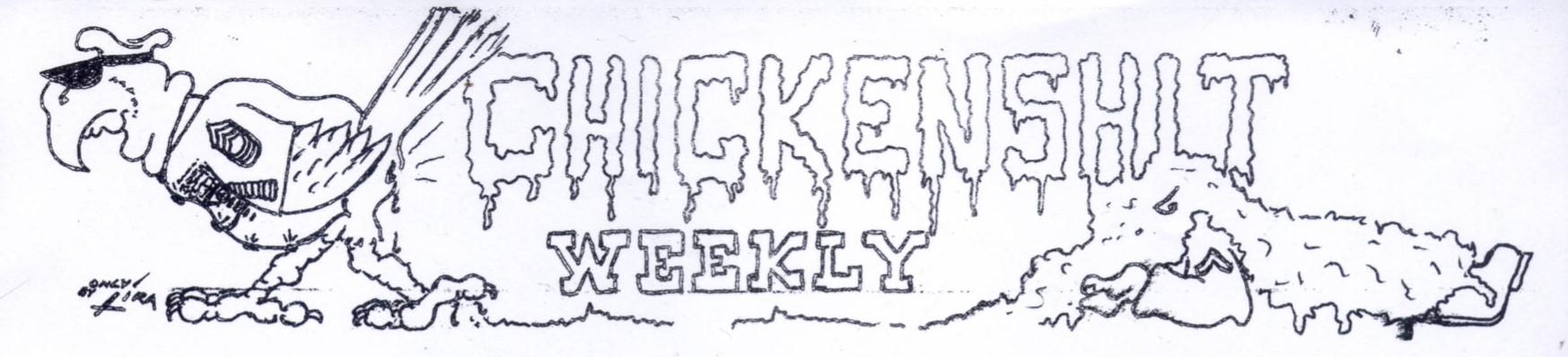
The underground newspaper at Fort Bliss in El Paso, Texas

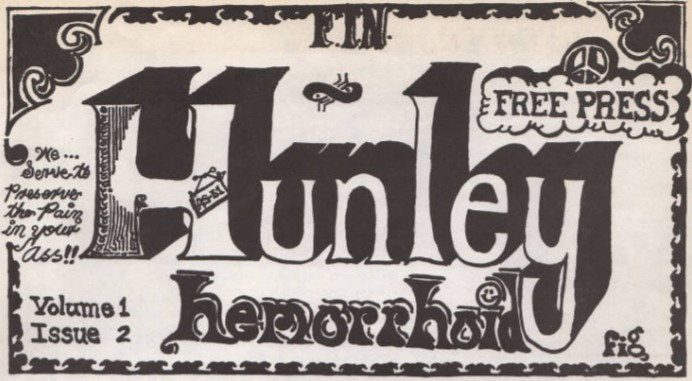
The underground newspaper on board the USS Hunley

These papers were filled with advice and opinions for the unhappy and questioning GI, cartoons and articles that mocked and criticized the war and the military, made fun of lifers, the brass and pro-war politicians, exposed and condemned racism (and even sexism) inside and outside the military, and contained information about where and how to protest, to get legal advice or to socialize with like minded GIs and civilians. Politically, the papers ran the gamut from liberal to revolutionary and from pacifist to turn-the-guns-around anger. There were papers for Black soldiers and sailors, for women in or connected to the military, and there was one known paper for Native American servicemen and women. There was even at least one rightwing unofficial paper. The New York Times described the best of them as "gabby, colorfully gripey, intelligently critical, and entertainingly scurrilous". Most of all, they were intended to connect the short-haired, often isolated GI to the larger worldwide counterculture, rebel movements and ethos of the times. What the military viewed as subversive and disloyal, many unhappy GIs saw as a lifeline. Nothing like this had ever happened before, nor since.

== Distribution ==
Underground publications could be found almost everywhere U.S. troops set foot. The papers were in Quonset huts in Vietnam, onboard aircraft carriers at sea, inside military transport aircraft, and on every major U.S. military installation from Fort Hood, Texas to Kodiak, Alaska to Subic Bay, Philippines to the Campbell Barracks in Germany. There was even one in the Pentagon. Often the same dog-eared paper would be read by dozens of GIs as it passed hand to hand under the noses of the lifers and the brass. They were mailed around the world, including in bundles disguised "to look like 'care packages' from families or church groups back home", which were then passed out in mess halls, mailrooms and barracks. They were distributed at major transportation hubs, like bus and train stations, where GIs passed through, and in antiwar G.I. coffeehouses that spread during the war. In many ways these publications became the lifeblood of the growing GI movement—they allowed isolated unhappy GIs to know they were not alone and to connect with and spread a message they agreed with. Through the papers they could read about antiwar protests and fellow GIs speaking out and feel encouraged or inspired to resist the war and the military. One of the most popular sections of most papers were the letters from fellow GIs. Here GIs could gripe and tell stories to each other. One researcher has compared these GI letters to the online social media of today, and the reverse is also true; what can be found online today, was only available to GIs through their underground press.

=== Frequency ===
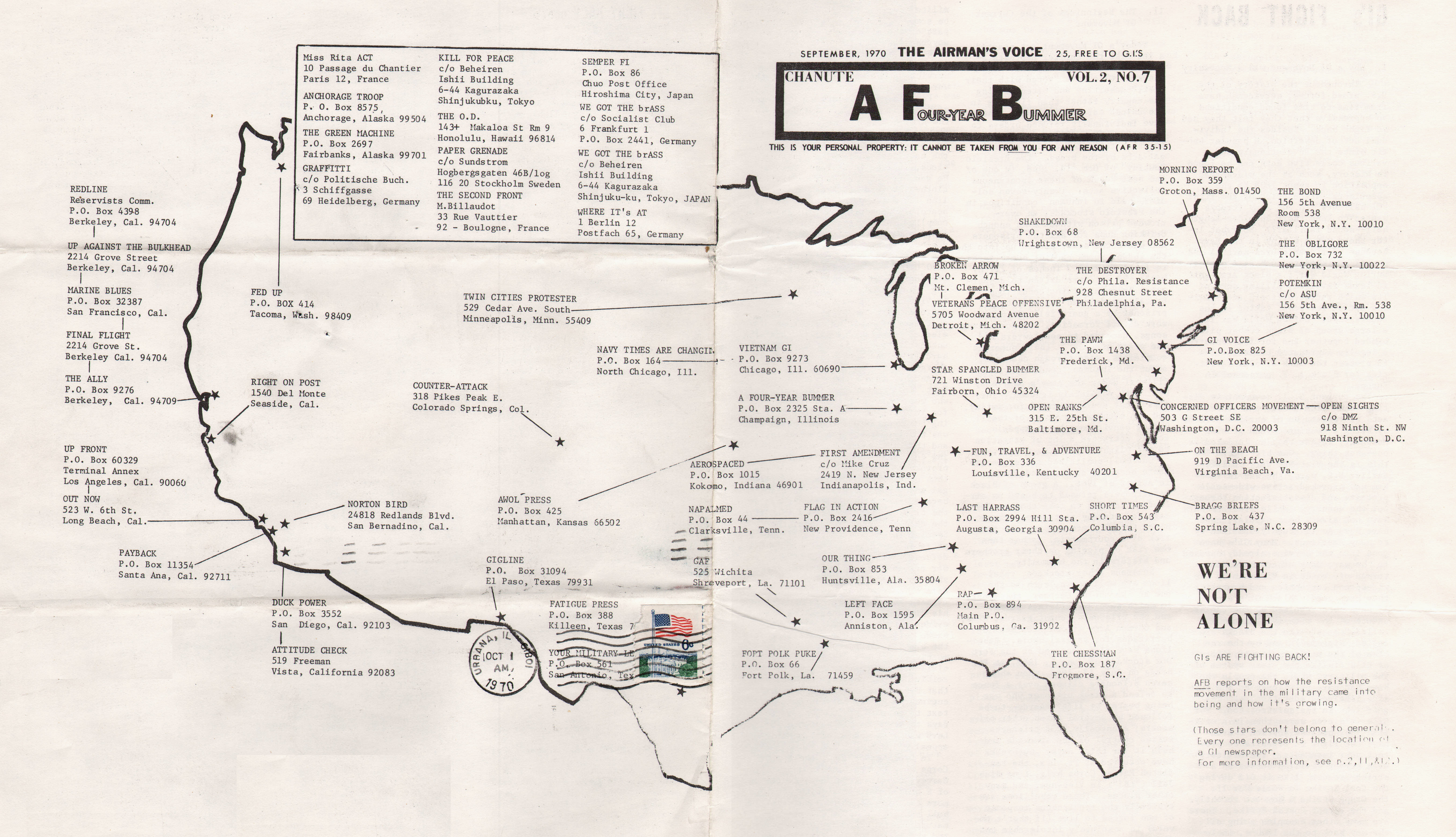
Map of GI Newspapers from A Four-Year Bummer September 1970

Because of their underground existence, the difficulties surrounding their production and publication, and the typically swift retaliation by the military on the responsible GIs, not to mention ambiguity around the exact definition of a newspaper; the total count of GI underground newspapers and publications during the Vietnam War is a matter of much scholarly debate. Towards the end of 1970, A Four-Year Bummer out of Chanute Air Force Base in Illinois printed a map of the publications they were aware of (see image). It shows 63 papers in the U.S. and Europe. In 1971, the Armed Forces Journal counted "some 144" and in March 1972 the Department of Defense estimated there had been 245 to date. David Cortright, the author of the most authoritative book on the GI resistance to the Vietnam War, Soldiers in Revolt, said the total newspaper count is "near three hundred", while others have estimated "over 250". The most recent tally in this article and the comprehensive table below is over 400. The Mapping America Social Movement Project: Underground GI newspapers (antimilitarist) 1965-1975 at the University of Washington created by the pioneering and relentless historian of the GI underground press, James Lewes, counts 768 GI periodicals. Lewes spent decades traveling the world tracking down hard copies of every GI publication he could find. His list includes the GI underground publications from non-U.S. militaries (which are not included in this article). On the highest end, the Wisconsin Historical Society's GI Press Collection, 1964-1977 (now stored at JSTOR), has digitized 2,437 separate printed items, but it includes numerous individual leaflets and brochures, as well as items created by civilian organizations and individuals.

For this article, only underground newsletters and newspapers created during the Vietnam War are included, and only those from the following categories: by and for GIs (including reserve and national guard), by and for AWOLs and deserters, and by and for veterans. And only those from the U.S. military worldwide, not other nations' militaries. Also included are a small number of draft resistance publications, if they did work with GIs. The accompanying table contains over 400 newspapers or newsletters which historians have been able to locate and document, and a few that have been reported by one or more reputable sources (like US Senate and House investigations), even when there are no known existing copies. For many of the reasons discussed in this article, no small number of these appeared and survived for only one issue. The total number of GI publications, which includes one time pamphlets and leaflets, would climb well into the thousands, but, given their clandestine nature and the difficult circumstance under which they were produced and distributed, it is probably impossible to know for sure.

== Conditions ==
Military units are known for their strict discipline and intolerance for noncompliance. In the U.S. military, stepping out of line, or going against the tide was discouraged and often punished, sometimes severely. During the Vietnam War, the military brass did not look favorably upon soldiers, sailors or airmen who were questioning or resisting the war or military regulations and orders, even more so if it was done publicly. As soon as an antiwar or anti-military newspaper or leaflet would appear on a base or ship the commanders would make every effort to seek out and discipline the GIs responsible. This often meant that those writing and producing them found themselves discharged, transferred, court-martialed or even thrown in prison.

=== Harassment ===
In June 1968, SP5 Charles K. Williams stationed at Fort Bragg got together with a few other guys in his company and, at their own expense and time, printed a small paper called Strike Back. The paper raised typical GI gripes about spit shining boots, polishing brass, forced buzz cut haircuts, etc. It was extremely mild by later GI underground press standards and even announced that it had "no intention of making derogatory remarks about the United States government." The Army's overheated reaction, however, was very typical. The command immediately began a campaign of harassment of the whole company, including increased inspections, mandatory shaving of mustaches, and forced saluting of Non-Commissioned Officers (NCOs), not a normal part of U.S. military protocol. The Military Police (MPs) then called in the FBI to start systematically interrogating suspected company soldiers. When an innocent Private First Class (PFC) was singled out as the probable culprit and threatened with a delayed discharge from the Army, Williams stepped forward and confessed. The result? As Williams described it in the August 1968 issue of Vietnam GI, "They still believe the PFC is responsible". Williams offered advice to other would-be underground press editors—be "discreet" and "maintain anonymity".

=== Discharges ===
PFC Dennis Davis, a member of the Progressive Labor Party and the first editor of the Last Harass, had a spotless career and yet was given "an undesirable discharge 16 days before he would have completed his two-year hitch with an honorable record." His only crime, editing a newspaper which the Army believed fomented "unrest and disloyalty" among the troops. They were so worried about him they rushed him "out of the army in 12 hours, with his first sergeant personally escorting him around the post to clear his records." Along with his discharge papers, he was given a notice of his eviction from the post as a civilian and escorted out the gate.

One of the more public showdowns between a rebellious GI and the military over freedom of the press started immediately after the publication of the first issue of OM: The Servicemen's Newsletter on April 1, 1969. Seaman Roger Priest, who worked in the Pentagon, found himself transferred within two hours to a "broom job" at the Washington Navy Yard. But that was just the beginning. There was a year-long legal battle between Priest and the U.S. Navy, during which he faced up to 39 years in prison. The military was particularly angry because Priest had called Secretary of Defense Melvin Laird "a prostitute and a pimp for the military industrial complex". More, he had insulted the Chairman of the House Armed Services Committee who responded by calling OM a "gross abuse of the constitutional right of free speech" and demanded the Pentagon investigate. The Pentagon assigned 25 military intelligence agents to follow Priest at all times. And then, with the help of the FBI, the telephone company and the Post Office, they tapped his phone, intercepted his mail; and got the Washington DC Sanitation Department to collect his garbage. The problem for the military, however, was that Priest had done all his OM work on his own time with his own money. He had also put his name on every issue, so there was no question who was responsible. Priest became a cause célèbre among antiwar and free speech advocates who created a Roger Priest Defense Committee complete with STP—Save the Priest bumper stickers. In the end, he received a bad conduct discharge.

=== Entrapment, arrest and surveillance ===
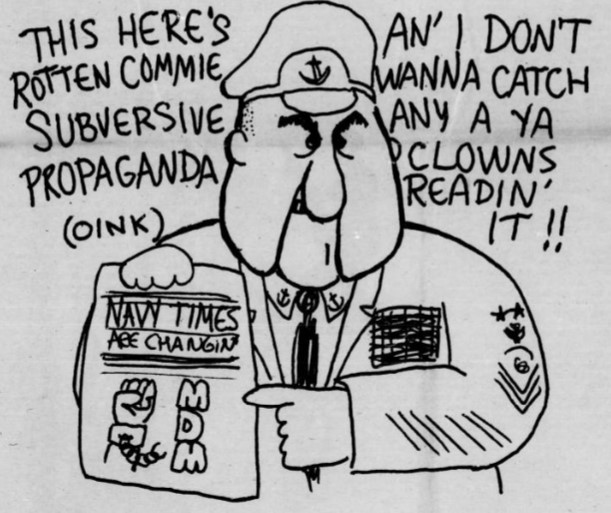
Navy Times Are Changin Cartoon July 1970

The Army's treatment of the Fatigue Press's first editor, Private Bruce "Gypsy" Peterson, was far less lenient. The Fort Hood MPs, with the cooperation of the local Killeen, Texas authorities, devised a plan once they figured out Peterson was involved. In August 1968 he began finding small bags of marijuana in his locker. He immediately threw away each bag, suspecting he was being set up. With this tactic failing, the city police began arresting Peterson for marijuana possession. With the third arrest, they claimed to have found a microscopic amount mixed in with his pocket lint. The amount found was so tiny it was completely destroyed during testing, but nevertheless, he was convicted in military court and sentenced to eight years at hard Labor in Leavenworth federal penitentiary. Two years later he was released on appeal

The New York Times Magazine reported in May 1969 that "A number of soldiers have been punished for circulating underground newspapers, and there have been many search and-seize raids on lockers to discover hidden caches of the papers." A 2015 investigation into the GI movement and the military's response at Fort Bragg provided examples of intensive military agent activity. On "the night of January 28, 1970, four military intelligence agents from the 111th Military Intelligence Group at Bragg conducted surveillance outside the home while two others infiltrated the GIs United meeting inside. The agents copied license plate numbers of parked cars and traced them to G.I.s inside. The agents surreptitiously followed several members of the group into the downtown area as they distributed the February issue of Bragg Briefs."

Virtually every GI publication faced the same difficulties, which often forced a rapid turn-over of contributors. And most papers faced the same dilemma, they either had to cease publication or turn to civilians for help. Not infrequently the civilian help turned out to be the very same GIs, now veterans discharged from the military. Civilian/veteran support was central to the longevity of several of the longest running papers and important to most. As a result, some publications lasted just an issue or two, while those that continued longer, a few even for years, did so with different waves of contributors. Production values also varied widely; some were "barely readable mimeographed sheets" while others developed into regular multi-page newspapers.

=== Official permission ===
There were a few papers that at various times attempted to get the military's permission to distribute on base. Usually this was done as a political stunt, as for example asking permission to distribute the Declaration of Independence or the Bill of Rights, with the expectation that military officials would look foolish in the press and on the local news if permission was denied. At Fort Bragg, for example, before they started their underground newspaper Bragg Briefs, GIs United Against the War in Vietnam (GIs United) sought permission from the base commander to distribute copies of the Bill of Rights and the Army's Oath of Enlistment on post. The group simultaneously notified the national press of their request, putting the Fort's command in a difficult position. The Commanding General eventually granted permission, but only for the one person, Private Joe Miles, who signed the request to distribute, for one hour on two afternoons at three specific intersections. This was "the first time an Army post commander had officially sanctioned distribution of literature by a G.I. antiwar group". It was a very brief window of military democracy, however, as the military police arrested Miles as he distributed the approved material. He was held overnight on "unspecified charges", which were quickly dropped, and then sent to a remote Alaskan Army post above the Arctic Circle. To the Army's dismay, within a few months Miles had created another chapter of GIs United and another newspaper called Anchorage Troop at Fort Richardson. In another example, the Fort Lewis commanding General refused completely to grant permission to the publishers of Fed Up to distribute copies of the Bill of Rights, so they instead tried to pass out the Declaration of Independence, resulting in the arrest of six GIs and ten civilians.

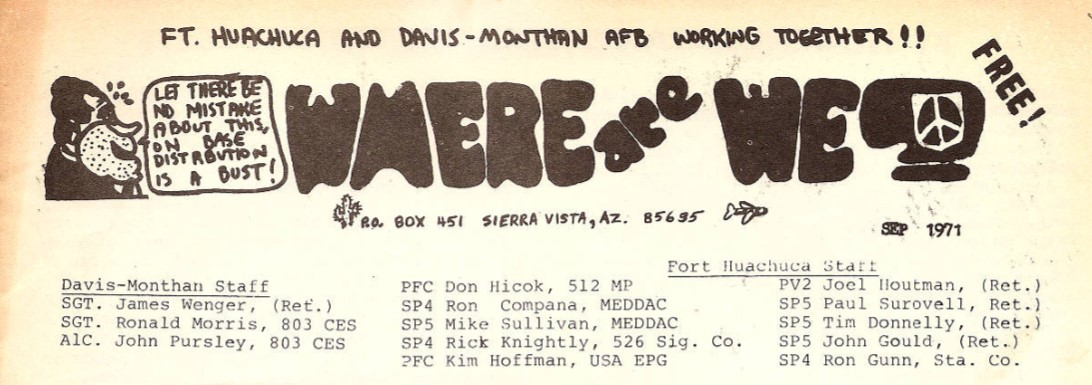
The Where Are We Masthead included the warning that "on base distribution is a bust"

GIs United also sued the Army in an attempt to get permission to distribute Bragg Briefs on the post and even to use the Fort's enlisted clubs for meetings. Eighteen soldiers joined the case U.S. District Court in October 1969 where Specialist Fifth Class, Hal Noyes, a GI United member, claimed that the paper was merely a vehicle to "counteract Army propaganda." The Federal District judge, however, ruled that the Army could "reasonably conclude that the distribution of said publications presented a clear danger to the military loyalty, discipline, and morale of the military personnel." One scholar commented about the ruling that while neither "the federal judge nor the Bragg leadership could...stop the publication of the newspaper; they just ensured that it remained an underground newspaper." The soldiers were not at all surprised and noted, "[t]he Army's case sounded very much like the arguments used to deny civil rights to blacks, prevent labor union organizing, deny women the right to vote, and to disenfranchise the un‐propertied classes of America in the days just prior to the Revolutionary War."

But there was one underground newspaper at Fort Knox called In Formation that sincerely and genuinely asked for permission and followed all the way through. It seems to be the only underground GI publication which applied for and received official Army permission to distribute on base. No known copies exist, but we know it was real due to a tongue in cheek November 27, 1971 op-ed published in The New York Times and written by former Army enlisted man Dave Noland, one of the co-editors of the paper. Noland humorously related the eight-month battle waged with the Army before receiving limited permission to distribute the paper "in an isolated corner of the post for a few hours". The battle involved learning the regs, avoiding violent or revolutionary rhetoric, requesting official permission, appealing to a Senator, contacting the Civil Liberties Union, alerting the press, and still waiting eight-months. They were allowed to set up a few newspaper stands but then were prohibited from being anywhere near or drawing anyone's attention to them. One paper staffer was arrested by the Military Police for "talking to passersby several hundred feet from one of the stands." The "good news" was that the second issue of In Formation was approved in "only" a month. Only two issues seem to have been published, and for good reason – what was the point; there was, after all, an ongoing underground newspaper on the base called FTA, which with no little irony really meant Fuck The Army (as described above).

There was one other short-lived case of a GI underground paper getting permission to conduct antiwar activity on a military base. The staff of the well named Where Are We? out of Fort Huachuca in Arizona requested and received permission to gather signatures on an antiwar petition on the base. They even set up tables in front of the main base exchange, or retail store, where in one day, July 31, 1971, they gathered 540 signatures, including "143 Vietnam veterans and twenty-three officers." That was the end of that—the base command never let them do it again.

=== DOD Directive 1325.6 ===
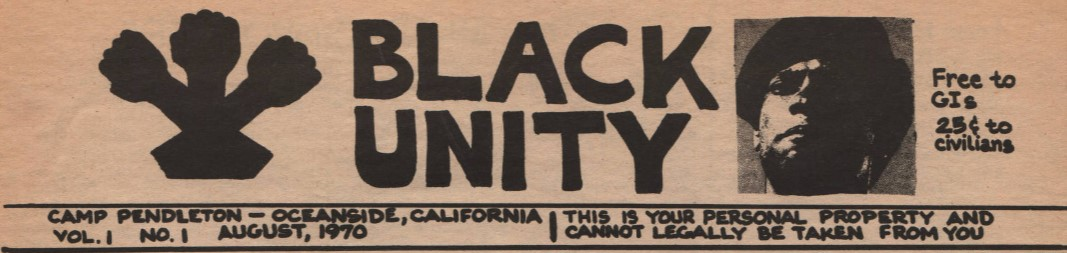
Example of typical legal statement on GI underground newspapers

Acutely aware of their questionable and combative relationship with the military, most papers stated right on their masthead, "This paper is your personal property. It cannot be legally taken from you (see example from Black Unity to the right)." Often, they cited Department of Defense directive 1325.6, paragraph C.5.a.(2), "mere possession of unauthorized printed material may not be prohibited". However, as time went on some papers offered more seasoned advice: The Movement for a Democratic Military warned in their paper Up Against the Bulkhead, "you can still be put on report or cited with an Article 134 if the Brass feels like citing you. So don't kid yourselves. Although you may have many rights on paper, you have none in practice."

== Beginnings ==
The first antiwar publications of GIs, not yet newspapers, were simple posters or leaflets or reprints of speeches given at rallies. One of the earliest was a speech given by Green Beret Master Sergeant Donald Duncan in Berkeley, California on November 20, 1965. He slyly mocked his own credentials: "I am not here today speaking as an expert on Vietnam. I have only been in Vietnam for 18 months, unlike the real experts like Mr. McNamara, who have spent at least 3 or 4 days in that sad country." And he called the prowar arguments a lie. "I went to Vietnam to fight for a Democratic way of life. 18 months later I came home knowing that the fight for democracy is not being waged in Vietnam. THE ONLY FIGHT FOR DEMOCRACY IS BEING FOUGHT HERE AT HOME. IT IS BEING FOUGHT HERE TODAY!" His speech was reprinted and spread far and wide by a group calling itself the Ad Hoc Committee of Veterans for Peace in Vietnam. Duncan, who had been discharged from the military prior to his public speech, was beyond the disciplinary reach of the Army.

Lt. Henry Howe who was stationed at the Fort Bliss Army Base in El Paso, Texas was not so lucky. He marched in an antiwar protest in El Paso on November 6, 1965. Wearing his civilian clothes, he had written his opinion of the war on a large piece of cardboard which he carried in the demonstration. The military did not take kindly to his sign, "END JOHNSON’S FACIST AGRESSION IN VIETNAM". Ignoring the misspellings, they charged him with "using contemptuous words against the President, conduct unbecoming an officer and a gentleman, and public use of language disloyal to the United States." Howe told the New York Times "...I have never refused an Army order. I would go to Vietnam if ordered to do so. On the other hand, I believe I have a right to express my opinions as a citizen." He was court martialed and sentenced to two years at hard labor in Leavenworth military prison, although under growing public pressure, the Army released him after only 3 months imprisonment. Howe's protest is the earliest known instance of a GI publicly writing and demonstrating against the Vietnam War. The newsletters produced by the Freedom Now for Lt. Howe Committee were one of the first GI related underground publications.

On June 30, 1966, three U.S. Army soldiers, the Fort Hood Three, refused orders to Vietnam and gave public statements to the press in New York City. Their statements, which were reproduced in leaflets and pamphlets and used extensively by the broader antiwar movement, said in part:

We represent in our backgrounds a cross section of the Army and of America. James Johnson is a Negro, David Samas is of Lithuanian and Italian parents, Dennis Mora is a Puerto Rican. We speak as American soldiers. We have been in the army long enough to know that we are not the only G.I.s who feel as we do. Large numbers of men in the service either do not understand this war or are against it.... We know that Negroes and Puerto Ricans are being drafted and end up in the worst of the fighting all out of proportion to their numbers in the population; and we have first hand knowledge that these are the ones who have been deprived of decent education and jobs at home.... We have made our decision. We will not be a part of this unjust, immoral, and illegal war. We want no part of a war of extermination. We oppose the criminal waste of American lives and resources. We refuse to go to Vietnam!!!!!!!

They too were sent to military prison.

=== The first GI newspapers ===
==== The Gargoyle ====
In early to mid-1966, probably just before the Fort Hood Three were refusing their orders, the first true GI paper appeared when The Gargoyle was clandestinely created by a couple of Marines at the Camp Lejeune Marine Corps Base in Jacksonville, North Carolina. Lance Corporal John Morgan and Private Steve Ryan printed at least two issues on a crude hectograph machine. They called it an anti-U.S. war policy newsletter and ran it off in their barracks on a table with a large Marine Corps emblem on it. Their first issue was dedicated "to jesus christ and other subversives." A third issue was printed jointly in June 1966 with Kauri, which is the only known existing copy. Kauri was a poetry newsletter published in New York City and dedicated, among other things, to young men who were refusing the draft or who, already in service, were not taking part in U.S. aggression against other peoples, especially in Vietnam.

==== RITA (Resistance Inside the Army) Notes ====
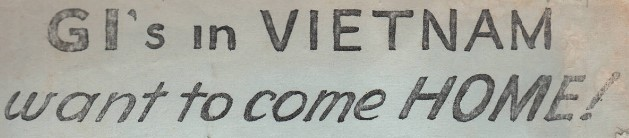
Resistance Inside the Army (RITA) Notes headline, Nov-Dec 1966

A few months later, the first RITA Notes newsletters by Friends of Resistance (or Resisters) Inside the Army (FRITA) started appearing in Europe. RITA was a "loose association" of active-duty soldiers, many of whom had deserted from the Army or, as some of them liked to say, "self retired", while FRITA was an even looser association of their supporters. Published at various times in Paris, Heidelberg and finally in Australia by Max Watts, born Thomas Schwaetzer, who "organized support for American deserters". The initial issue must have shocked the US Army command because it contained a letter written on November 21, 1966, and signed by fourteen soldiers in a combat infantry platoon (from Company A, 3rd Battalion, 12th Infantry) stationed near Tuy Hoa in Vietnam thanking a Michigan politician for placing an antiwar initiative on the ballot. The soldiers included their name, rank and hometown. "...we are the ones who go out and risk our lives", they wrote; We are all "in favor of you and the 14,124 citizens of Dearborn who voted for us thank you." Punctuating their point, just four months later their platoon lost ten men during a battle, including two of the men who signed the letter, Privates First Class George J. Bojarski from Detroit, MI and Charles P. Brown from South Amboy, NJ. RITA Notes was the first of many publications produced by deserters, AWOL's (Absent Without Leave) and their supporters that appeared in Europe and Canada where the soldiers who had resisted and abandoned their posts could more freely gather and publish without fear of arrest and courts martial. It continued off and on for over 800 issues, ending in 2009.

==== The Bond ====
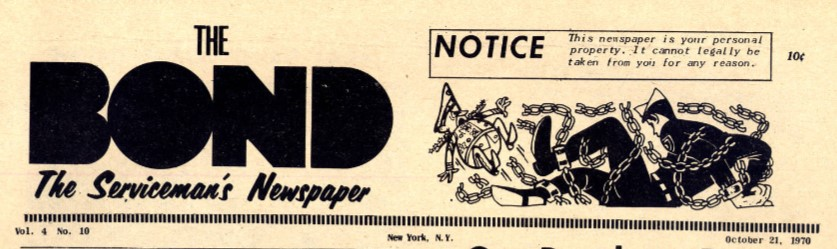
Masthead of The Bond GI underground newspaper

The Bond, whose first issue came out on June 23, 1967, was started in Berkeley, California by a recent Stanford graduate and conscientious objector named Bill Callison. It was an antiwar newspaper intended for soldiers and its title was meant to invoke the bond between antiwar civilians and GIs. It soon had soldiers and civilians on its staff. When Callison was arrested for draft resistance he turned the paper and its 1,000-name mailing list over to an Army Private named Andy Stapp. Stapp, stationed at Fort Sill in Oklahoma, was already in trouble with the Army having faced two highly publicized courts martial for disobeying orders and flouting military discipline. He had become a socialist and student antiwar activist at Pennsylvania State University and decided to accept induction into the Army in order to organize within the military. Numerous commentators have wondered what the Army was thinking when they let him join: "...while still in college, Stapp had joined others in burning his draft card on campus; the students set their cards ablaze in a Nazi helmet." Drafted in May 1966, by late 1967 he was working with other GIs to organize the American Servicemen's Union (ASU), the first attempt to create a labor union within the U.S. military. He felt a newspaper would be the perfect vehicle to spread antiwar sentiment and pro-ASU information. Together with Fayette Richardson, a World War II paratrooper, and Bill Smith, a Vietnam veteran, both located in New York City, they released the first fully GI produced issue of The Bond on January 28, 1968. The Bond began the practice of GIs signing their contributions with name, rank and serial number, following the classic response for POWs under interrogation. The front page of the January 28 issue ran statements from seven black GIs at Fort Sam Houston, which included the following:

On Christmas leave a train of G.I.'s stopped in Texas. Some black troops went into a restaurant to eat but were made to sit in the 'Black Section' or to take the food outside and eat. One brother sat at the 'white' counter for forty-five minutes to an hour and wasn't served. He was wearing the uniform of the U.S. Army, but he was still black.

According to Stapp, by 1970 the paper had 75,000 readers and was receiving dozens of GI letters a week. The Bond was one of the longest-lived GI newspapers and continued publishing until October 1974.

==== Vietnam GI ====
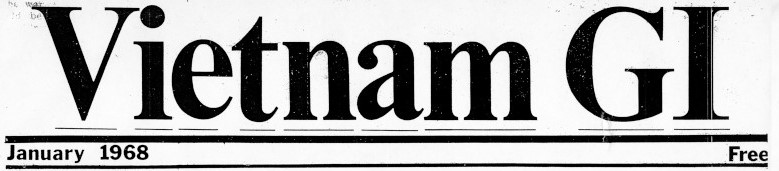
Masthead of Vietnam GI underground newspaper

At almost the same time as the transformation of The Bond into a full-fledged GI newspaper, the first issue of Vietnam GI was published in January 1968. It was started by Jeff Sharlet an Army veteran who while in Vietnam as a Vietnamese language translator learned about the war from the Vietnamese side. He returned home and joined the peace movement at Indiana University. He thought from personal experience that GIs would appreciate an antiwar newspaper written by their peers, and together with some other antiwar activists in Chicago, put out the first issue with over 15,000 copies. They were distributed to soldiers by draft-resistance groups in major cities around the US and the paper was soon receiving hundreds of letters from GIs. One letter commented, "What impresses most of the guys is that Vietnam GI is written to us". Within a few issues the paper claimed to have a mailing list of "some three thousand servicemen in Vietnam." In August 1968, Sharlet told a reporter they were distributing 30,000 copies of the paper, including mailing them "under wraps" to Vietnam. He said they were condemned by the military but "secretly passed from GI to GI." Vietnam GI published for over two and a half years with its last issue coming out in August 1970.

==== ACT: The RITA's (Resisters Inside The Army) Newsletter ====
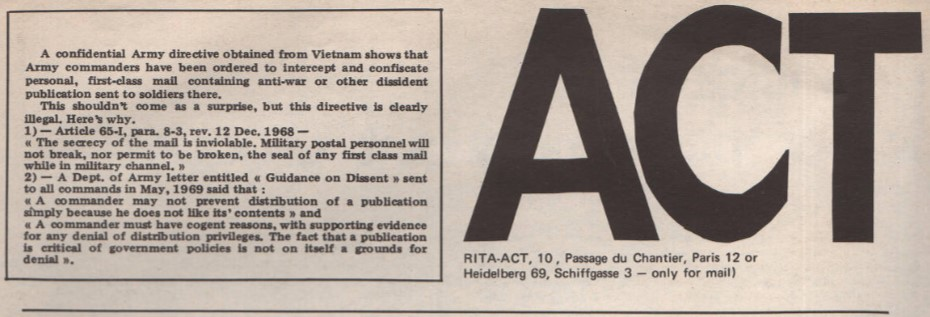
Masthead of ACT: The RITA's (Resisters Inside The Army) Newsletter

Right on the heels of The Bond and Vietnam GI, came ACT: The RITA's Newsletter. It called itself a newsletter, but could easily qualify as a newspaper because it was two-to-four-pages and distributed to active-duty U.S. soldiers stationed throughout Western Europe. Published by the Paris branch of RITA, the first issue came out sometime between January and March 1968. ACT was filled with articles and letters from soldiers, many like in The Bond, signed by name and serial number, as if to quell any doubts about their legitimacy. A common sentiment was expressed in the first issue by Army Private Cornell Hiselman who wrote "I deserted the Army because of the unjust actions committed in Vietnam." He went on to explain why he thought the unjust war was related to the unjust treatment of Black people in the U.S: "You see, they have been fighting for over four hundred years and still haven't got anything but second rate citizenship. Maybe you don't see the connection. Well, what color are the Vietnamese? Yellow. And what color are the Negroes? Black. Maybe these are simple questions, but it gives you an answer. That answer is that our government is racist—Inside and outside the States." ACT put out at least seven issues, the last in 1971. According to one of its editors, it was very successful with a press run of 10,000 and a "mailing list of about ten thousand."

=== Rebelling against more than the war ===
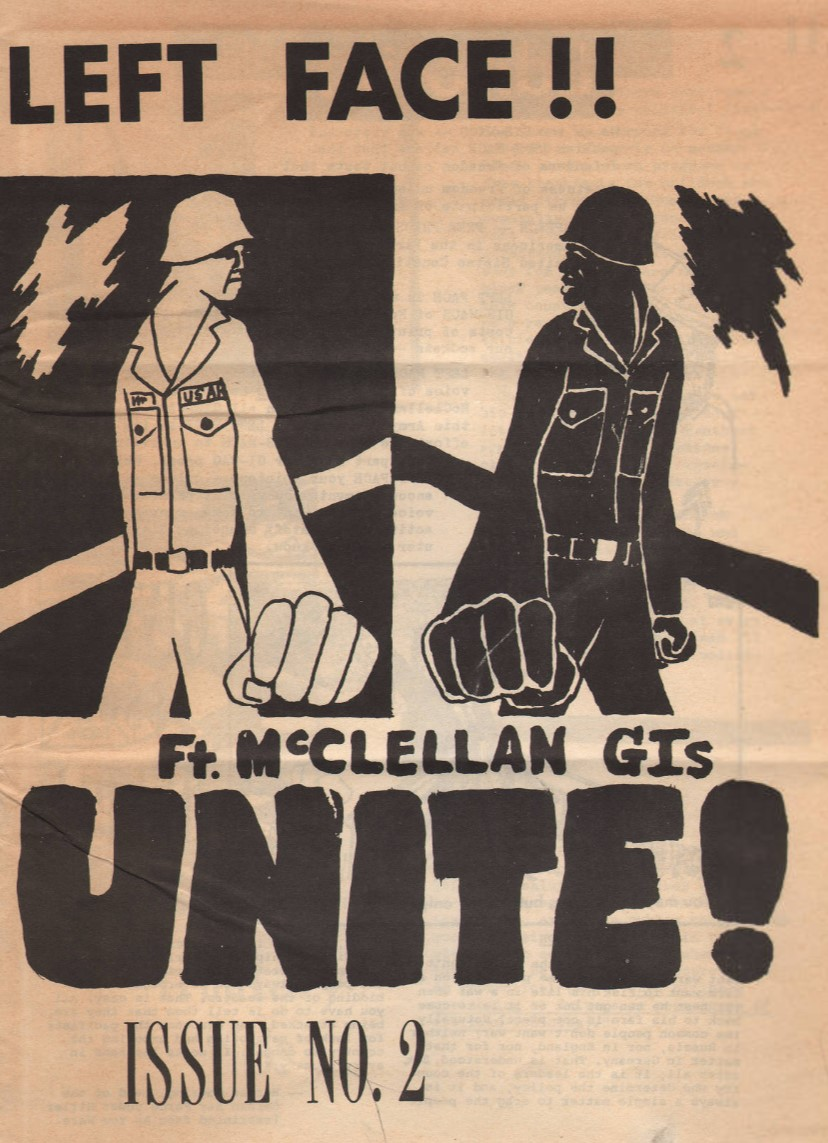
Left Face - Ft McClellan GIs Unite

As GIs stepped forward in opposition to the war, many of them became exposed to the debates and radical political ideas of the 60s and 70s. Further, many GIs had been exposed to experiences in the war and around the world that deepened their understanding of the reality and features of the U.S. global empire. As often happens, when one aspect of previously accepted thinking is questioned, other ideas and behaviors get reexamined. Many GIs began to challenge what they described as the racism and sexism they had seen in the war, in the military's treatment of people in foreign lands and at home. One Naval officer wrote in The New York Times about his 1967 experiences in Olongapo City adjacent to the giant U.S. Subic Bay Naval Base in the Philippines. "It was one of the most celebrated R&R destinations for military personnel in Vietnam, a so called fantasyland for adults." What he described was a town of brothels and honky-tonks, "a nightmare of degradation, all in service to and fostered by the American military. You could throw coins into the sewage-filled river and see kids and desperate Filipino adults dive into the fetid water." "No thank you," he wrote.

Many GIs experienced similar awakenings. One scholar noted about the Vietnam era soldiers at Fort Bragg, "the soldiers in Fayetteville expanded the focus of their movement beyond the single issue of Vietnam to a multifaceted approach that condemned the structural problems, such as racism, sexism, and capitalism that led to global wars in the first place." He continued, "In November of 1971, the antiwar soldiers at Fort Bragg took an unprecedented step.... GIs United, along with the local VVAW (Vietnam Veterans Against the War) chapter, a group of black soldiers, and a contingency of Women's Army Corps soldiers, banded together to form the GI Union." The groups' new demands "reflected this unprecedented collectivity; the group demanded the end of sexist oppression of women and gay people in the military community, the right of black, Hispanic, and other minorities to determine their own lives free from the oppression of racist whites, the end of troops’ involvement in workers’ strikes, and even improved medical and dental care for soldiers and their families." A soldier from the 28th Civil Affairs Company at Bragg spoke for GI's United at their May 1971 Counter Armed Forces Day rally. He said: "We believe that the first priority is to end the war in Indochina. But we know now that when the war ends, our job does not. The war has grown out of the political and economic institutions of this country. And unless we change these institutions, there will be another Vietnam and another Vietnam after that."

Similar transformations and awakenings went on among many of the rebelling soldiers and sailors of that era, as can be seen in the press they produced.

== Underground Press and the GI resistance movement ==
Between 1968 and 1969, GI resistance grew from local protests and publications, mainly concentrated in major cities like San Francisco, Chicago and New York into a recognizable movement. One unprecedented measure of this was that GIs "were simply walking away from a war they no longer believed in." In March 1969, the US military provided data to a Senate Armed Service subcommittee revealing that soldiers were deserting, on average, "every ten minutes" and going A.W.O.L "every three minutes." By mid-year the mainstream press was covering GI resistance stories, but more importantly to GIs, at least 35 underground GI newspapers were being published, and more were being created every month. Disgruntled soldiers could now get news they trusted from fellow GIs.

=== Frequency ===
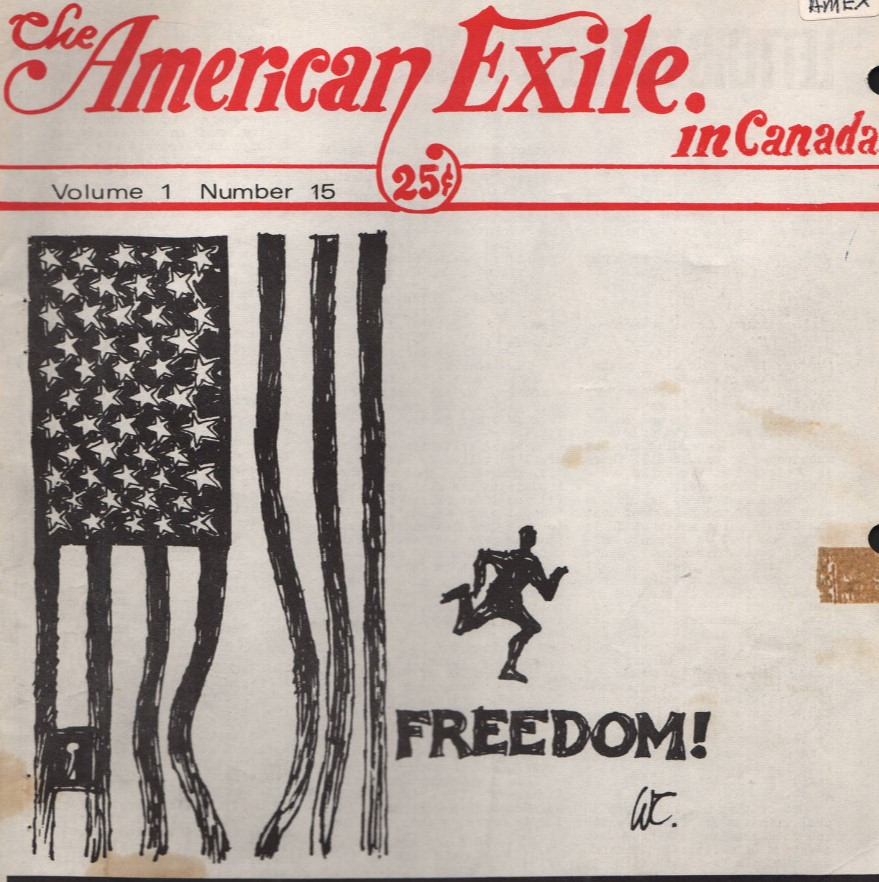
The American Exile in Canada Cover May1969

From 1968 through 1972 the GI press almost literally exploded. During those years, there was hardly a military base within the U.S. or overseas which did not produce at least one underground publication, and some had many. There were even two known papers published by GIs in the combat zone in Vietnam, The Boomerang Barb near Saigon in 1968 and GI Says near the DMZ in 1969. Fort Lewis, which became the army's central training ground for Vietnam combat, complete with a 15,000-acre mock Vietnam village, set the record with 10 different underground GI publications, three as joint productions with GIs from McChord Air Force Base, which also had two just for the airmen and women at their base. The San Francisco Bay Area, a hotbed of antiwar and counterculture activity anyway, which contained several key Army, Naval and Air Forces bases, had an astonishing 31 different GI and veterans publications. Deserter and exile publications were mushrooming as well. The Yankee Refugee!, for US military deserters and draft resisters in Canada, began appearing in late 1968, as did several versions of AMEX put out by Union of American Exiles and other American expatriates in Canada. The Paper Grenade, the newsletter of the American Deserters Committee, seems to have started in 1969, and there were eight different underground publication by deserters and exiles in Sweden. Many of the papers also grew in sophistication and production quality, from mimeographed sheets to regular newspapers.

There were, of course, those that came and went quickly, like the two in Vietnam, as well as Strikeback at Fort Bragg and Pawn's Pawn at Fort Leonard Wood, both of which started and ended in 1968. But there were a number of papers that ran for several years and published many issues.

==== FTA: Fun, Travel and Adventure ====
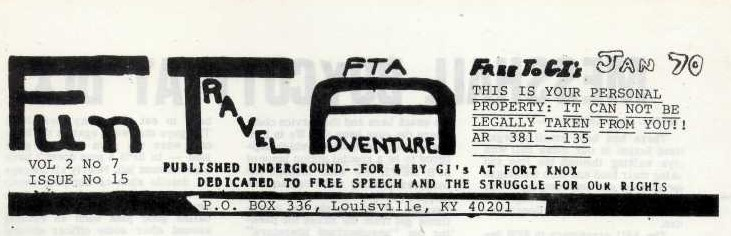
Masthead of FTA GI underground newspaper

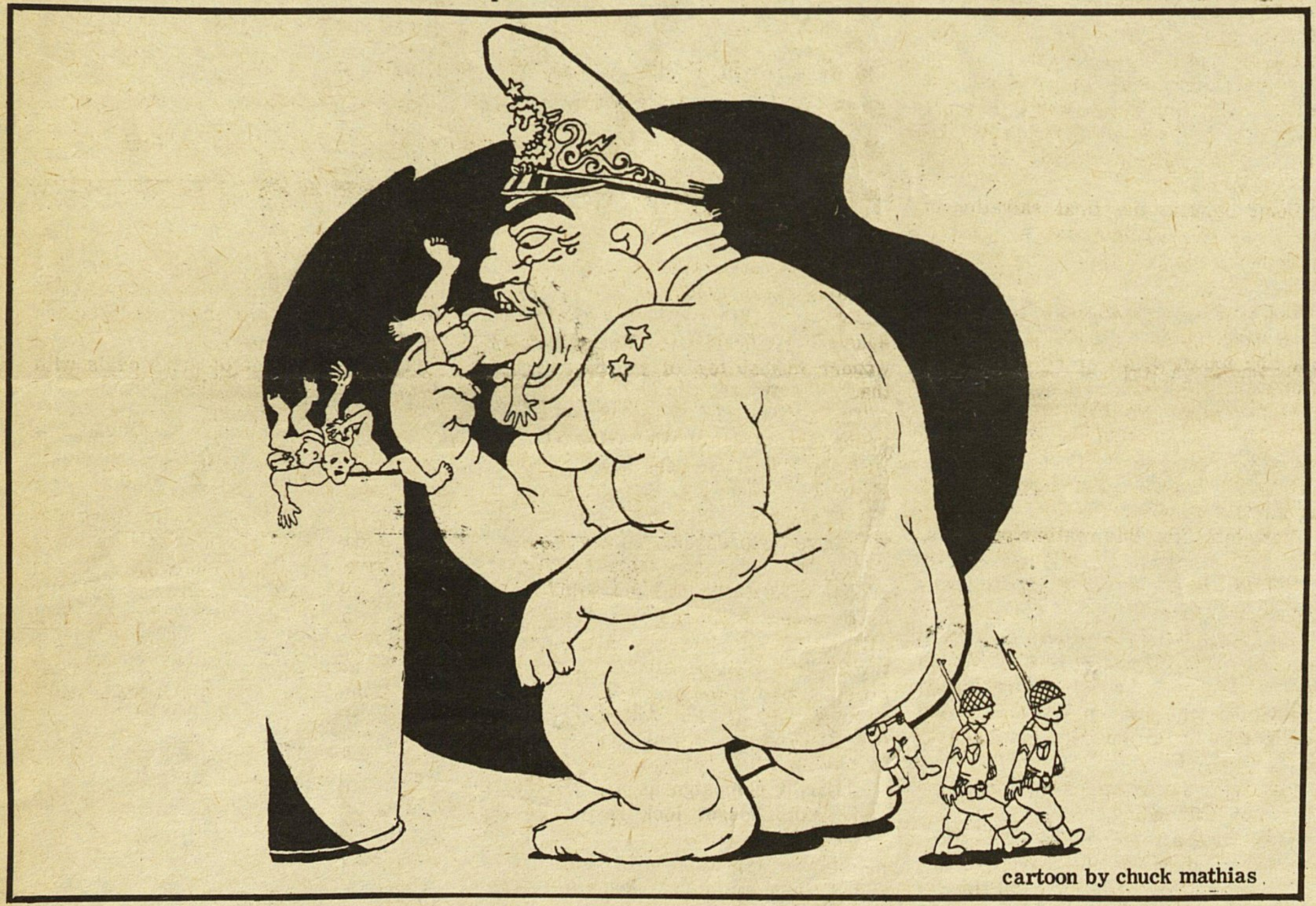
Anti-Military Political Cartoon by Chuck Mathias printed by FTA in Sep-Oct 1968

Early in the Vietnam War, Fort Knox in Kentucky became one of the largest induction centers in the U.S. for new Army draftees. Like several of the key Army training facilities, it had replica Vietnam villages on post. Wherever Vietnam bound soldiers, or those returning from the war, were stationed, GI antiwar activity appeared. At Fort Knox one of the main manifestation of this was FTA: Fun, Travel and Adventure, which, as described above, every GI knew meant Fuck the Army. It published from June 1968 to April 1973 with at least 33 issues. The first issue, published on June 23, 1968, was eight mimeographed pages and written by five soldiers at Fort Knox. They made it very clear this was not going to be another pro-Army paper about "inspirational lifer shit." "We're going to say what most of us say when talking to each other, but we're going to put it in print." They promised "to concern ourselves with the ordinary EM, the non-lifer, the guy who doesn't suck up all the garbage that the Army puts out." (EMs were enlisted men) As if to prove FTA correct, the very next issue reported on a Private John Lewis who had been busted by the Military Police for reading the first issue. He was confined to base for a week while the Army figured out he had broken no regulations and had a civilian attorney representing him, at which point the charges were dropped and he was released. A 1969 newsletter, put out by the FTA staff reported that "after six months the paper was an established fact of life" at the base. They said 2,500 papers were printed each issue, distributed by "some 50 distributors on base".

==== Fatigue Press ====
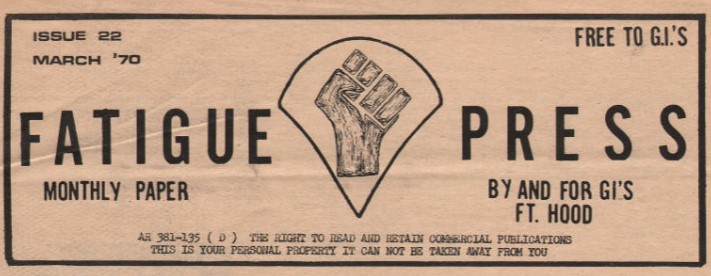
Masthead of Fatigue Press GI underground newspaper

Fort Hood, already on the antiwar map with the 1966 public refusal to go to war of the Fort Hood Three, was the site of one of the first and longest lasting regular newspapers, the Fatigue Press. Located in Killeen, Texas, it was no accident that Fort Hood became an early center of antiwar GI activity, as it was a major training ground and return destination for soldiers heading to and from the war. Over 100,000 soldiers were trained for combat at the Fort Hood, whose version of a Vietnam village contained huts, a prison compound and hidden tunnel entrances. At the height of the war, over 40,000 soldiers were on base with 65% of them just returned from Vietnam. The Fatigue Press put out 43 known issues between 1968 and July 1972. The paper along with the local antiwar coffeehouse, The Oleo Strut, became "one of the most consistently successful organizations of the GI movement," even ending up on the CBS national news in 1971.

The paper's founder and first editor was Private First Class Bruce "Gypsy" Peterson. With the help of the Strut's staff, he mimeographed hundreds of papers and smuggled them onto the base. One of the paper's first major stories was the arrest and trial of forty-three Black soldiers who were among over 100 soldiers from the 1st Armored Cavalry Division who had assembled on the evening of August 23, 1968 to discuss Army racism and their opposition to the use of troops at the pending Democratic National Convention in Chicago. The base had begun training soldiers to be used against civilian demonstrators at the convention and the strong consensus at the meeting was, as the Fatigue Press put it, the "moral conviction that they could not kill fellow Americans in Chicago." The paper supported and widely publicized their cause, and helped with their legal defense. The publicity over the arrest and trial, along with widespread support for the resisters, led the Army to issue only light jail sentences during their courts martial.

After the entrapment and arrest of Peterson (described above in the section on Difficult Circumstances), issue No. 10 of Fatigue Press was put out in his honor. In an article called simply "Gypsy" the editors argued that the newspaper was "the real reason for Gypsy's bust and the stories in it are what the Army had against the Gypsy."

Listen to the stories of other people and keep Gypsy in mind. Listen to the ideas of other people and keep Gypsy in mind. Listen to the responses of other people and keep Gypsy in mind. He fought for a place where people could tell their stories and he fought for a place where people could express their ideas and he fought for a place where people could respond freely and openly to the hearts and minds of others. Read this paper and keep Gypsy in mind. But mostly remember that Gypsy is still in the slam and that the army put him there.

The paper, continued to publish and fight for Gypsy, who two years later was released on appeal.

In May 1972 the paper launched a petition campaign demanding an immediate end to the war which was signed by over twelve hundred GIs.

==== Bragg Briefs ====
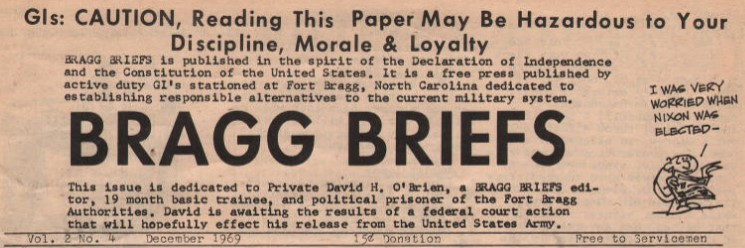
Masthead from Bragg Briefs GI Underground Newspaper December 1969

Fort Bragg in Fayetteville, North Carolina was a key U.S. Army base during the Vietnam War. As early as 1966 it was sending division‐sized detachments to Southeast Asia and by 1968 it housed 57,840 soldiers, making it the largest military installation in the country. In addition, it had troops both coming from and going to the war. Soldiers in basic training getting ready to go to Indochina mixed with returning combat troops waiting for discharge, many of whom were unhappy with what they had seen or done and not afraid to talk about it. As a result, while Fort Bragg was not one of the earlier sites for GI dissent and disobedience, it became "one of the most active centers of the GI movement" and produced one of the longest lasting newspapers, Bragg Briefs. It also has the record for the number of underground newspapers produced at any one base in one year – there were four "published in the spring and summer of 1969". They were Strikeback, Sick Slip, The Fort Bragg Free Press and Bragg Briefs. The first three were "no more than several mimeographed sheets of paper", but Bragg Briefs started in July 1969, remained in circulation until 1975 and had "on‐post circulation of over 7,000".

The two most active antiwar groups on the base, GIs United and the Concerned Officers Movement (COM), were both cited in the Army's fiscal year 1971 official history as causing the "most troublesome display of dissension and indiscipline." COM raised money and ran ads in both The Fayetteville Observer and The Washington Post to "demand the withdrawal of all American military personnel and advisors" by the end of the year. The local ad was signed by twenty‐nine commissioned officers from Fort Bragg and Pope Air Force, while the full-page ad in the Washington Post was signed by over 130 from all over the country. One scholar noted that "Never before, in one place...had so many officers come out against the war, much less in such a public forum."

Bragg Briefs was created by soldiers who were a part of the Fort Bragg's chapter of GIs United. The group became nationally recognized and their paper was one of the reasons. The first issue, put out on July 4, 1969, was a crude mimeographed eight-pager containing content that proved embarrassing for the Army. For one, the issue was dedicated to the "great American soldier and patriot Private Joseph D. Miles" who had just been transferred to Fort Richardson, Alaska above the Arctic Circle, "the U.S. Army's equivalent of Siberia.". Miles was a Black GI who had become a celebrity among rebellious GIs for starting the first GIs United group at nearby Fort Jackson in early 1969. He was a member of the Young Socialist Alliance (YSA) who had been drafted and sent to Fort Jackson where he found soldiers "bitching and moaning" about the war, the Army and discrimination. He started playing Malcolm X tapes in the barracks and soon "began gathering a large crowd of black and Puerto Rican soldiers around his bunk". These gatherings spurred talk of organization and soon GIs United was launched as well as an underground newspaper called The Short Times. The Army attempted to disrupt the group by shipping Miles to Fort Bragg where he very quickly started another chapter of GIs United and was soon arrested for distributing copies of the Bill of Rights and the Army's Oath of Enlistment (as discussed above).

By issue number two, Briefs was a regular printed newspaper. The fifth issue, published in December 1969, proudly declared on its masthead "GIs: Caution! Reading this Paper May be Hazardous to Your Discipline, Morale & Loyalty." On May 16, 1970, GIs United and a local coalition of civilian and student antiwar organizations held the largest Armed Farces rally in the U.S. with four thousand people, including a thousand GIs, crowding into a Fayetteville park. Bragg Briefs played a central role in bringing soldiers to the event where they listened to Jane Fonda, Chicago Seven defendant Rennie Davis and folk singer Barbara Dane.

==== Up Against the Bulkhead ====
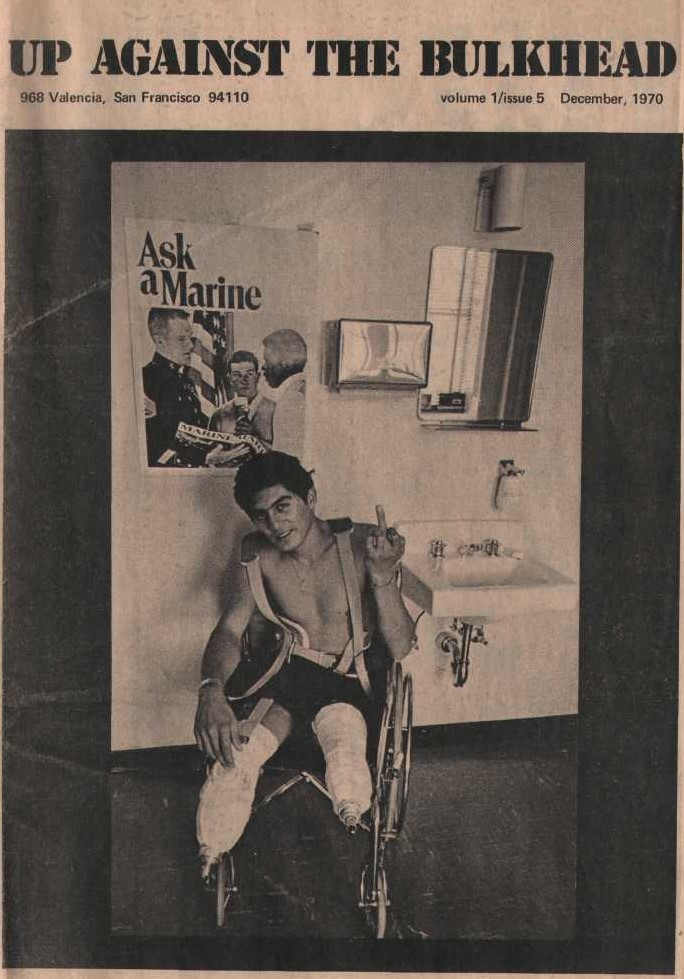
Ask A Marine

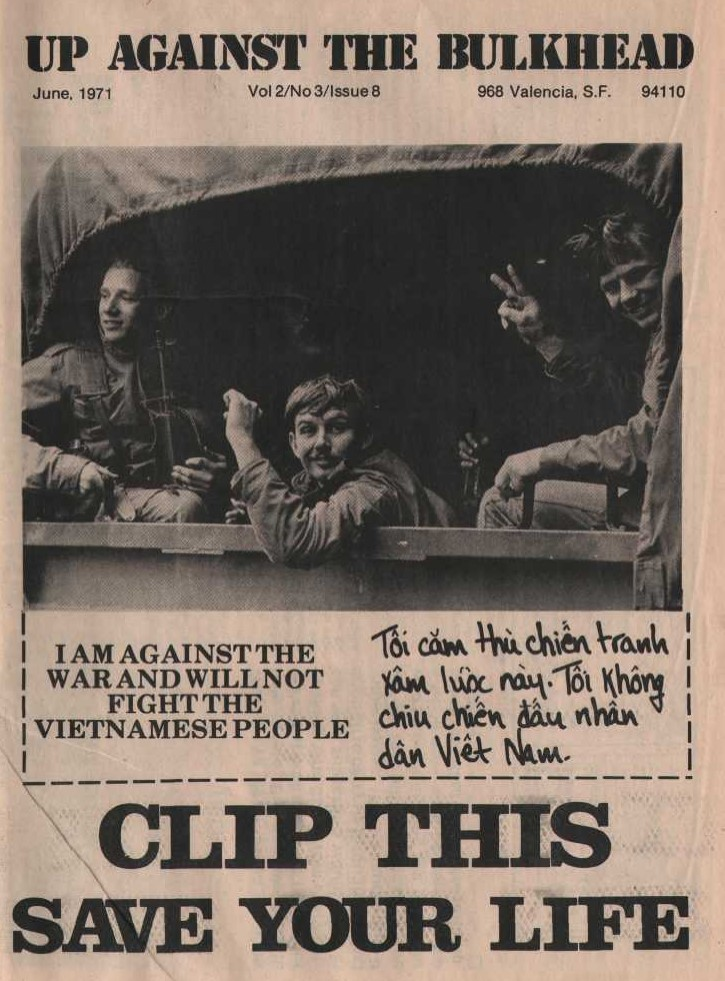
Antiwar message in English & Vietnamese

Up Against the Bulkhead Covers from December 1970 and June 1971

One of the most well-known and longest lasting GI papers was Up Against the Bulkhead put out by the Movement for a Democratic Military at the Alameda Naval Air Station and the Treasure Island Naval Station in the San Francisco area. They published from mid-1970 to mid-1975, putting out eighteen issues, each eight to twenty pages long. The masthead on their second issue was quite prescient, proclaiming "GI's Can Stop The War"—by June the next year the Armed Forces Journal was warning about the "Collapse of the Armed Forces". By late 1971 the paper could be found everywhere GIs congregated in the San Francisco Bay Area and sailors knew where to go when they wanted counterculture help and friendship. It played an important role in supporting the Stop Our Ship (SOS) movement, particularly by aiding the dissident sailors of the USS Coral Sea. As two Bulkhead staffers reported years later, "In 1971 a handful of sailors from the USS Coral Sea" showed up at our office "ready for action". The sailors "were a colorful lot, veritable hippies in uniform...more than eager not only to investigate ways to oppose the war, but also ways to sample the offerings of countercultural hedonism." With Bulkhead support the sailors went on to start the first SOS petition.

One of their most powerful covers is reproduced here. It's a photograph of a Marine whose legs were blown off in Vietnam indicating his vulgar sentiment in front of an "Ask a Marine" recruiting poster. Another memorable cover was their June 1971 "Clip This: Save Your Life" message in both English and Vietnamese: "I am against the war and will not fight the Vietnamese people," which was clearly intended to be carried into combat as a possible life preserver.

==== The Short Times ====
Fort Jackson GIs produced one of the earlier papers called The Short Times. The base was one of the U.S. Army's largest training posts and site of two of the earlier GI actions against the war. One was the 1967 trial of Captain Howard Levy, an army doctor, charged with "refusing to teach medicine to Green Berets and for 'conduct unbecoming an officer' in criticizing the Vietnam War". And the second was a February 1968 on-base pray-in against the war when 35 soldiers gathered in uniform in front of the main base chapel to express "grave concern" about the war. The Fort was also the site of the first antiwar GI Coffeehouse the UFO started in January 1968. Then, in late 1968 the Black soldier name Joe Miles (discussed above) led the formation of the GIs United group and they began publishing Short Times. Short Times lasted for over 22 issues from about November 1968 to April 1972. Started out mimeographed, but by November 1969 was a regular printed newspaper.

==== Gigline ====
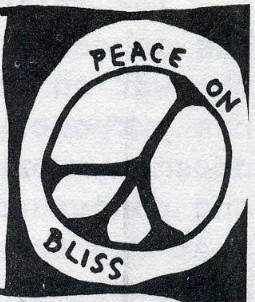
Logo of the Fort Bliss Gigliine

Gigline was called the "Voice of the Fort Bliss GI" It appeared for at least 30 issues from Aug 1969 to late 1972. The second issue announced the formation of a group of soldiers at the fort called GI's for Peace (GIFP). The organization held its first meeting on August 17 with over 600 people attending. A Steering Committee was formed which described the group as a "coalition of Fort Bliss soldiers who are concerned about social injustice, the Vietnam War and the militarization of American society." The Steering Committee spokesman and "national editor" of Gigline, Paul Nevins, got transferred to Germany by the fourth issue. He wrote, "Soldiers are in an extremely vulnerable position, but the consequences of our actions have an effect on the public opinion far out of proportion to our numbers. Although our bodies are the instruments of destruction, our minds can serve as an affirmation of life, and as a vehicle to express mankind's deepest yearning for more peaceful, more united world. Be Brave. Stand up and speak out... FAREWELL, PAUL GOOD LUCK – GIFP." In a 1972 flyer the paper noted, "August marks the second anniversary of GIs for Peace. For over two years an organization of active duty GIs has existed on post and has engaged in many activities. As we move into the third year, we want to tell more of you what we are doing and urge you to join us. First of all, we are all active duty GIs from Bliss.... At present we have about 30 active members.... Beyond that, as many as 1,000 Ft. Bliss soldiers have attended a rally sponsored by GIs for Peace." "Our main regular activity is publishing our newspaper, the Gigline, which appears monthly with a circulation of approximately 3,000."

==== Semper Fi ====
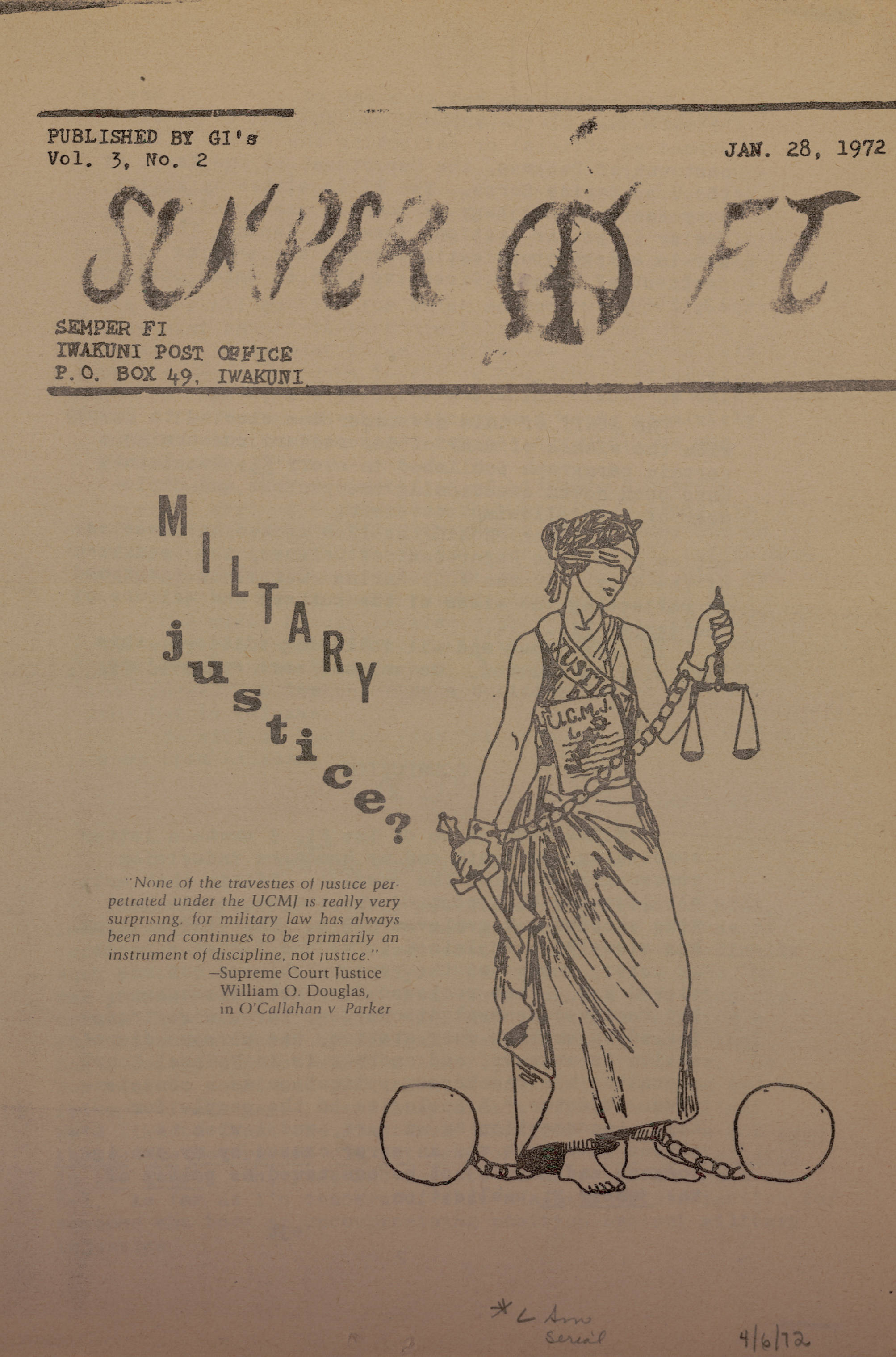
Semper Fi cover, January 28, 1972—Military justice?

The Marine Corps Air Station Iwakuni in Japan was the major Marine staging area for Marine Aircraft Groups rotating in and out of Vietnam. As a result, it also became the "main center of political activity among troops in Asia". Semper Fi was the major GI newspaper at the base and the organization behind it was considered "one of the most consistently successful GI organizations in Asia." It ran from January 1970 to August 1978, with 178 known issues, more than any other active-duty GI produced paper. It was started by Corporals Lonnie Renner and George Bacon, who with several other Marines created a local chapter of the American Servicemen's Union (ASU). They were helped by local members of Beheiren, the Citizen's League for Peace in Vietnam, a Japanese anti-Vietnam War organization. On April 12, 1970, Semper Fi and Beheiren organized a joint peace gathering at the traditional Japanese Cherry Blossom Festival. The gathering of approximately fifty Marines and many antiwar Japanese took place under a "large banner bearing a peace symbol and the word 'peace' in English and Japanese." Predictably the local Marine commanders interrogated three Marines they suspected of being members of ASU and, even though nothing illegal had happened, issued punitive transfers and one administrative discharge. As usually happened in these cases, the heavy-handed military response only increased the ranks of rebellious Marines. As two suspected Marine ASU member were being loaded onto a waiting aircraft at the air terminal "they received a rousing send off from some 20 or so sympathetic brothers". Japanese press reports at that time "estimated that the Semper Fi organization had 350 active supporters at the base."

==== Last Harass ====
Another influential paper was Last Harass out of Fort Gordon in Georgia. The New York Times Magazine called it "probably the best" of the GI underground papers or "at least the most notorious". One of the earlier papers, it was started in late 1968 by Private Dennis L. Davis, a member of the Progressive Labor Party. It ran for at least thirteen issues over three years, one over 40 pages in length. It had a very seat-of-the-pants appearance, but its content set it apart from its peers, with long articles analyzing the war or discussing radical politics and racism, poems, book reviews and letters from GIs. Especially popular were its political cartoons, which were often reproduced in other GI papers. There was the very unhappy "Screwed GI", a discombobulated looking soldier with a screw through his body that many a GI could easily identify with (see above). And the mock ad for an Xmas gift showing a screaming Army Drill Sergeant with a wind-up key in the back of his head. It had numerous "don't miss" features like, "Just Wind it Up and it Will Harass you for Three Years", "Guaranteed to Kill!", and "Guaranteed to be Dumber Than You!", along with the warning "Do not talk back to it – it will court-martial you!" (see Political Cartoons & Posters below).

=== GI Underground Press in Vietnam ===
==== The Boomerang Barb ====
One of the earlier papers was produced right in Vietnam itself in the 191st Assault Helicopter Company, "14 miles, as the Huey flies, due east of Saigon". Perhaps honoring one of the first and most influential of the civilian underground papers, the Berkeley Barb, it was called The Boomerang Barb. For years the only recorded acknowledgment of its existence was an October 25, 1968 article in its namesake Barb announcing "Vietnam has it own BARB!" The original Barb explained they had received "the anonymous paper by mail". In the intervening years the two GI editors, Mike Jackson and Mike Morrison have been revealed in the 191st Assault Helicopter Company Guestbook, which is now archived on the web. So far, only one issue has seen the light of day and a reproduction can be found in the 191st Guestbook. In the issue received by the Berkeley Barb, the two Mikes say they are protesting "the most immoral, evil idea ever conceived, that one man must be forced to fight and die for what another man believes." They continue, "They call us Vietnics and speak of our anti-war protesting as though it were some kind of filthy, subversive plot against everything good and holy." But they make it clear they will continue to publish "whenever we can get away with it." In the surviving issue they say their philosophy "can be summed up as one of freedom. We hold that freedom is man's birthright and his most prized possession." They go on to advocate for the legalization of marijuana, the abolition of laws restricting "who you can have sex with and in what position", the freedom of Black people, and the abolition of the draft. The Guestbook says four issues were produced in all.

==== GI Says ====
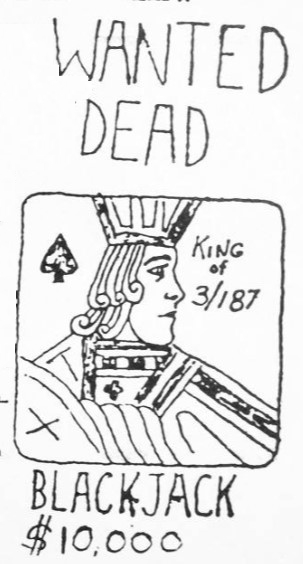
$10,000 reward as reported in GI Says underground newspaper in South Vietnam 1969

Perhaps the most surprising underground GI publication of all was produced by an Army SP4 named Ken Anderberg at Camp Evans, near the Demilitarized zone (DMZ), in Vietnam. He published a newsletter in 1969 called GI Says which was sub-titled "Subterranean News". In a 2021 documentary trailer titled GI Says and released by filmmaker Jason Rosette on YouTube, Anderberg says he produced two issues, although only the second, Volume II, has survived. They were published after the controversial battle that took place from May 13 to May 20, 1969, which came to be called the Battle of Hamburger Hill. The American-dubbed Hamburger Hill was actually a ridge of the mountain Dong Ap Bia in central Vietnam. Over 600 Vietnamese lost their lives in the battle while U.S. losses totaled 72 killed and 372 wounded, and yet the Hill was abandoned by the Army just over two weeks later with a new commanding general saying, "That hill had no military value whatsoever." As Anderberg describes it, soldiers in the 3rd Battalion, 187th Infantry (3/187), already disgruntled about the war, were furious about being sent into the battle and losing many friends, seemingly for nothing. And he heard a rumor they had offered a $10,000 reward for a hit on their commanding officer who had ordered and led the attack, Lt. Col. Honeycutt. Anderberg decided to produce a small newspaper to tell this story, along with other news of interest to GIs. The result was two issues of GI Says, each of which highlighted the $10,000 reward with a graphic. Honeycutt's military handle was "Blackjack" so the paper depicted him as a Jack of Spades and the King of 3/187 (see image). Honeycutt managed to survive the war, but this incident highlights the fact that fraggings, the deliberate killing or attempted killing by a soldier of a fellow soldier, usually a superior officer or non-commissioned officer (NCO), were not at all uncommon during the war.

=== GI Underground Press on U.S. Navy ships ===
One of the more unlikely places where the GI clandestine press could be found was onboard U.S. Navy ships. Most of these were printed ashore, often with the assistance of sympathetic civilians or recently discharged sailors, and then smuggled onboard and distributed to the ship's sailors at favorite shoreside gathering places. But at least one paper was printed and distributed on board a ship at sea.

==== We Are Everywhere (USS Coral Sea) ====
In March 1972, Liberation News Service printed an interview with David Smith and Jeff Dinsmore, two sailors on shore leave from the USS Coral Sea aircraft carrier. It was conducted in Olongapo in the Philippines, the city adjacent to Subic Bay Naval Base, by Elaine Elinson. The Coral Sea has just returned from 37 straight days of bombing off the coast of Vietnam. Smith had been on board the aircraft carrier for three years and three tours in Vietnam. He described how at first he and the other sailors on the ship were gung-ho pro-war, but by the third tour there was tremendous antiwar feeling and "not one wanted to go". They banded together and started the Stop Our Ship (SOS) movement on board. One quarter of the ship signed an antiwar petition before they left the U.S. and at sea they started putting out a newspaper called We Are Everywhere. Smith described how their commanders tried "to keep everything from us—they never let us know how many missions the ship flies, how many villages have been wiped out. So we started putting out a paper called We Are Everywhere, with statistics about how much ordnance we carry, how many people have been killed. We print it right on the ship and spread it all around. We've had three issues so far, and they can't figure out who's doing it." Dinsmore talked about the things they could not ignore, "They assemble the bombs right near where we eat. I see them putting them together—the 500 pounders—and at Christmas they wrote on them 'Merry Fucking Christmas, Charlie'. We bombed right through on Christmas Day, 15 miles from Danang; that really pissed off a lot of guys."

==== Freedom of the Press (USS Midway) ====
Freedom of the Press was published in Yokosuka, Japan by and for sailors of the USS Midway aircraft carrier and the Yokosuka U.S. Naval Base. It was the longest lasting of all ship's papers, with 21 issues between early 1973 and August 1974. It was associated with Vietnam Veterans Against the War/Winter Soldier Organization (VVAW) and published by GIs and civilians at the New Peoples Center.

==== Kitty Litter (USS Kitty Hawk) ====
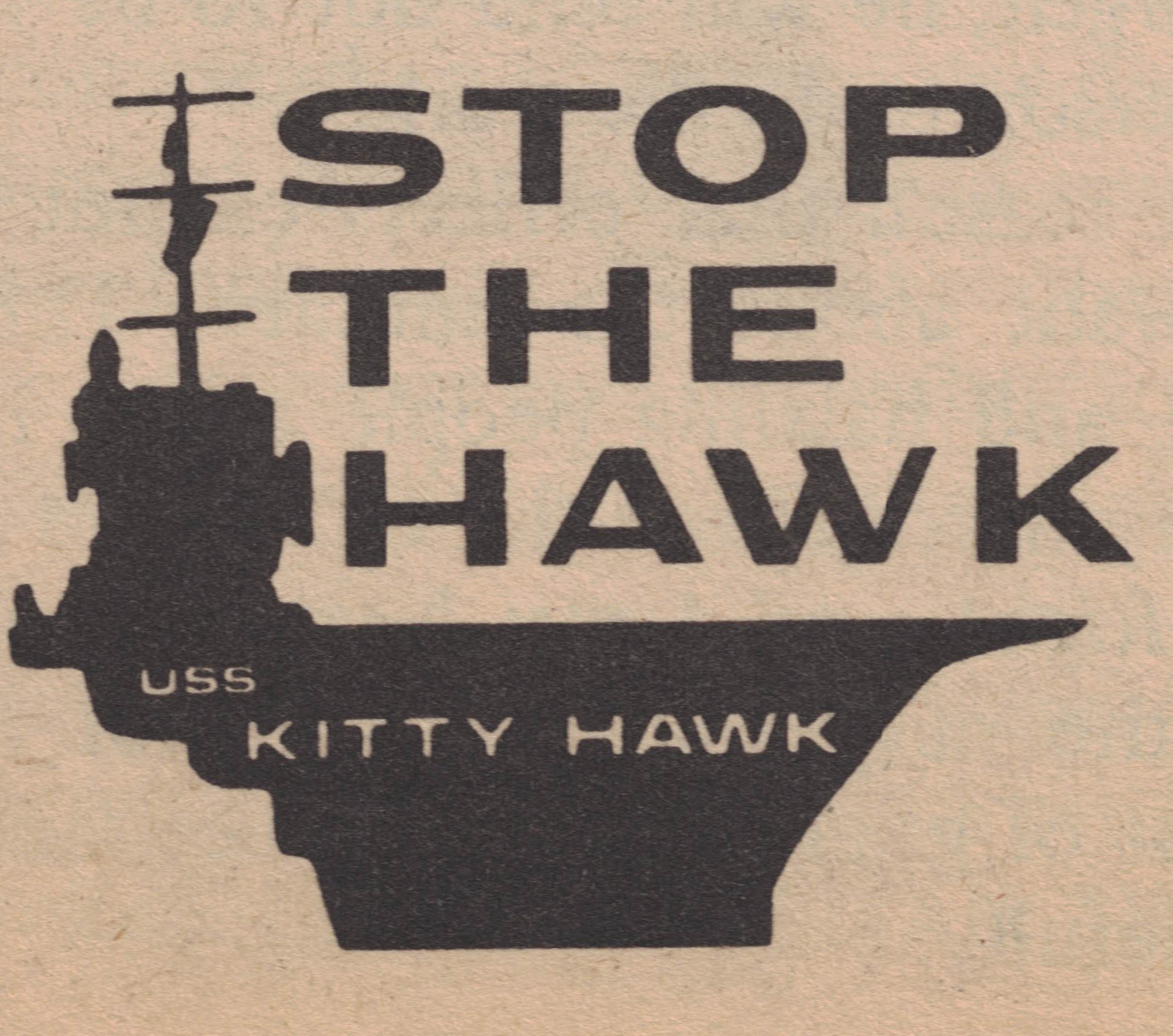
Stop the Hawk antiwar sticker found stuck all over the ship

Kitty Litter was published by USS Kitty Hawk aircraft carrier sailors, ex-sailors and their friends in San Diego, CA from November 1971 to August 1972. There were seven known issues. It was associated with Concerned Military and the Harbor Project, groups of sailors, civilians and ex-sailors waging antiwar campaigns directed at aircraft carriers. The paper covered the results of a large antiwar campaign directed at the USS Constellation aircraft carrier and the Connie 9, nine Constellation sailors who jumped ship when it sailed to Vietnam in October 1971. Then it played a central role in the efforts to stop the Kitty Hawk during its preparations for departure to Indochina, including the creation of the sticker shown here, many of which ended up plastered on the ship. It also was able to tell the inside story when seven members of its crew publicly refused to sail and took refuge in local churches.

==== Other Navy Papers ====
Logo of Duck Power, newspaper of GI's Against Fascism

In November 1971, before We Are Everywhere was published on board the USS Coral Sea and while the carrier was still in San Francisco, a mock version of the official USS Coral Sea Plan of the Day was distributed on the ship and created quite a stir. Called the USS Coral Sea POD, it showed all officers on duty all day while all the enlisted had free time. The Command Duty Officers were "LCDR Ass" and "CDR Hole". The officer in charge of the Afterbrow was "Captain Kangaroo". Only one issue seems to have been produced.

Much of the U.S. based Naval military activity took place in San Diego, California, so it's not surprising that several papers were located there. Duck Power was produced in San Diego by sailors stationed at North Island Naval Air Station who called themselves GI's Against Fascism. The Center for Servicemen's Rights helped sailors from the USS Duluth put out the USS Duluth Free Press. There were more than three issues with the last one dated Mar-Apr 1974. That same year the Center helped the sailors from the USS Chicago put out a paper called the Pig Boat Blues. It was published for two issues, but no known copies exist. Another San Diego paper was the Scraggie Aggie Review by the sailors aboard the USS Agerholm which came out in 1974. It was created by Seaman Recruit David Medina and about six other of the ship's sailors to protest unsafe conditions on the ship. Also in San Diego, the sarcastically titled This is Life? was published by Concerned Military for Sailors on the USS Gridley a navy destroyer. Only one issue seems to have been printed in 1972.

In San Francisco sailors from the USS Hunley put out the humorously named Hunley Hemorrhoid for at least three issues in 1972. And the same year, sailors from the USS Enterprise nuclear aircraft carrier, learning from the sailors on Coral Sea, put out a knock-off of the ship's official paper, the Enterprise Ledger called the SOS Enterprise Ledger. It looked exactly like the real paper except that it was filled with information about the bombing of the dikes and other Vietnam War news. As with the Coral Sea, only one issue of the mock paper seems to have been produced.

The sailors on the USS Longbeach, which coincidentally was docked at the Long Beach Naval Shipyard, must not have cared for their ship too much as their paper was called the Longbitch. Its existence was reported in Camp News and Rita Notes in March 1972 but no known copies exist.

== Black, women and Native American GI representation ==
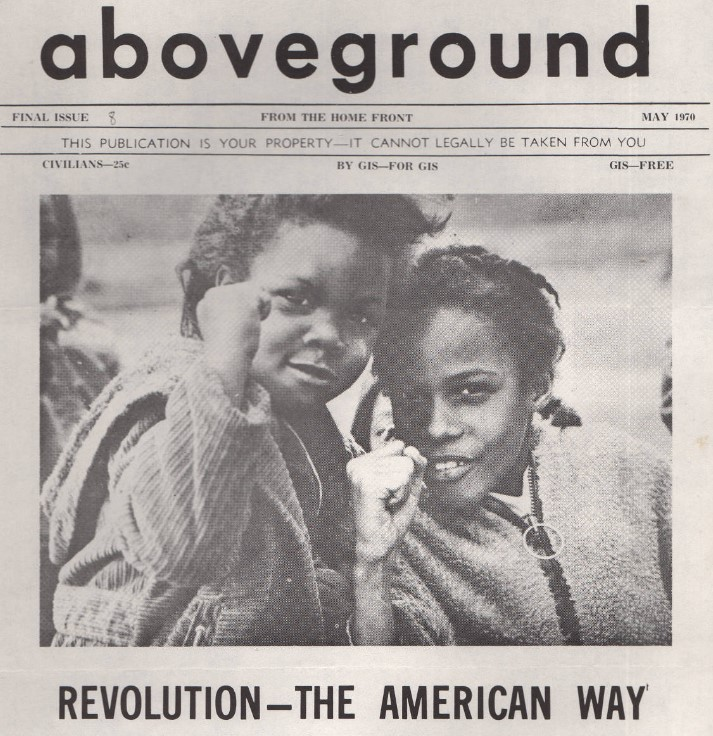
Aboveground GI underground newspaper cover May 1970

During the Vietnam war, in addition to the movements against the war itself, there were movements and rebellions among numerous other groups which also found expression within the military. Given the relatively conservative social structures within military ranks when compared with the larger society, it's no surprise that the movements in the U.S. as a whole were reflected, even at times intensified, inside the military. While many of the GI publications during this era spoke to issues other than the war, including about racism and sexism, there were also at least thirteen publications specifically by and for Black GIs, four by and for women GIs, and even one by and for Native American GIs.

=== Black GI papers ===
From the day in 1967 that Muhammad Ali took a stand against the Vietnam War and linked it to the treatment of Black and brown people in the U.S., resistance and questioning of the war among Black Americans became more pronounced, and perhaps no more acutely that among Black GIs. Several historians have observed, in "Vietnam black soldiers were among the most outspoken and effective critics of the war." Black GIs also responded "to rising demands in the late 1960s for Black Power." And their "motivation to protest was often driven more by racism than by the war itself." This was certainly true for Robert Mahoney, a Black sailor and a founder of Duck Power, one of the earliest underground papers in the Navy. He and his fellow Black sailors experienced selective discrimination as personal posters of respected African Americans of the time, like Huey Newton and Malcolm X, were confiscated and destroyed, while white sailors’ posters of anti-establishment people like Bob Dylan or of nude women remained untouched. When confronted, a Chief Petty Officer who had destroyed some posters said "Yeah, I did it, because it was commie literature." In addition, when a senior officer was told of racial incidents involving white sailors calling other whites "n___ lovers" for hanging out with Black sailors, the officer demanded to know why the white sailor would want to hang out with the Black sailors. All of this convinced Mahoney and other enlisted men of the need to fight back and to educate their fellow sailors. In Duck Power, which was produced by both Black and white sailors, they did also condemn the war, but that was not the first motivator for the paper. Overall among Black GIs, a combination of resistance to both the war and racism within the military and in the larger society led to conflicts with the military. And the military's reaction was often hostile as evidenced by then Chief of Staff of the United States Army General William Westmoreland's 1971 response to a newspaper picture of two Black soldiers in Germany giving the Black Power salute to an officer—he wrote to the Army's Commanding General in Europe, "This is terrible. What kind of Army are you running these days?"

==== A'bout Face 1 ====
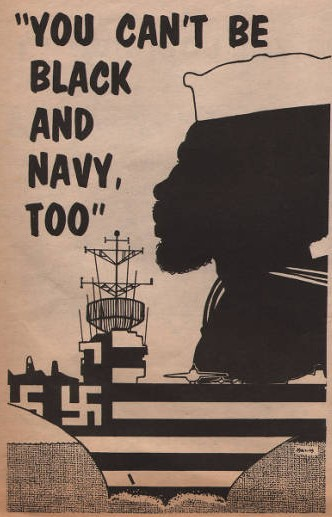
"You Can't Be Black And Navy Too" reversed the Navy's recruitment slogan: "You can be Black and Navy Too." From The Veteran 1972

The longest running GI paper by Black GIs was A'bout Face, which was published in the Heidelberg/Mannheim area of West Germany, the location of numerous U.S. military installations, including the Patton, Coleman, Mannheim and Turley Army Barracks, some of which were ex-Nazi barracks with swastikas still visible. It was put out by UBS, which stood for either or both the United Brothers and Sisters or, more often, the Unsatisfied Black Soldiers. There were at least thirteen issues, although the first known issue dated June 13, 1970 says "Another GI paper published by UBS", so they were likely more. That issue made its sympathies clear at the top of the first page, "STOP THE GOD DAM WAR!". And, "We want all Black men to be exempt from military service.", which was demand number six of the Black Panther Party, apparently a powerful influence on the group. Historian David Cortright has argued that the "most militant and effective political organizing in Germany occurred among black soldiers." As evidence of this, during the spring of 1970 A'bout Face issued a "Call for Justice" inviting U.S. soldiers from all over Germany to come to the University of Heidelberg on July 4 for a meeting to discuss their grievances. The paper even called it a "trial" and charged Uncle Sam with "genocide, mass-murder of millions of people, political murder, economic murder, social murder, and mental murder." The "Call" must have struck a nerve among U.S. soldiers, especially Black soldiers, as almost a thousand active-duty GIs showed up, most of them Black. This was apparently the largest gathering ever for the GI movement in Europe. The proclamation released at the end of the meeting contained ten demands which were far reaching and testified to the depth of Black political consciousness of the times. They ranged from an immediate end to the war, to the withdrawal of "all U.S. interests from African countries", and included several demands related to justice for non-white GIs within the military, improved access to education, hiring more Blacks in civilian jobs connected to the Army, and "equal and adequate housing" for Black GIs. A'bout Face continued publishing for over a year and the last issue came out in August 1971.

==== A'bout Face 2 ====
There was a second version of A'bout Face which started publishing in Heidelberg the month after the last issue of the first version. It was produced by the Black Disciple Party and lasted for four issues from September to December 1971. They seemed to have had some differences with the Unsatisfied Black Soldiers and called for more action. As they put it, "We now study ways and means to destroy or bring this military system to a screeching halt."

==== The Voice of the Lumpen ====
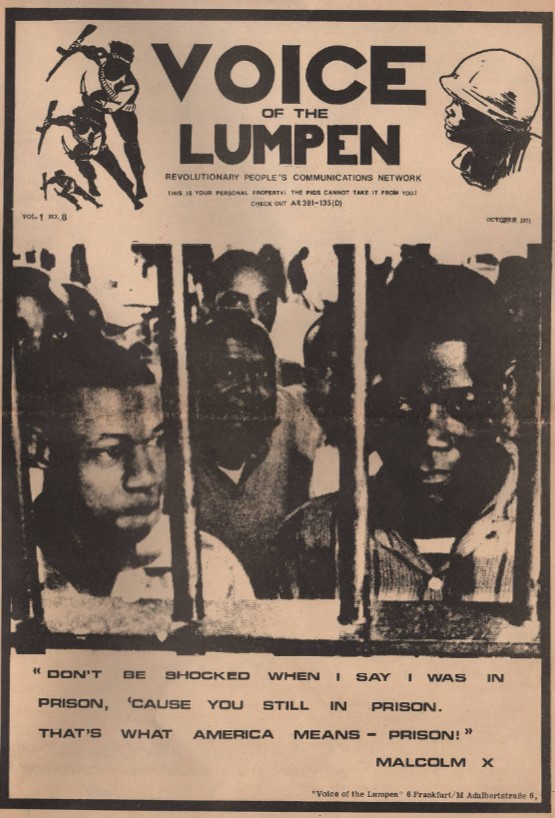
Voice of the Lumpen GI underground newspaper Cover October 1971

Another example of the influence of Black soldiers in West Germany was The Voice of the Lumpen, which was put out by supporters of the Black Panther Party Solidarity Committee. Between sometime in 1970 to April 1972, thirteen issues were produced. They declared they were speaking to all U.S. GIs in Europe, but the content was overwhelming tilted toward the struggles of Black soldiers and Black people. From issue number seven on they said they were a part of the Revolutionary People's Communication Network. They put out a Lumpen Manifesto between the fifth and six issues that declared "our goal is to destroy the evils of U.S. capitalism, imperialism and racism", which they said had been used to "oppress the peoples of the world". They pledged themselves "to move against the evil and corrupt gentry by any means necessary and sufficient."

==== Exposure & The Black Tribunal for Awareness and Progress ====
There were two more Black GI produced papers in West Germany. A group calling itself the Black Soldiers Alliance (BSA) put out a paper called Exposure specifically for the Patch U.S. Army Barracks in Stuttgart, West Germany. It came out for two issues in 1971 with the second one coming out in May. It called itself "a Black GI publication" and said since Black soldiers have never been listened to in the Army, through "Exposure we will voice your opinions and feelings; expose the white racist for what he is." A paper called The Black Tribunal for Awareness and Progress came out for one issue in November 1971 in West Germany. It was directed to all "Black Brothers stationed overseas" and dedicated "to the plight of the now Black man in a racist, capitalist scheme of this White immoral society."

==== Demand For Freedom ====
In Japan, Demand For Freedom came out for at least 5 issues between Oct 1970 and sometime in 1971. It was printed by and for Black GIs at the Kadena Air Base in Okinawa. The first issue declared, "All power to the Third World. Power to all oppressed people." In a section called "Why this Newspaper", they explained, "We don't belong in this military now, we have nothing to defend over here. All of you who go around and kiss this pig's ass are just the ones that are holding back our liberation from this racist, capitalist society."

==== Tidewater Africans & Rise Up And Fight Back! ====
The Tidewater Africans newsletter was published by a group, which also called itself the Tidewater Africans, in Norfolk, Virginia for at least 2 issues in 1973. Norfolk was the location of numerous key East Coast Naval installations, including the Norfolk Naval Station & Naval Air Station. The newsletter was called "The Voice of Black GI's" and the group said they had, "organized to fight for the rights of Black GI's and all Black people." They made it clear they were not opposed to struggle of white enlisted people, and said the efforts were inter-related, but, they explained that "true unity" was not possible until "white enlisted people deal (away) with their racial prejudice against Blacks". The group also produced a pamphlet called Who We Are: And Why We Have Organized, which explained they had started in the wake of a racial fight at the Norfolk Naval Amphibious Base. As they described it, white and Black sailors "were probably equally responsible for the actual outbreaks of violence. However, when charges were brought against those persons involved in the fights, only Black were charged". They concluded that "the military is HIGHLY RACIST and ANTI-BLACK" and that they needed to "GET ORGANIZED" to deal with it—hence, the Tidewater Africans.

In 1974 another publication by Black sailors in the Norfolk area called Rise Up And Fight Back! may have also appeared, although no known copies exist. The group behind it called itself the Black Military Resistance League and said it was formerly the Tidewater Africans. The only known mention of this publication was in the August 1974 issue of VVAW/WSO GI News, which said the group was "an organization of black active-duty enlisted men and women, veterans and other civilian supporters".

==== Other Black GI Publications ====
Between 1970 and 1972, six other publication by and for Black GIs were produced at various U.S. military installations. Black Unity came out for two issues in 1971 at the Camp Pendleton Marine Base in Oceanside, California. Along with the Black Panther Party they called for "all Black people to be exempt from Military Service" and they declared they would "not fight and kill other people of color in the world who, like Black people, are victimized by the white racist government of America." Do It Loud came out for one issue at Fort Bragg, in Fayetteville, North Carolina in February 1970. It was produced by a group called The Black Brigade which said it was established "to represent the Black man within the military in directing demands for measures to be expeditiously taken against racism". There were two publications by the Movement for a Democratic Military and the Black Servicemen's Caucus out of the Long Beach Naval Station and Naval Shipyard in Long Beach, California. Out Now! was published for six issues between, probably between 1971 and 1972, and then Now Hear This! which said it had formerly been Out Now! came out, but only for one issue. Then there was the Black Voice which may or may not have really existed out of Fort McClellan in Anniston, Alabama. No known copies exist. It was referenced in Congressional Hearings in 1972 and Haines.

=== Female GI papers ===
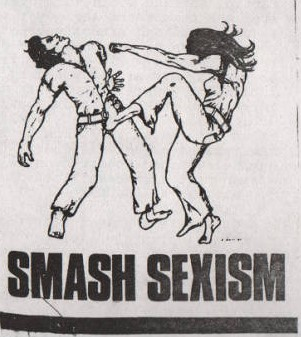
Smash Sexism Graphic printed in Hanau, West Germany by Lamboy Times 1975

While many of the GI publications were directed toward the women in the military as well as the men and had women contributors and supporters, there were also at least four papers mainly by and for women. None of them lasted for very long, but their existence speaks to the depth and breath of the rebelliousness within the military ranks and among military dependents. GI movement historian David Cortright notes that just as in the larger society, "women in the military are excluded from positions of authority and are disproportionately assigned to low-skill, service occupations." He also observes that, "[m]achismo, the attitude of assertive male superiority, is an essential element of military culture and plays a key role in conditioning hostility and insensitivity among servicemen." he connects this with the "pervasiveness of prostitution near major bases" which is ubiquitous and promoted by the U.S. military, especially overseas, and reinforces a negative view of women and "helps to maintain the illusion of male superiority."

==== Women Hold Up Half The Sky ====
Women Hold Up Half The Sky was produced by women at the Yokosuka Naval Base in Yokosuka, Japan. It came out in 1974 for three issues. It was created by women in and out of the military and for military women and dependents. The cover of the first issue contained a list of the kinds of platitudes and insults women hear all the time, like "a women's place is in the home," "with her looks she doesn't need brains," "women are so emotional," "frigid bitch," etc. It went on to say, they were "fighting against the ways we are oppressed using the ways we are strong."

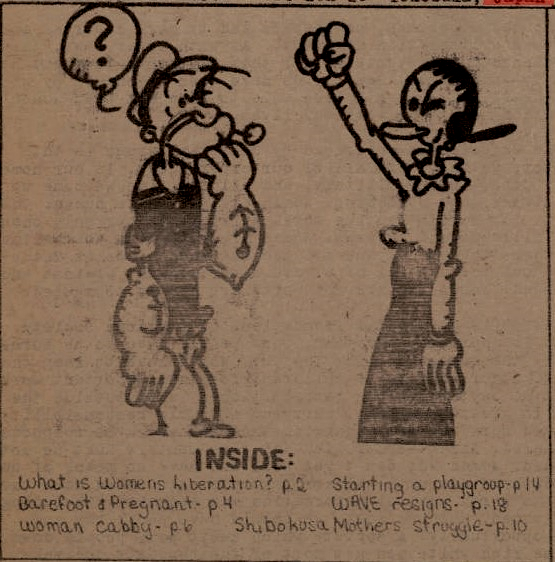
Women Hold Up Half The Sky GI Underground Newspaper Cover March 1974

==== Women's Voices ====
Also out of Japan was Women's Voices in Okinawa which came out for two issues in 1974. It was by and for women on Okinawa, both servicewomen and civilians. It was supported by the Women's House, "a place where women can get together and talk about children, our husbands, health care and our lives." The first issue focused on health care and had articles about going to the gynocologist, excerpts from the well known Our Bodies, Ourselves by the Boston Women's Health Collective, birth control, and more.

==== Women's Voice ====
Women's Voice at the Norfolk Naval Station and Naval Air Station in Norfolk, Virginia came out for one issue in April 1975. It was created by the women of the Defense Committee in the Norfolk area, which had been formed to defend a Navy sailor, Jeff Allison, who they felt had been unjustly blamed for a fire on board the USS Forrestal. The explained that, "women of all races...have special hassles, and as women associated with the military; either by being in the military, married to someone in the military, or living in military towns, these hassles are intensified."

==== Whack! ====
Whack! came out of Fort McClellan in Anniston, Alabama. There are no known copies but at least one issue seems to have been published in April 1971. It was a Women's Army Corps (WAC) newsletter, by WACs and civilian women organizing at Fort McClellan. It does seem likely it existed as an announcement of the first issue and an article from that issue were published in the G.I. News & Discussion Bulletin and it was cited in Beyond Combat: Women and Gender in the Vietnam War Era.

=== Native American GI papers ===
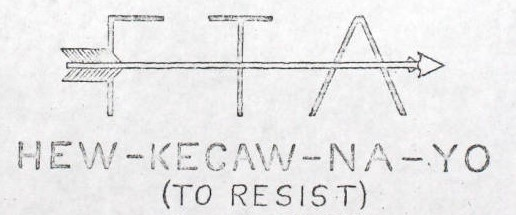
The Logo for the Yah-Hoh Native American GI Underground Newspaper

Yah-Hoh was the only known paper by and for Native American servicemen and women. The paper's name Yah-Hoh means "Lets Get It Together", and the group creating it called themselves Hew-Kecaw-Na-Yo (To Resist). It was created by GIs at Fort Lewis Army Base and their logo was the letters FTA (Fuck The Army) with an arrow through it. The cover page of the first, and it seems the only, issue stated:

This newspaper is published by Hew-Kecaw-Na-Yo, an organization of American Indian servicemen and women that are preventing the psychological conditioning of Indian minds. It was formed for the purpose of helping a struggling people to retain their identity even in the white supremacists most powerful organization, the U.S. armed forces. Hew-Kecaw-Na-Yo is dedicated to Indian unity; united we stand, divided we fall.

The issue included articles from several Native American soldiers describing their experiences in the Army and explaining why they were resisting. Myron Gibbs wrote, "the white intruder has transformed a beautiful, primitive land into a great machine for war, taking my people into his services, taxing my people under his laws".

== Support for the environment ==
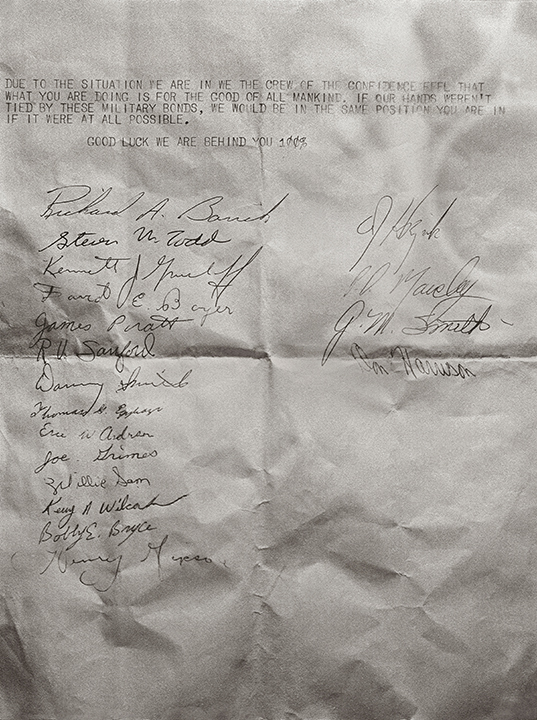
Support Letter to Greenpeace voyage from 18 crewmembers of USCGC Confidence 30 Sep 1971. Photo by Robert Keziere.

=== FID ===
While some GI underground papers and organizations, along with the others in the radical movements of the times, were among the early voices speaking to the dangers posed to the environment and the planet by war and nuclear weapons, there was one GI publication and organization that stood out for its farsightedness on this issue. The Concerned Servicemen's Movement (CSM) in Kodiak, Alaska, which published the FID newsletter for much of 1971, played a minor but noteworthy role in the founding of the influential environmental group Greenpeace. CSM counted both U.S. Navy and Coast Guard personnel among its members and had a number of sympathizers on the U.S. Coast Guard cutter Confidence. Ironically, on September 30, 1971, the Confidence was ordered to intercept and board a boat which turned out to be the original Greenpeace on its way to protest a powerful U.S. nuclear underground test on the island of Amchitka. Recognizing the significance of the environmental boat's voyage, eighteen Confidence crewmen penned and then smuggled aboard a letter of support for the Greenpeace crew and voyage. Its message was clear, "Good luck. We are behind you one hundred percent." Shouts of "The U.S. Coast Guard is on our side" were heard on the protest vessel. This sympathetic action helped influence the members of the Greenpeace crew to found the organization we know today. FID was started by Lt(jg) Norman Bleier who had been active in the Concerned Officers Movement in San Diego until he was told by his commanding officer that he was "being transferred to Kodiak to freeze until your enlistment is up." In addition to the environment, FID covered the war; officer/enlisted relationships; GI, worker and civil rights; and the relationship of service personnel to the civilian community.

== GI Underground Press in military prisons ==
There are only four known papers put out by GIs who were imprisoned in military brigs or confined in some way for discipline. It each case it seems the prisoners or confinees would write their articles and smuggle them to supporters on the outside. Especially for the brig prisoners, it must have required a fair amount of courage and subterfuge to write anti-military material and then risk passing it somehow to supporters. Getting caught before hand-off would likely have resulted in serious repercussions and harassment.

=== Unity Now ===
Unity Now was printed by mimeograph or copy machine and only three issues seem to have come out. It was produced in October and November 1970 by GIs detained in the Special Processing Detachment (SPD) at Fort Ord. The SPD was reserved for "troublemakers" and AWOLs, either waiting for trials or just released from the stockade. Issue number 3 said, "This paper was born within the fence of SPD as a weapon against militaristic oppression and is dedicated to the Fort Ord 40,000 in their struggle for freedom!" It went on to say its purpose was to "advise the people of their rights in the army and to keep on top of the really beautiful and growing revolutionary movement going on within the Military today."

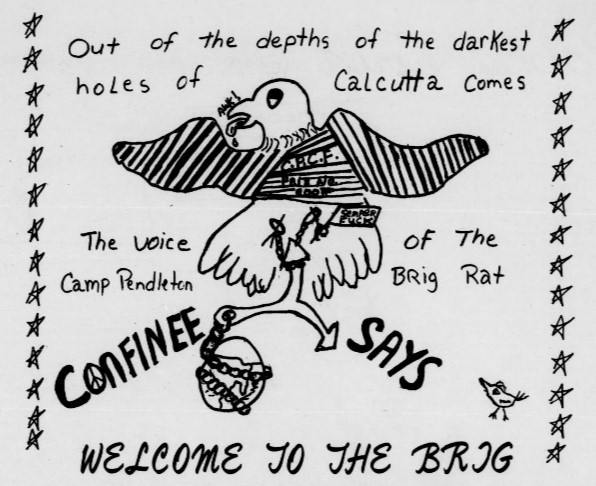
Masthead of Confinee Says the Camp Pendleton brig paper

=== SPD news ===
SPD news, another paper out of a Special Processing Detachment, this one at Fort Dix, lasted for at least 16 issues from May 1969 to August 1970. The writers described SPD as "a half-way house between the stockade and the rest of the army." Apparently it was located "in the boondocks" and put there "purposefully to isolate SPDers". The paper celebrated the fact that even though the brass thought "they would be able to fuck over us more way out here. This has proven untrue. We are now fucking over them"; presumably by publishing the paper. The paper was supported by the American Servicemen's Union.

=== The Stars-N-Bars and Confinee Says ===
These two papers were both short-lived, which is understandable because they were produced by soldiers in full military prisons. Confinee Says, "the voice of the Camp Pendleton brig rat" came out of Camp Pendleton and Stars-N-Bars was produced in the brig at the Marine Air Station in Iwakuni, Japan. The Stars-N-Bars said it was written by the "Forgotten Few", while the Confinee Says masthead read, "Out of the depth of the darkest holes of Calcutta Comes the Voice of the Camp Pendleton Brig Rat." Both of them came out in 1970.

== Supporting organizations ==
As noted earlier, very few of the GI publications discussed here could have survived, especially for very long, without the support and help of civilians, both individually and through antiwar and radical political organizations.

=== United States Servicemen's Fund ===
The anti-Vietnam War United States Servicemen's Fund (USSF) promoted free speech within the U.S. military, funded and supported independent GI newspapers and coffeehouses, and worked to defend the legal rights of GIs. It was founded in 1969, just after the first GI underground publications began to appear. In a 1971 publication it reported it was financially supporting seventy-six organizing projects, including coffeehouses and newspapers. For example, the "majority of funds" for Bragg Briefs came from USSF. It's important to note here that GI coffeehouses were often critical to the existence and survival of local underground newspapers. The coffeehouse was often the office where the GI paper would be put together. It served as a "financial linchpin" for a number of the larger and longer lasting newspapers and it received "contributions from major players and organizations in the civilian antiwar movement." USSF was also the principle initial financial supporter of the notorious traveling antiwar FTA Show starring Jane Fonda and Donald Sutherland.

=== Pacific Counseling Service ===
The Pacific Counseling Service (PCS) was founded in 1969 to provide legal and counseling help to GIs opposed to the Vietnam War. By the end of the war it had counseled and supported many thousands of disgruntled and antiwar GIs, many of whom found ways out of the military or to avoid combat. It also helped GIs at ten or more U.S. military bases, most of them in Japan, to create and distribute underground newspapers. Publications PCS helped with include Hansen Free Press, Okinawa Strikes, Stars & Strikes, Yokosuka David, AMPO, Come-Unity Press, Counter-Military, Fall In At Ease, Freedom Rings! and Getting Late! (see table below GI Underground Press During the Vietnam War).

=== National Lawyers Guild ===
The National Lawyers Guild is a progressive public interest organization of lawyers and legal experts that was founded in 1937. They helped support at least two GI underground publications in Japan and produced at least two themselves specifically for rebellious GIs. Anti*Brass was created by the Military Law Project of the National Lawyers Guild, to "serve the needs of the military man, regular/reserve/ROTC, who has or may have a legal problem with the military". It was promoted as the "Information Center for Military Legal Problems." One piece of advice it offered to GIs was to highlight a comment from a speech by a military judge to a group of JAG lawyers: "The most important duty of a military lawyer is to make the accused THINK he's getting a fair trial." They also published Tricky Dix Law and Orders for soldiers at Fort Dix and McGuire Air Force Base in New Jersey. It was seen as "a place for GIs to get legal assistance", and highlighted the "Strangest Case of the Month" in the first issue. As they told it, a Guild attorney prevailed on a Military Judge at Fort Huachuca in Arizona to finally dismiss, after 51 pretrial motions, the charges against a Private Adam Wall for disrespect to an officer. Wall was so pleased with the outcome, and still so upset at the military, that he responded by making "a decidedly obscene gesture at the entire tribunal." Wall was immediately rearrested on the same charge, "but has remained undaunted".

=== GI Press Service ===
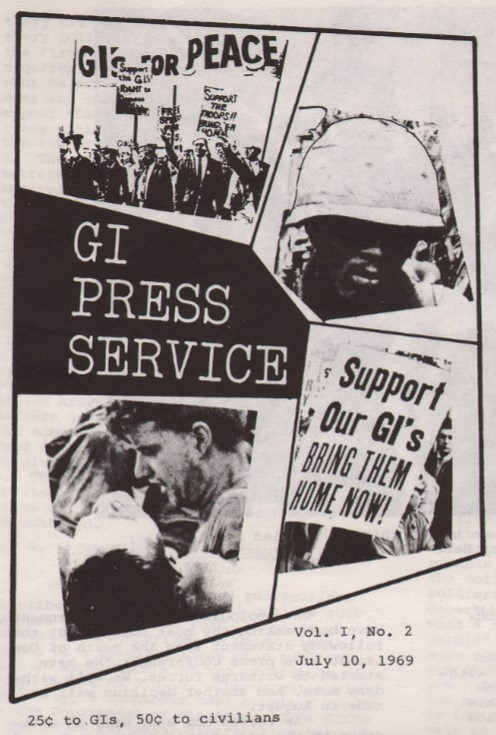
GI Press Service news for the GI underground press July 10, 1969

Launched in June 1969, the GI Press Service newsletter was designed to be a central source of information and coordination for the GI movement. It was created by the Student Mobilization Committee to End the War in Vietnam (SMC), which was one of the earliest organizations to recognize the significance of the budding GI movement, and edited by ex Army Specialist 4 Allen Myers who had previously founded the Ultimate Weapon underground newspaper at Fort Dix in New Jersey. SMC was allied with the Young Socialist Alliance, the youth wing of the Socialist Workers Party (see below for more the SWP's role in the GI underground press). The GI Press Service lasted for a little over two years and played an important role during the early years of the GI press by supplying centralized information and press ready copy for the emerging newspapers and newsletters at military installations. They offered their material for a nominal fee ($1.00 per year) to all GI papers, to "be used with or without acknowledgment of the GI Press Service."

=== Liberation News Service ===
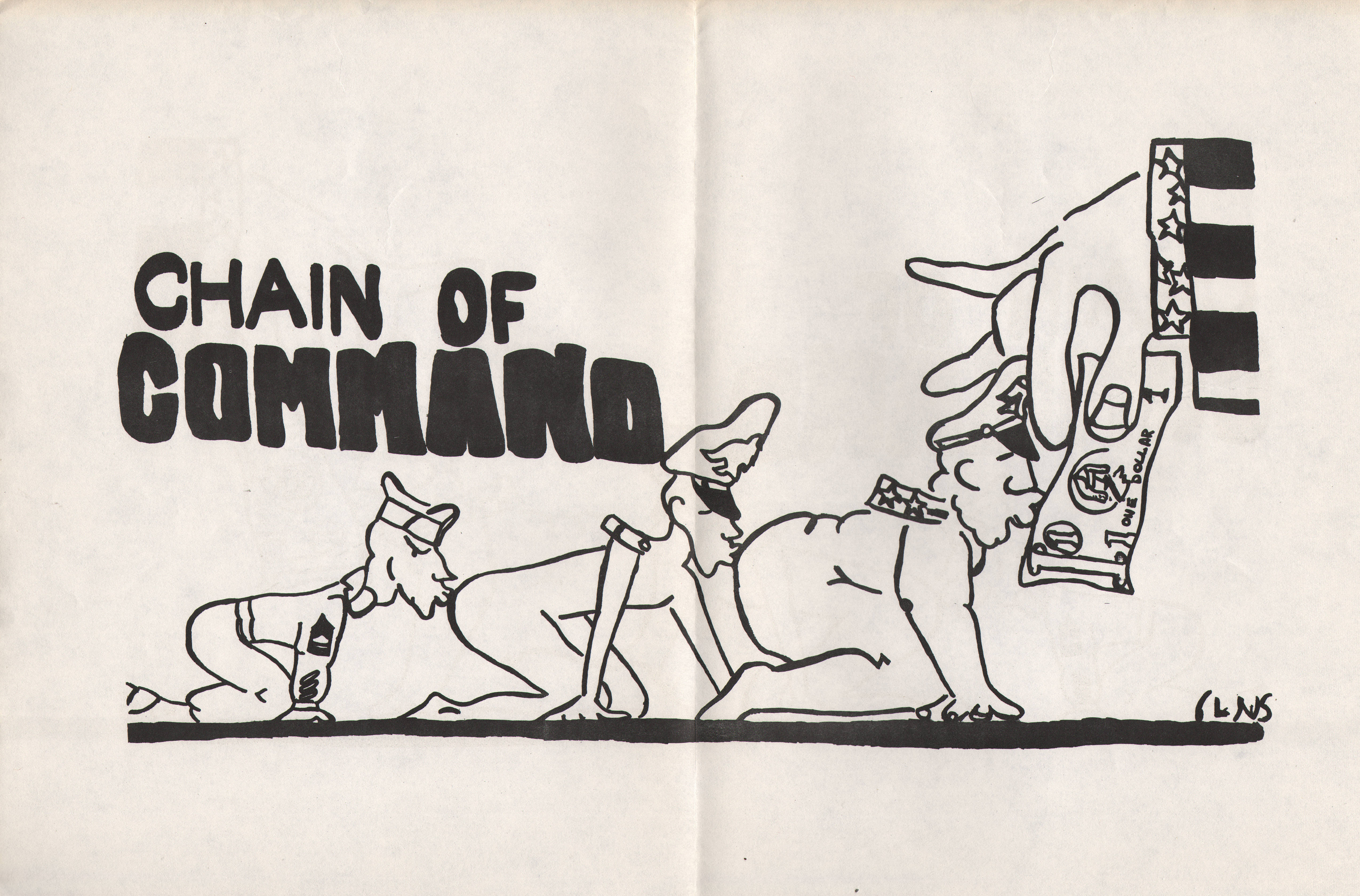
Liberation News Service "Chain of Command" political cartoon, 1972

The Liberation News Service (LNS) was a New Left, antiwar underground press news service which sent out news bulletins, photographs, political cartoons and graphics to subscribing underground, alternative and radical newspapers from 1967 to 1981. The GI underground press often carried LNS material, which could be inserted "as is" or slightly modified into their publications, often adding a "touch of professionalism". The "Chain of Command" LNS graphic (shown here), must have struck a nerve among editors of the GI press as it appeared in a number of publications. It depicts the upper ranks of the military hierarchy—non-commissioned officers (NCOs), junior officers, and commanding officers—each kissing the ass of the rank above until they reach the top where the commanding officer is kissing a dollar bill held by an Uncle Sam-like hand. This particular version was carried in a 1972 issue of FTA at Fort Knox.

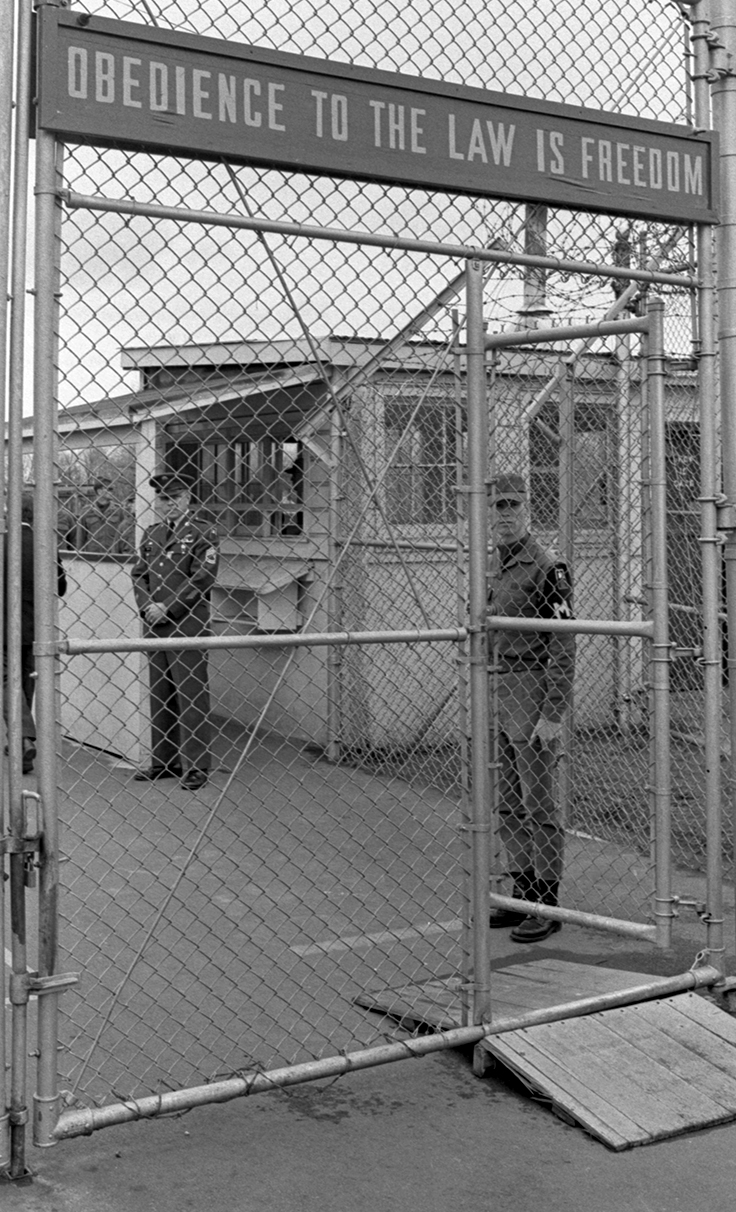
Fort Dix Stockade Entrance Sign 1969. Photo by David Fenton.

Another favorite, which also appeared in quite a few GI publications, was the "Don't Let This Happen..." political cartoon by LNS from December 1969 that you will find below in the section on Political Cartoons & Posters. This one shows six stages in the life a young man being drafted or recruited into the military. He starts out looking happy and carefree, moves into the military where he slowly becomes, at first unhappy, then angry and finally as a viscous fanged pig or hog. These cartoons were a favorite part of the GI press for many. Another significant LNS contribution to the GI press was a 1969 image by one of their photographers, David Fenton, who captured a sign hanging over the entrance to the Fort Dix stockade—"OBEDIENCE TO THE LAW IS FREEDOM". As Fenton described it years later this "Mussolini-like slogan" went viral all over the world. It received "so much attention that an embarrassed U.S. Army felt compelled" to take it down.

=== Students for a Democratic Society & Camp News ===
In the June 24, 1968 issue of New Left Notes, the Students for a Democratic Society (SDS) issued a resolution in support of GI organizing and in favor of initiating and supporting "activities directed toward creating a radical political consciousness among the members of the Armed Forces". Over the next few years numerous SDSers and ex-SDSers became involved in the GI movement and the GI press in various ways. The most influential of these contributions was probably Camp News created by the Chicago Area Military Project, an organization of ex-SDSers. CAMP started in early 1970 as a counseling service for resisting active-duty and AWOL soldiers and evolved into a clearing house for GI antiwar and resistance news, providing material for many GI newspapers. Cortright has called it one of "the most influential support groups of the GI movement". By 1971 it had replaced GI Press Service "as a world-wide GI-movement newsletter." Until the latter half of 1973 it "served as the most authoritative information source available on servicemen's dissent."

=== Socialist Workers Party ===
The Socialist Workers Party (SWP) and its youth group the Young Socialist Alliance YSA became involved very early in the GI resistance movement and with the GI press. Fred Halsted, the leader of the SWP during the Vietnam War, claims in his book "Out Now! - A Participant's Account of the American Movement Against the Vietnam War", that the YSA "was the only major radical youth group to consistently advocate work among GIs." It is true that most of the antiwar and radical forces in the early years of the war, prior to around 1968, focused mainly on broad antiwar work and draft resistance, whereas the YSA did have members entering the military. Halstead explained the YSA was opposed to the draft, but "YSAers did not advocate or engage in draft refusal...because they didn't think it was the most effective thing to do. To them it seemed that, in a choice between spending two years or so in jail or an indefinite time in exile as opposed to spending two years in the army talking to fellow GIs against the war, the army was politically the more effective choice." He went on to say that it was left up to the individual YSA member, but "with few exceptions YSAers who were drafted chose to enter the military." In the early days of the war, a drafted YSAer would show up for induction with an armload of antiwar literature and a number of antiwar supporters. The Army would draft them anyway, but as time went on began to rue that decision and started refusing to induct YSAers. This change of heart on the Army's part was, of course, because some of the early GIs public resisters were YSAers. For example, Joe Miles, a Black activist from Washington, DC, was a member of the YSA before he got drafted in 1968. He went into the Army as an organizer against the war and racism, where as described above, he started playing Malcolm X tapes in the barracks and ended up causing no end of trouble for the Army. He helped create chapters of GIs United at three different bases, Fort Jackson, Fort Bragg and Fort Richardson, and at each base he helped create the underground newspapers The Short Times, Bragg Briefs and Anchorage Troop. YSA members had a hand in a number of other GI publications, including G.I. Voice (the one out of New York City area), The GI Organizer, New Salute, The Oppressed, The Pawn, Open Ranks, Aboveground, The Retaliation, Star Spangled Bummer and The Twin Cities Protester.

=== Progressive Labor Party ===
The Progressive Labor Party's (PLP) role in the GI movement and press started very early but a bit accidentally. Their approach had been to fight against induction into the military, but the 1966 drafting of PLP member Dennis Davis turned that around. Davis showed up at the induction center armed with leaflets, announced he was a communist, railed against the "imperialist war in Vietnam", and proceeded to disrupt his medical physical. To his complete surprise, "the sons of bitches still took me!" He reported back to his organization and asked, "What do you think I ought to do now?" Apparently, prior to that point, no one from PLP had been accepted by the military, but his induction started a seven-year PLP organizing effort inside the Army. As discussed above, Davis was the first editor of Last Harass, one of the more influential of the GI papers. Other paper with PLP support or influence included Fragging Action, EM-16, Open Sights, FighT bAck (in West Germany) and GI's Fight Back. They also covered the GI movement fairly frequently in their regular party press, Challenge and Challenge Bulletin. In West Germany, PLP was involved in a major showdown between GIs and the Army over a 1973 U.S. Army in Europe order authorizing strip searches, body cavity searches, unannounced 24-hour inspections, and the use of dogs in no-knock room searches, as well as the banning of anti-establishment or drug-related songs and posters; all in a crack down on suspected drug use. These policies backfired leading to a "resurgence of GI resistance" and legal battle against the Army led by a GI support group and the Lawyers Military Defense Committee which resulted in a judges order that most of the program be terminated. Even with the victory, however, much of the staff of FighT bAck, including several PLPers, were shipped to other areas.

One of the main campaigns PLP promoted during their work in the GI movement was the defense of Billy Dean Smith. Smith was an Army Private E-2 charged with tossing a grenade into an officers quarters at Bien Hoa Army Airfield on 15 March 1971, killing two officers in the 1st Cavalry Division (Airmobile). As the facts of the case emerged, however, it seemed someone else had thrown the grenade and the only evidence against Smith was a grenade pin which it turned out had come from a different type of grenade. Smith's defenders charged the Army with prosecuting him because he had been organizing within the Army "against his racist CO and the Army's being in Nam." Numerous antiwar, GI and veterans groups came to Smith's defense and he was, in fact, acquitted at a court martial in November 1972. PLP wrote in a 1975 summary of their GI work, "In every post throughout the world where we had cadre, leaflets, petitions and demonstrations appeared. In every united front from the GI Alliance in D.C., to the Ft. Devens United Front, to the FighT bAck organization in Germany, to the Ft. Hood United Front, and many others, PLP raised the fight for Smith's life as a life and death matter for all of us."

== Political cartoons and posters ==
Examples of political cartoons and posters carried in the GI underground press

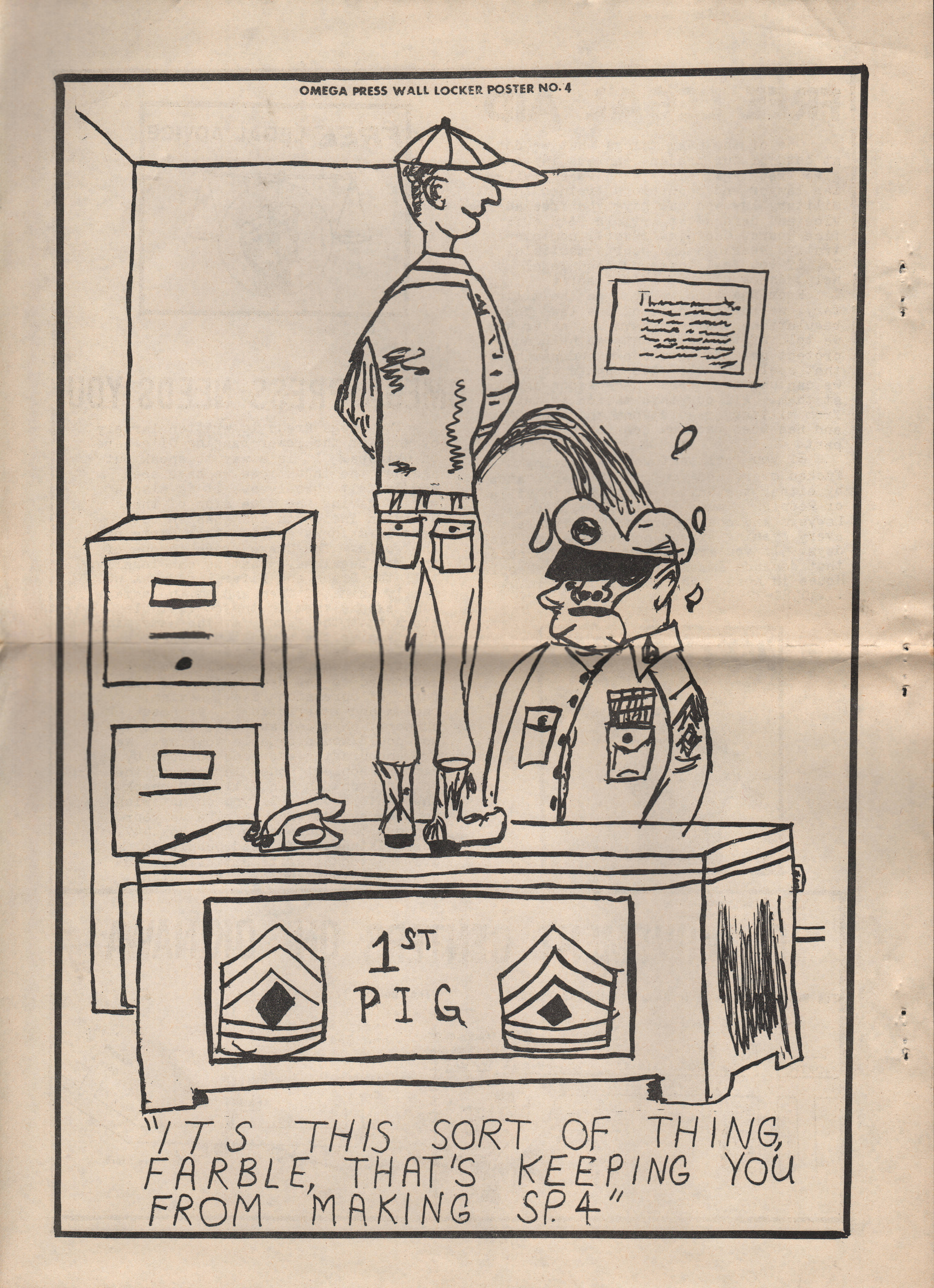

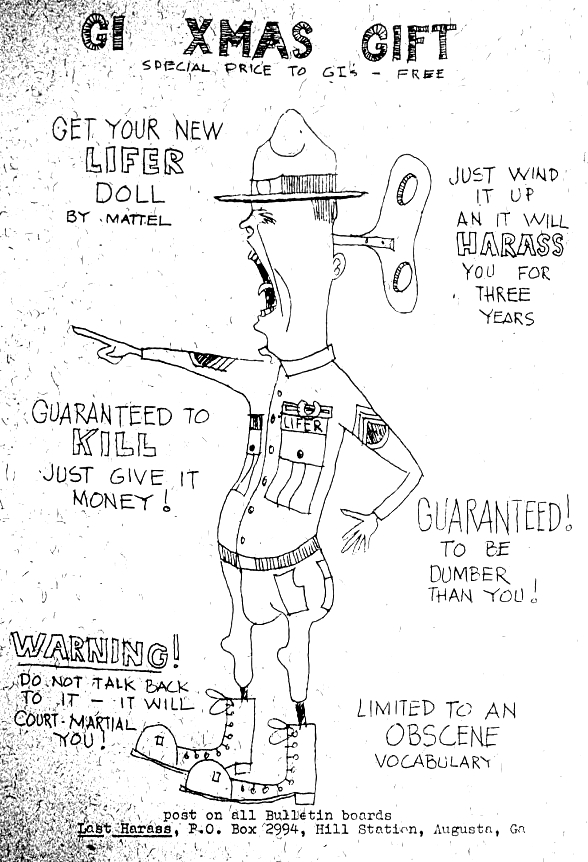

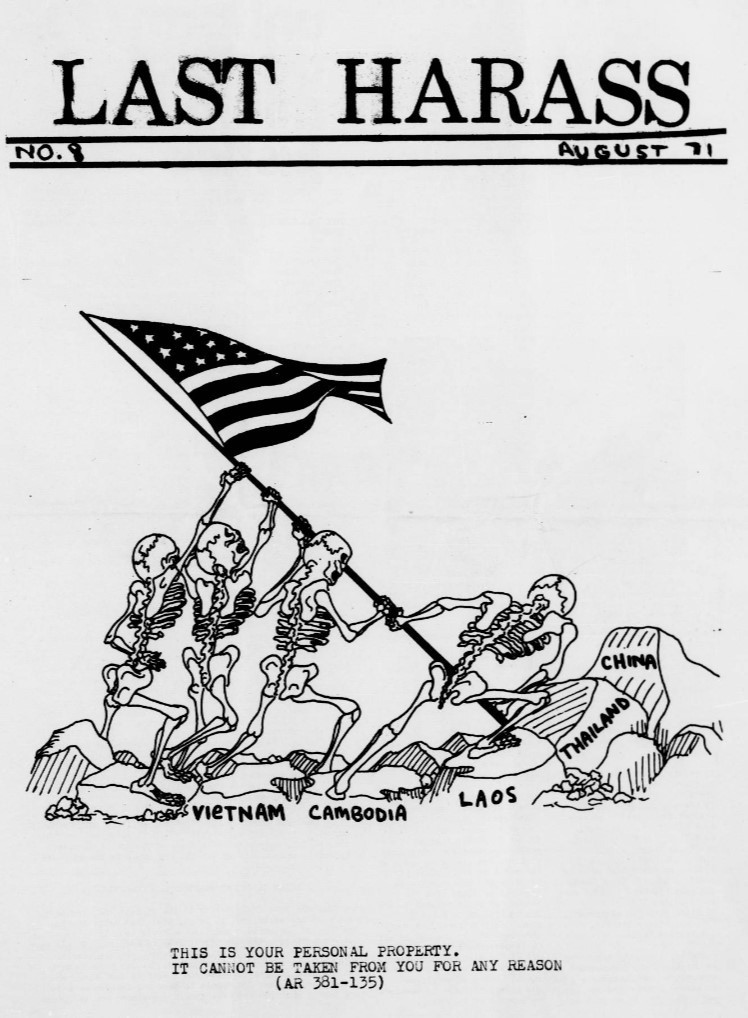

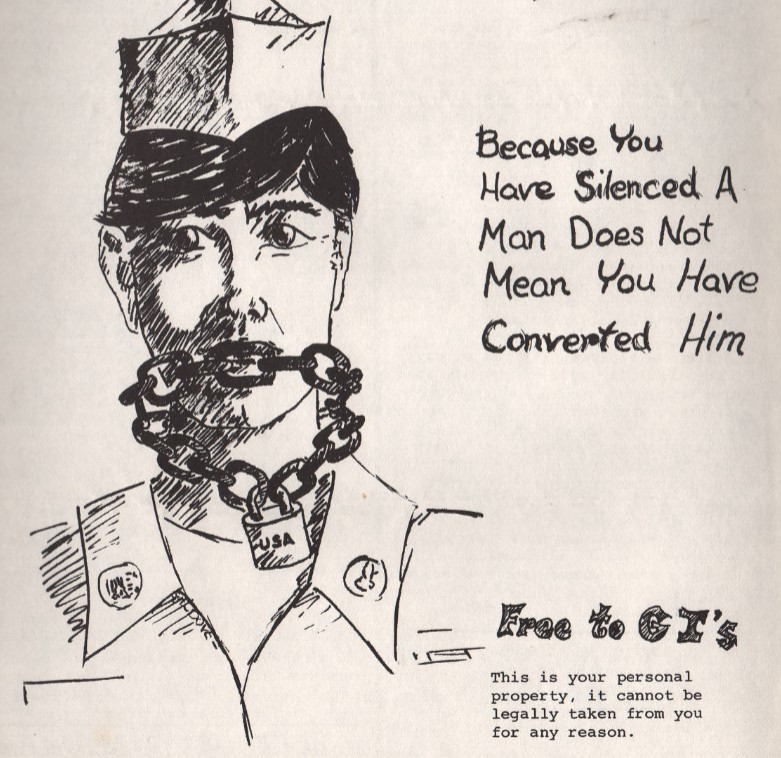

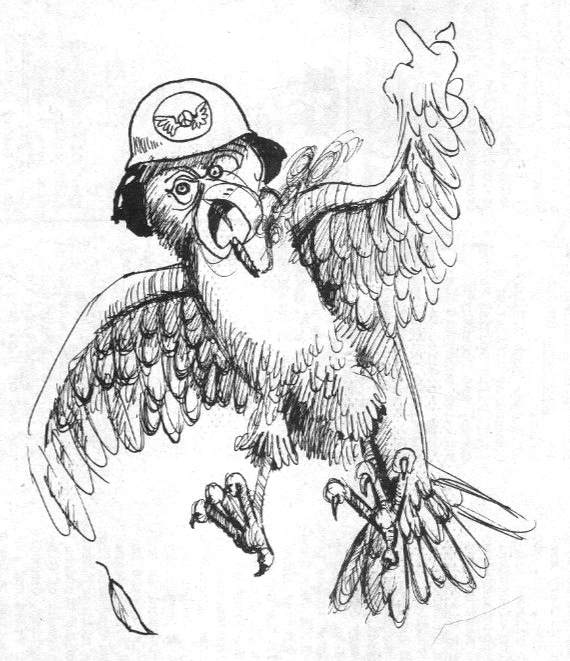

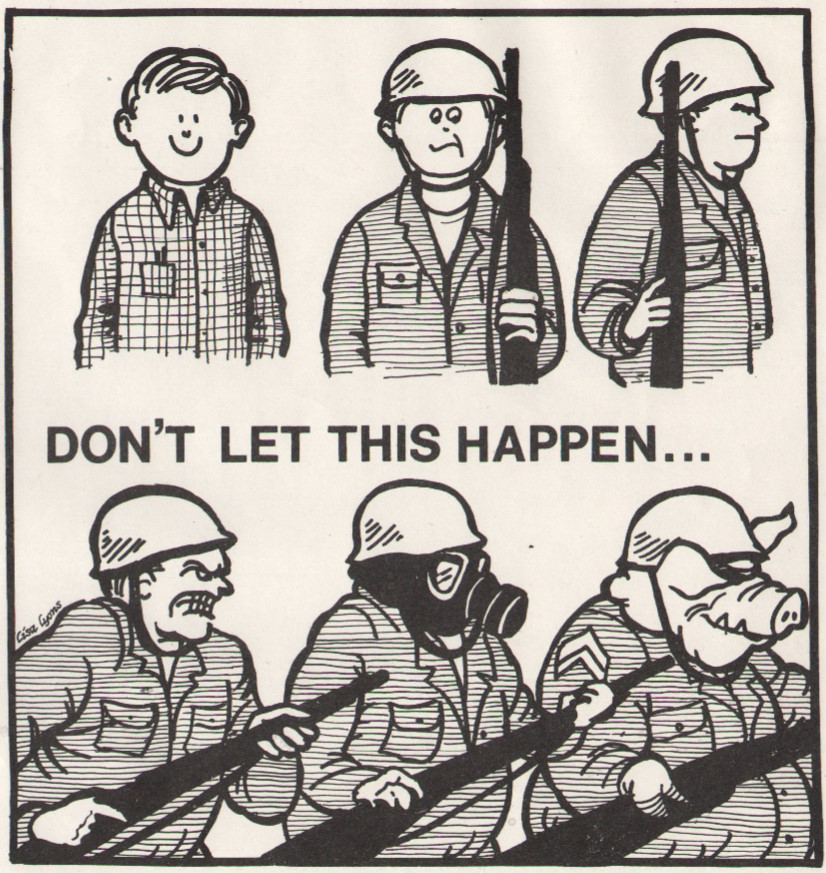

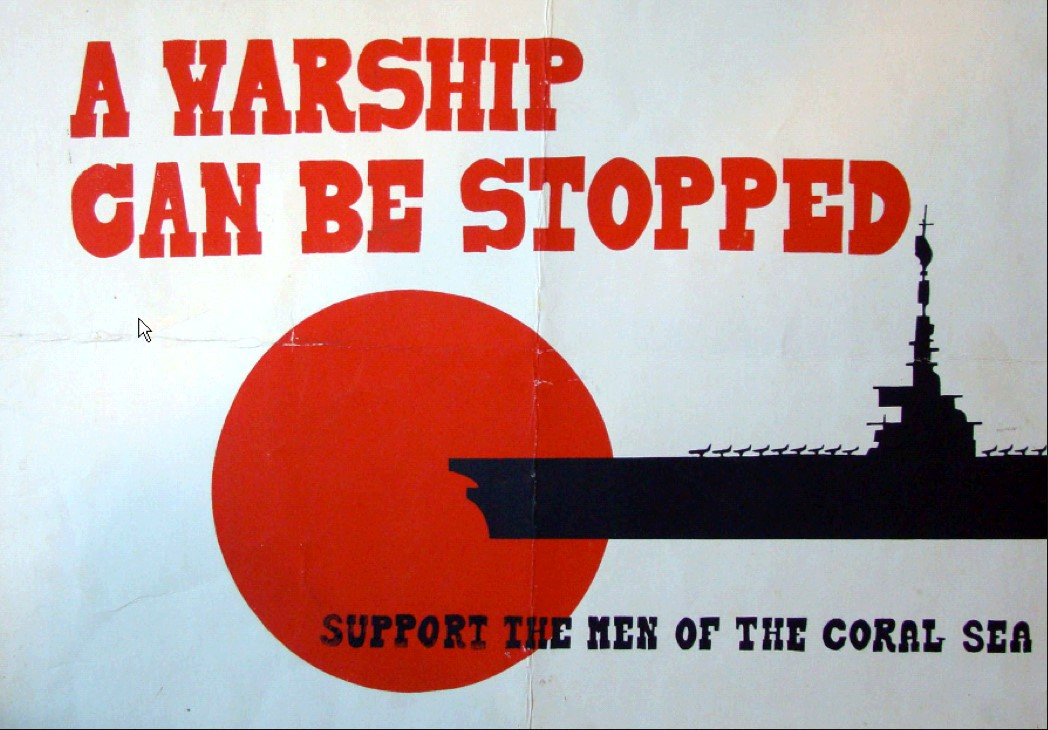

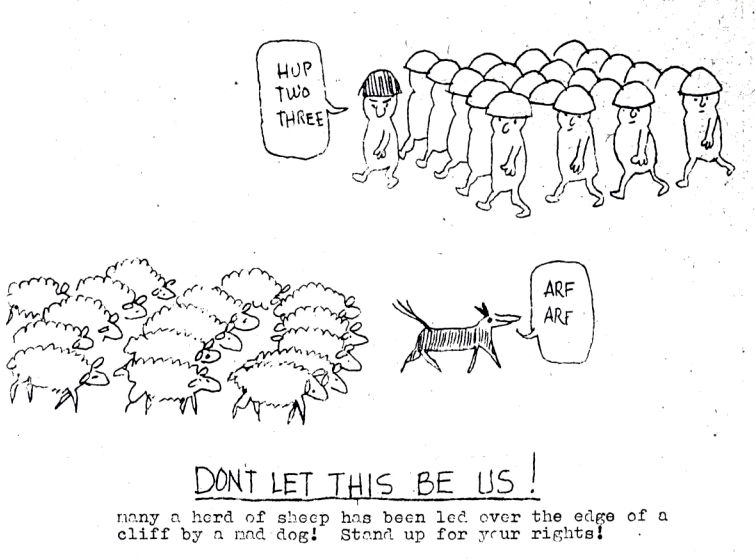

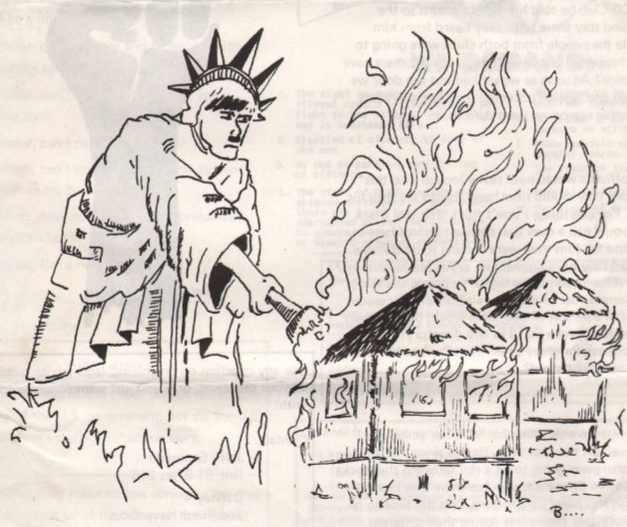

== All known issues of the GI underground press ==
| Name | Military Base/Ship | Location | Country | Known Issues | Start Date | End Date | Notes | Masthead |
|---|---|---|---|---|---|---|---|---|
| O4B Notes | Local US Bases | Augsburg | West Germany | 1 | 1976 Apr | 1976 Apr | By the Augsburg Soldiers Committee complaining about US Army recruitment lies. O4B refers to Interpreter-Translator Army job assignments which O4B claimed were falsely promised by recruiters. | |
| 1776 – Right to Revolution | Local US Bases | Okinawa | Japan | ? | 1972 | 1972 | Referenced in 1972 Congressional Hearings and Wachsberger. | No known copies. |
| 1st Amendment, The | Yokota Air Base | Fussa | Japan | 6 | 1971 Jul | 1972 May | "To defend the Constitution, we must insist on freedom of speech, freedom of press, freedom of thought and religion, must be avowed to the extermination of racism and sexism, must not accept anything less than the due process of law." | |
| 1st Casualty, The | US Bases and Veterans | New York, NY | US | 4 | 1971 Aug | 1972 Jul | By Vietnam Veterans Against the War for veterans and GIs. "In war, truth is the first casualty." | |
| 1st of the Worst | Fort Lewis | Tacoma, WA | US | 2 | 1970 May | 1970 ? | Written by men of A, B, C, D, HOW, HQ, and Air Cav. | |
| 99th Bummer | Westover Air Force Base | Chicopee, MA | US | 8 | 1971 Jul | 1972 May | Written and distributed by airmen, WAF's and their friends in the Westover Action Project. | |
| A Company Underground | Fort Lewis | Tacoma, WA | US | 2 | 1972 Mar | 1972 Apr | By 'A' Company for 'A' Company | |
| A Four-Year Bummer | Chanute Air Force Base | Champaign, IL | US | 16 | 1969 | 1971 Jan | This was the new name for Harass the Brass, to "avoid misinterpretation of the title". It called itself "The Airman's Voice" and asked the question, "How many Vietnamese fought in our Civil War?" They published a map of GI underground newspapers called "We are Not Alone". | |
| A'bout Face 1 | Patton, Coleman, Mannheim & Turley Barracks | Heidelberg & Mannheim | West Germany | 13 | 1970 Jun | 1971 Aug | A Black GI Publication by U.B.S. (United Brothers & Sisters or Unsatisfied Black Soldiers). "Stop the God Dam War!" No.6 Program of the Black Panther Party: "We want all Black men to be exempt from military service." | |
| A'bout Face 2 | Patton, Coleman, Mannheim, Turley Barracks & Mannheim Stockade | Heidelberg & Mannheim | West Germany | 4 | 1971 Sep | 1971 Dec | By the Black Disciple Party. "The time for revolution is obvious. We see as our major task the preparation of ourselves with a working knowledge of how to bring about this necessary (inevitable) revolution." | |
| Abolitionist, The | Local US Bases | Okinawa | Japan | ? | 1971 | 1971 | Referenced in Wachsberger and Shiratori. | No known copies. |
| About Face | Bergstrom Air Force Base | Austin, TX | US | 1 | 1971 | 1971 | The first issue said, "to give enlisted men a voice against the brass and a means to tell the public another point of view, other than that expressed by the official information office. We are concerned NCO's at Bergstrom who are tired of this one sided, fascist approach to running the military. We are not anti-America, we are FOR America, but we are not for a fascist military and we do not support the unlimited power congress has given the military today." | |
| About face! - The U.S. Servicemen's Fund Newsletter | All | New York, NY | US | 13 | 1971 May | 1973 Jun | The United States Servicemen's Fund (USSF) newsletter. The organization provided financial and logistical support for GI projects and newspapers from late 1968 through mid-1973. | |
| About Face: The EM News | Local Bases | Los Angeles, CA | US | 5 | 1969 Mar | 1969 Jul | GIs and Vietnam Vets Against the War. For enlisted men (Ems). | |
| Aboveground | Fort Carson | Colorado Springs, CO | US | 11 | 1969 Aug | 1970 May | The editors, publishers and writers were "SP5's Curt (This) Stocker and Tom (That) Roberts". Supported by GIs United, the Socialist Workers Party and the United States Servicemen's Fund (USSF). | |
| ACT – The RITA Newsletter | Local US Bases | Western Europe | NA | 7 | 1967 ? | 1971 ? | Written by deserters and resisters inside the Army (RITA) for the purpose of providing information to American servicemen. | |
| Action Bulletin | Local Bases | Chicago, IL | US | 3 | 1969 Mar | 1969 Mar | Organizing bulletins for the April 5, 1969 GI-Civilian national demonstrations, which included GIs and called for bringing the troops home. | |
| ADC Report | Deserters | Stockholm | Sweden | 3 | 1972 Nov? | 1973 Sep | By the American Deserters Committee. "US out of Indochina. Ending the war comes first." | |
| Aero-Spaced | Grissom Air Force Base | Kokomo, IN | US | 8 | 1969 Nov | 1970 | "You don't have to be in weather squadron to know which way the wind blows – adapted from Bob Dylan." | |
| AFA Notes | All | New York, NY | US | 7 | 1975 Jun? | 1976 Jan | Amnesty news by families for families. Fighting "for universal and unconditional amnesty for all draft law violators, military deserters, veterans with less than honorable discharges, and civilians with 'criminal' records or subject to prosecution because of their acts of opposition to the war." | |
| Air Fowl | Vandenberg Air Force Base | Vandenberg AFB, CA | US | 3 | 1971 | 1971 | "A new publication whose purpose is to provide an alternative to the pamphleteering of the military." By concerned GIs and veterans at Vandenberg. | |
| Air War | McChord Air Force Base | Tacoma, WA | US | 1 | 1972 | 1972 | Written by airmen of McChord Air Force Base. "We seek only friendship with the Vietnamese, and support their struggle for independence from foreign intervention. We must do everything within our power to stop the bombing and stop the war." | |
| Alabama-Mississippi Region VVAW News Letter | Local Vets & GIs | Alabama & Mississippi | US | 20 | 1972 | 1972 | A local newsletter of Vietnam Veterans Against the War. | |
| Alconbury Raps | R.A.F. Alconbury (USAF) | Huntingdon | England | 8 | 1971 May | 1972 | A US Air Force base was located at R.A.F. Alconbury and the paper was by and for Alconbury GIs. The second issue was put together during a meeting of 35 Alconbury GIs. They promoted a GI union. | |
| All Hands Abandon Ship | Newport Navy Base | Newport, RI | US | 29 | 1970 Jun | 1972 Dec | Started by a Navy psychiatrist at the base who saw a lot of sailors who described seeing problems that were with the Navy, not psychological. He and several of the sailors decided to create the paper. | |
| All Ready on the Left | Marine Corps Station Camp Pendleton | Oceanside, CA | US | 4 | 1970 Aug | 1971 Apr | Replaced Attitude Check GI paper. "Until all of us are free, none will be free." | |
| Ally, The | Alameda Naval Air Station & the Treasure Island Naval Station | San Francisco Bay Area | US | 43 | 1968 Feb | 1974 Jan | By citizens, reservists and Vietnam veterans. It stood out for being one of the few papers on a regular monthly publication schedule, running fairly consistently for over four years. It also distributed many copies to soldiers in Vietnam, often mailing them disguised as care packages from home where they were then passed hand to hand. | |
| Ambush | All | Canada | Canada | 1 | 1970? | 1970? | Advice from US military deserters about desertion and resistance. They advised, "Desertions give the opportunity for fulltime work against the military." | |
| American Deserters Committee Newsletter | Deserters & Resisters | Paris | France | 1 | 1969 Apr | 1969 Apr | "To keep all deserters and resisters in France informed of our activities. We inform GIs still in the US military and give then alternatives." | |
| American Exile In Britain | All | London | England | 12 | 1969 Mar | 1974 Sep | By the Union of American Exiles in Britain. For US GIs, deserters and veterans in England. | |
| American Exile in Canada, The | Exiles | Canada | Canada | 15 | 1968 ? | 1969 May | The Union of American Exiles' journal of news and opinion. | |
| American Exile Newsletter | Exiles | Stockholm | Sweden | 49 | 1972 Oct | 1977 Sep | By the American Exile Project, the Center for American Exiles and the American Exile Club for US military GIs, deserters, draft resisters and all members of the American war resisters community in Sweden. | |
| American War Resister in Sweden | Exiles | Stockholm | Sweden | 8 | 1972 Jun | 1972 Feb | For American deserters, resisters and exiles living in Sweden. | |
| AMEX | Exiles | Canada | Canada | 47 | 1968 | 1977 Sep | Started as the newsletter of the Union of American Exiles. News of draft dodgers and deserters from across Canada. Included advice on how to desert and not get caught. | |
| AMEX-Canada | Exiles | Toronto, Ontario | Canada | 16 | 1968 | 1969 | By and for the American expatriate in Canada. Supported draft resisters, deserters and AWOL GIs. | |
| AMPO | Local US Bases & Japanese New Left | Tokyo | Japan | 10 | 1969 Dec? | 1971 Nov? | Extensive coverage in English of antiwar work between the Japanese new left and dissident US GIs. Supported by the Pacific Counseling Service. | |
| Anchorage Troop | Fort Richardson | Anchorage, Alaska | US | 4 | 1970 Jan | 1970 Mar | It was "produced by and for GIs in the vicinity of Anchorage." "We desire to help develop this knowledge toward a comprehensive awareness that the Military is an oppressive, exploitative, racist, imperialistic, neo-fascist, and organizationally insane system." | |
| Anti*Brass | Local Bases | Los Angeles, CA | US | 3 | 1970 | 1971 | By the Military Law Panel of the National Lawyers Guild. To serve the needs of the military man, regular/reserve/ROTC, who has or may have a legal problem with the military. | |
| Anti-NATO '74 | NATO Military Bases | Amsterdam | The Netherlands | 5 | 1974 May | 1974 Nov | Bulletin for Anti-NATO soldiers conference in November 1974 in Amsterdam. Organizing soldiers against militarism. | |
| Antithesis | Deserters | Montreal | Canada | 1 | 1970 | 1970 | Forum of the American Deserters Committee. To provide immigration counseling, housing and general aid to deserters and draft resistors from the US armed forces arriving in Canada. | |
| Arctic Arsenal, The | Fort Greely | Fairbanks, Alaska | US | 3 | 1971 | 1971 | "The Arctic Arsenal is your newspaper – written by and for GI's on this post." It "will be a weapon to use against an Army which distorts the lives of us all, if it doesn't get us killed first." By Socialist Workers and GIs United at Fort Greely | |
| As You Were | Fort Ord | San Francisco Bay Area | US | 13 | 1969 Apr | 1970 Apr | The longest running paper at Fort Ord, it billed itself as "a newspaper of common sense and survival for GIs." The August 1969 issue encouraged GIs to give their friends some relief from the long hot summer by sprinkling copies of As You Were on them. | |
| Ash | Dänner Kaserne US Army Garrison | Kaiserslautern | West Germany | 1 | 1972 | 1972 | Only one issue known. Crude mimeographed 4 pages by GIs at the garrison. "Ash is directed against the apathy that allows war to continue. Peace." | |
| Assistance Co-Ordination Bulletin | Deserters | Canada | Canada | 5 | 1968 ? | 1968 Sep | Advice and information for people assisting GI deserters from the US military. | |
| Attitude Check | Marine Corps Station Camp Pendleton | Oceanside, CA | US | 7 | 1969 Nov | 1970 Jun | Written by and for Marines at "CamPen". By the Movement for a Democratic Military | |
| AWOL Press, The | Fort Riley | Manhattan, KS | US | 20 | 1969 | 1970 | Most issues undated. It called itself "The Underground GI Newspaper". | |
| B Company Unbridled Voice | Fort Lewis | Tacoma, WA | US | 2 | 1972 Mar | 1972 Apr | By GIs of 'B' Company. | |
| Bacon, The | Norton Air Force Base | San Bernardino, CA | US | 1 | 1972 Jun | 1972 Jun | The issue was printed inside a mockup of the Norton AFB regular newspaper, the Beacon. By MOM & POP (March on March + Peace Our Purpose). "From the Pig come the bacon." | |
| Barrage | Fort Still & Lawton Air Force Station | Lawton, OK | US | 5 | 1971 Oct | 1972 Apr | Produced by the Lawton Fort Still Area United Front: "GIs, women, Native Americans, Black people, Mexican-Americans, freaks, high school and college students, and working people." | |
| Baumholder Gig Sheet, The | Baumholder Army Airfield | Paris | France | 1 | 1969 | 1969 | By American Servicemen's Union Local 034. "Organizing GIs into a single voice to speak out against the injustices found within the military." | |
| Bayonet, The | 353d PSYOP Battalion | San Francisco Bay Area | US | 1 | 1969 Oct | 1969 Oct | For the men of the 353d PSYOP Battalion and other Bay Area reservists by the GI Association. "The nation's resources are being squandered on a reserve training program which does not benefit the military, the reservists or society." | |
| BCT Newsletter | Fort Ord | San Francisco Bay Area | US | ? | 1970 | 1970 | The BCT Newsletter (with BCT standing for Basic Combat Training) seems to have come out in 1970. It has only been referenced in Wachsberger. | No known copies. |
| Below Decks | Subic Bay Naval Station | Olangapo | Philippines | 3 | 1970 | 1970 | Created by Mark Flint and Barry while they were stationed at Subic Bay. They were only able to publish three issues because the Navy quickly discharged one of them and sent the other to a Carrier in the South China Sea. | No known copies. |
| Bergstrom Bennies | Bergstrom Air Force Base | Austin, TX | US | ? | 1971 | 1972 | Bennies refers to benefits. Referenced in 1972 Congressional Hearings and Wachsberger. | No known copies. |
| Black Tribunal for Awareness and Progress, The | Overseas US Bases | West Germany | West Germany | 1 | 1971 Nov | 1971 Nov | To Black Brothers stationed overseas. "Dedicated to the plight of the now Black man in a racist, capitalist scheme of this White immoral society." | |
| Black Unity | Marine Corps Station Camp Pendleton | Oceanside, CA | US | 2 | 1970 Aug | 1970 Sep | "We want all Black people to be exempt from Military Service." "We will not fight and kill other people of color in the world who, like Black people, are victimized by the white racist government of America." | |
| Black Voice | Fort McClellan | Anniston, AL | US | ? | 1971 | 1972 | Referenced in 1972 Congressional Hearings and Wachsberger. | No known copies. |
| Blue Screw | Lowry Air Force Base | Aurora, CO | US | 7 | 1973 May | 1974 Jan | "We are Active Duty Gl's who are subject to the same injustices as you. As members of the United States Armed Forces, we are forced to fight for and uphold, without-question (so they hope), this system that makes the rich richer and the poor poorer. We are the GI Movement. We are everywhere!!" | |
| Bolling Other | Bolling Air Force Base | Washington, DC | US | ? | 1971 | 1972 | Referenced in 1972 Congressional Hearings and Wachsberger. | No known copies. |
| Bond, The | All | Berkeley, CA; New York, NY | US | 77 | 1967 Jun | 1974 Oct | The servicemen's newspaper "to address dissatisfaction with the war in Vietnam, racism in America and the functioning of American society generally." In 1968 it became the paper of the American Servicemen's Union. | |
| Boomerang Barb, The | 191st Assault Helicopter Company | Bearcat, near Long Thanh North | Vietnam | 4 | 1968 | 1968 | The "Hip Underground Newspaper of the 191st". Written by soldiers Mike Morrison and Mike Jackson. | |
| Boston Draft Resistance Group Newsletter | Fort Devens | Boston, MA | US | 4 | 1967 Jun | 1969 Apr | Reporting on draft resistance work and antiwar work among GIs in the local area. They went to the Greyhound bus depot to talk to soldiers returning to Fort Devens. | |
| Bragg Briefs | Fort Bragg | Fayetteville, NC | US | 41 | 1969 Jul | 1975 | Started by GIs United. GIs: "Caution! Reading this Paper May be Hazardous to Your Discipline, Morale & Loyalty." On-post circulation of over 7,000. | |
| Brass Needle, The | Fort Lee | Petersburg, VA | US | ? | 1971 | 1971 | Listed in FTA : Fun Travel Adventure and referenced in Wachsberger | No known copies. |
| Bridge, The | Butzbach Prison | Butzbach | West Germany | 16 | 1972 ? | 1974 May | Advocated for US military personnel in Butzbach Prisons and fought for US GI rights. | |
| Broadside | Local Navy Bases | Los Angeles, CA | US | ? | 1968 | 1968 | Referenced in Wachsberger. | No known copies. |
| Broken Arrow | Selfridge Air Force Base | Harrison Township, MI | US | 17 | 1969 | 1971 Apr | Published by the American Servicemen's Union. The beginning of "an attempt to deal effectively with the efforts of the brass on Selfridge Air Force Base to suppress freedom!" They apologized for some obscenities used in the paper like, "air force, brass, lifer, war, kill, gun" etc. | |
| B-Troop News | Fort Lewis | Tacoma, WA | US | 4 | 1970 | 1970 | "Are lifers immature? Yes, ask B Troop." | |
| California Veteran, The | Local Recruiting Stations | Los Angeles, CA | US | 2 | 1971 | 1971 | By the California Veterans Movement and Vietnam Veterans Against the War. Went to recruiting stations to tell prospective GIs "what was really going on" in Vietnam and in the military. | |
| Call Up! | Patton Barracks | Heidelberg | West Germany | 1 | 1970 Sep | 1970 Sep | Soldiers for Democratic Action. "We are a group of white soldiers here at Patton Barracks who know there is a very great problem with racism and that Black and white liberation groups need to work together against a common enemy." | |
| Camp News | All | Chicago, IL | US | 37 | 1970 Feb | 1973 Aug | Chicago Area Military Project. Created by members of Students for a Democratic Society to support GI organization and resistance. Became a clearing house for GI antiwar and resistance news providing material for many GI newspapers. | |
| Can You Bear McNair? | McNair Kaserne | Frankfurt | West Germany | 4 | ? | 1971 Mar | Written by GIs on McNair. "Defending American business profits in Europe is not compatible with the interest of young workers in uniform – the enlisted men." | |
| Catharsis | Quonset Point Air National Guard Station | Boston, MA | US | 3 | 1970 Aug | 1970 ? | Quonset-Davisville GI's for Peace formed to oppose the war in Southeast Asia and give GIs an outlet to express their views. | |
| CCCO News Notes | GIs & Draftees | Philadelphia, PA | US | Many | 1949 | To Date | By the Central Committee for Conscientious Objectors. Many issues contained advice for GIs seeking discharge for conscientious objection. | |
| Center Newsletter | Exiles | Stockholm | Sweden | 3 | 1971 May | 1971 Jul | The center was a resistance coffeehouse in Stockholm for US deserters and resisters. Their newsletter provided news and information to the community. | |
| Challenge | All | New York, NY | US | 40+ | 1967 | 1975 | Challenge is the newspaper of the Progressive Labor Party. They ran a number of articles about the GI movement and resistance during the Vietnam War, including articles written by GIs. | |
| Challenge Bulletin | Fort Ord | San Francisco Bay Area | US | 6 | 1972 | 1972 | Put out by Challenge newspaper of the Progressive Labor Party. | |
| Chessman | Beaufort Air Station & Parris Island Marine Recruit Depot | Beaufort, NC | US | 1 | 1969 Jul | 1969 Jul | By Marines for Marines. "Are you only a pawn in their game?" | |
| Chessman II | Beaufort Air Station & Parris Island Marine Recruit Depot | Beaufort, NC | US | 2 | 1971 | 1971 Nov | Printed two years after Chessman by and for Marines at Beaufort Air Station and Parris Island. "I ain't gwine study war no mo'!" | |
| Chickenshit Weekly | Fort Bliss | El Paso, TX | US | 2 | 1972 | 1972 | The first issue announced, "Are you tired of the same old 'Chickenshit? So are we..." Then the second issue said, "The response to last week's was overwhelming; we received one bomb threat and a nasty gram. However, we still mean to tell it like it is." No more seem to have been published. | |
| Chicksands D.I.T.S. (Dignity In The Service) | R.A.F. Chicksands (USAF) | Bedford | England | 1 | 1971 Juil | 1971 Jul | Written "for a better understanding" by Airmen of Chicksands. | |
| Coalition, The | Mather Air Force Base | Sacramento, CA | US | 3 | 1972 Jan | 1972 Apr | Sacramento area GI paper. In the Air Force, "no matter what our job, we are in some way connected with the war effort. Now is the time to face this problem." | |
| Co-Ambulation | Fairchild Air Force Base | Spokane, WA | US | 1 | 1971 Aug | 1971 Aug | Newsletter of the Concerned Officer – Airman Movement. Contained numerous signed articles and statements from officers and airmen against the war and the military. | |
| Cockroach | Minot Air Force Base | Minot, ND | US | ? | 1971 | ? | Reported in Camp News. By an active-duty GI. | No known copies. |
| Coffeehouse News | Local Bases | San Francisco Bay Area | US | 1 | 1969 Feb | 1969 Feb | Affiliated with Support our Soldiers (SOS) which supported GI coffeehouses and underground newspapers and was affiliated with the United States Servicemen's Fund (USSF). Cited in Lewes Protest & Survive and Displaced Films | |
| Column Left | Vets & GIs | Buffalo, NY | US | 7 | 1970 Mar | 1973 Apr | By the Veterans Club at the University of Buffalo. Advocated a radical program for vets and GIs to "unite with all other working people to organize and fight this system." | |
| COM Newsletter | All | Washington, DC | US | 4 | 1970 | 1970 | The Concerned Officers' Movement was formed by a group of active duty and reserve officers who "could no longer continue to be passive, unquestioning agents of military and national policies they found untenable." | |
| COM Newsletter (Hawaii) | Local Bases | Pearl City, HI | US | 1 | 1971 | 1971 | By the Concerned Officers Movement Hawaii. Exact title unknown. No known copies. Mentioned in COMmon Sense. | No known copies. |
| Combat Ethnic Weapons | Local Area | San Francisco Bay Area | US | 1 | 1971 | 1971 | By the Coalition Opposed to Medical and Biological Attack, which included several GI groups antiwar groups. Demanded "the destruction of all US chemical and biological weapons." | |
| Come-Unity Press | Yokota Air Base | Yokota | Japan | 2 | 1972 Nov | 1972 Dec | Pacific Counseling Service. Referenced in US Senate 1976 hearings and Wachsberger. | No known copies. |
| COMmon Sense | All | Washington, DC | US | 3 | 1971 | 1972 | By the Concerned Officers Movement (COM), a progressive organization of active duty, reserve and retired officers of the Armed Forces of the US demanding immediate withdrawal from Southeast Asia. | |
| Confinee Says | Marine Corps Station Camp Pendleton | Oceanside, CA | US | 1 | 1970 | 1970 | This paper was written and smuggled out of the Camp Pendleton brig by brig rats in order to "off the brig" and help restore the "power to the people!" | |
| Cosmic Flash, The | Local US Bases | West Germany | West Germany | 2 | 1970 | 1970 | A drug help newsletter for local GIs and other put out by Project Help. | |
| Counter-Attack! | Fort Carson | Colorado Springs, CO | US | 5 | 1970 | 1971 | By the Movement for a Democratic Military and the Home Front Coffeehouse. "The last thing the military wants is for its men to be politically aware of and half-truths that the brass and the pig administration put to the people." | |
| Counterdraft | Draftees & Counselors | Los Angeles, CA | US | 25 | 1968 | 1971 May | By the Counterdraft Committee of Peace Action Council for draft resisters, counselors and resisting GIs. Resist! Always Resist! | |
| Counter-Military | Marine Corps Air Station Iwakuni | Iwakuni | Japan | 2 | 1971 | 1971 | Pacific Counseling Service. Referenced US Senate 1976 hearings and in Wachsberger. | No known copies. |
| Counterpoint | Fort Lewis & McChord Air Force Base | Tacoma, WA | US | 26 | 1968 Oct | 1969 Sep | It started at Fort Lewis and expanded to McChord later. It was the newsletter of the GI-Civilian Alliance for Peace. "We welcome anyone who opposes the war - democrats, socialists, republicans, pacifists, etc.- but at the same time no group should dominate." | |
| Cry Out | Clark Air Base | Luzon Island | Philippines | 4 | 1972 Jan | 1972 Jun | "I am a GI rebel, As brave as I can be, And I don't like the A.F. brass, and generals don't like me. Join the GI Movement." | |
| Custer's Last Stand | Fort Riley | Manhattan, KS | US | 4 | 1972 | 1972 Sep | Custer's Last Stand is "dedicated to create an end to the anti-human attitudes that the Army uses when dealing with its members." | |
| Dare to Struggle | Local Bases | San Diego, CA | US | 10 | 1970 | 1971 | By the Movement for a Democratic Military. "We support the self-determination of all people." | |
| Demand for Freedom | Kadena Air Base | Kadena, Okinawa | Japan | 5 | 1970 Oct | 1971 | Black GI paper. "All power to the Third World. Power to all oppressed people." | |
| Destroyer, The | Local bases | Philadelphia, PA | US | 9 | 1970 Sep | 1971 Oct | By a group of Philadelphia area sailors and marines. "By this our minds have been freed from the involuntary servitude of the military machine." | |
| Dickey Goober's Other Voice | Richards-Gebaur Air Force Station | Kansas City, MO | US | 4 | 1972 Mar | 1972 Aug | "What we have here is a failure to communicate! Is this Hogan's Heroes, Catch-22 or what? No, this is the real life Air Force right here at Dickey Goober." | |
| Different Drummer | Fort Polk | Vernon Parish, LA | US | 3 | 1971? | 1971 Jul | It called itself "the most 'illegal' legal newspaper you'll ever read." It was the successor to the Fort Polk Puke | |
| Dig It! | Local US Bases | Mainz am Rhein | West Germany | 1 | 1971 | 1971 | Armed Services Union (ASU). "Military justice is to justice as military music is to music." | |
| Do It Loud | Fort Bragg | Fayetteville, NC | US | 1 | 1970 Feb | 1970 Feb | The Black Brigade. "Established to represent the Black man within the military in directing demands for measures to be expeditiously taken against racism." | |
| Duck Power | Local Navy Bases | San Diego, CA | US | 15 | 1969 Aug | 1970 Aug | By GIs Against Fascism which merged with the Movement for a Democratic Military "in the interest of the enlisted man." | |
| Dull Brass | Fort Sheridan | Lake County, IL | US | 8 | 1969 Apr | 1970 | Replaced The Logistic when many of the staff were punitively transferred "to hell and back." | |
| EM-16 | Fort Campbell & Fort Knox | Radcliff, KY | US | 1 | 1970 Mar | 1970 Mar | EM stands for enlisted men, 16 for the M-16 rifle. The editors called the paper "a weapon for GIs in struggle." It was published by black and white GIs, mostly Vietnam veterans, as well as GI wives. Two of the editors were members of the Progressive Labor Party. The paper claimed that "Readers will see the difference between EM-16 and FTA, which we feel has outlived its usefulness." FTA was the other paper at the base at the time. EM-16 critiqued it for having "pacifist, drug-oriented, and escapist notions". | |
| ETA—Eat The Apple | Marine Corps Reserves | Detroit, MI | US | 6 | 1969 ? | 1970 Mar | By Marine Reserves in No More War, Inc. "The US Marine Corps has no right to exist." | |
| Every GI is a P.O.W. | Fort Ord | San Francisco Bay Area | US | 9 | 1971 Mar | 1972 | The first issue said it was put out by and for GIs at Fort Ord and that the editors saw it as "an important first step in building a GI movement which will get the Brass off our backs forever." | |
| Exile Notes | Exiles | Canada | Canada | 1 | 1973 Oct? | 1973 Oct? | Newsletter of Vancouver American Exiles' Association. For deserters and draft resisters from the US military. | |
| Exile Report | Exiles | Quebec | Canada | 1 | 1971 Mar | 1971 Mar | For exiles, deserters and draft resisters, from the US military. | |
| Exnet Bulletin | Exiles | Canada | Canada | 29 | 1970? | 1971 Jun | Advice for deserters and draft resisters from the US military, and for those helping. | |
| Exposure | Patch Barracks | Stuttgart | West Germany | 2 | 1971 | 1971 May | A Black GI Publication of the Black Soldiers Alliance (BSA). Through Exposure "we will voice your opinions and feelings; expose the white racist for what he is." | |
| Eyes Left | Travis Air Force Base | San Francisco Bay Area | US | 7 | 1969 May | 1969 Dec | The first paper to appear at Travis with seven issues coming out in 1969. It was published by Air Force reservists, who asked their fellow reservists in the first issue, "What has happened to us?" The answer: "To put it very bluntly, we have been screwed". It offered advice like, "Short hair makes you sterile..." and information such as the definition of Imperialism, "The policy, practice, or advocacy of seeking to extend the control, dominion, or empire of a nation." | |
| Eyes Right | Fort Knox | Fort Knox, KY | US | 1 | 1969 Jul | 1969 Jul | The only known rightwing underground GI newspaper. It published one issue on July 4, 1969. They said their purpose was "to editorially oppose the GI movement and any other movement that is destructive in nature or detrimental to the best interests of the nation that so many GIs have died for." Rightwing underground papers were very rare, perhaps because the regular press generally supported the war and pro-Vietnam war right-wingers didn't feel the need for their own extra publications. | |
| Fall In At Ease | Local US Bases | Tokyo | Japan | 20 | 1970 | 1973 | Previously We Got The BrASS. Worked with Pacific Counseling Service. | |
| Fat Albert's Death Ship Times | Charleston Naval Base | Charleston, SC | US | 5 | 1972 | 1973 Jun | The first issue said, "With tears, laughter, horrible hassles, and a lotta help from friends; a group of airmen, sailors, and marines have made this paper." The editors called themselves the Defense Committee: "an organization of enlisted men, women, their families, and civilian supporters. We're like a union, working for the rights and a better life for all enlisted people and dependents." Among their principles were, "an end to military racism and sexism", and "against fighting any more wars like the one in Vietnam...[that are] only for the benefit of Big Business." | |
| Fatigue Press | Fort Hood | Killeen, TX | US | 43 | 1968 | 1972 Jul | "one of the most consistently successful organizations of the GI movement." In April 1972 over 1,200 GIs signed a petition demanding an immediate end to the war. | |
| Favorite Sons | Vets & GIs | San Bernardino, CA | US | 4 | 1972 | 1972 | By Vietnam Veterans Against the War in California, Hawaii and Nevada. Defended Billy Dean Smith, a black man charged with fragging two officers in Vietnam. | |
| Fed Up! | Fort Lewis | Tacoma, WA | US | 21 | 1969 Oct | 1973 Dec | Created by soldiers with the American Servicemen's Union (ASU). Shortly after the first issue 36 GIs were arrested by the Military Police in the middle of an ASU meeting. They continued meeting in their 8-foot by 8-foot prison cell while awaiting interrogation. None of them cooperated with the "brass" and "the lifers gave up after interrogating only half the guys. Everyone was then released back to his company." | |
| FID | Kodiak Naval & Coast Guard Stations | Kodiak, Alaska | US | 7 | 1971 Mar | 1971 Oct | A FID is a traditional sailor's tool from the early days of sailing used with knots and ropes. This "sailor's tool" was the monthly newsletter of the Concerned Servicemen's Movement, "...a coalition of coast guard and navy officers and enlisted men who have begun meeting regularly to rap about problems that concern us as servicemen and citizens." | |
| FighT bAck | Patton, Coleman, Mannheim & Turley Barracks | Heidelberg & Mannheim | West Germany | 53 | 1972 Oct | 1980 Aug | "All US troops out of Europe." Advocated sending radical organizers into the military to organize resistance. | |
| Fight Back (Long Beach) | Long Beach Naval Station & Naval Shipyard | Long Beach, CA | US | 3 | 1972 | 1972 | "Free to all GIs and other POWs." | |
| Fight Back! – The Drydock Newspaper | Long Beach Navy Shipyard | Long Beach, CA | US | 3 | 1973 Dec | 1974 Mar | By the G.I. Rights and Information Center to provide :a source of information and a vehicle for free expression for those active-duty people who find themselves forced to live and work in a highly repressive and inhuman military machine." | |
| Fight Back! (Chicago) | Reserves & National Guard | Chicago, IL | US | 1 | ? | ? | Reserve and National Guard Organizing Committee flyer announcing meeting and a newspaper. It's unclear whether it materialized. | |
| Final Flight, The | Hamilton Air Force Base | San Francisco Bay Area | US | 19 | 1969 May | 1971 Apr | Written and published Underground by Airmen at Hamilton AFB | |
| First Amendment | Fort Wayne | Detroit, MI | US | 2 | 1970 May | 1970 ? | "We are GIs dedicated to the eventual abolition of the war machinery, the rights of GIs to speak freely about the war, and the eventual equality of all persons." | |
| First Amendment (Indianapolis) | Local Bases | Indianapolis, IN | US | ? | 1970? | 1970? | Mentioned in GI Press Service. | No known copies. |
| Flag-in-Action | Fort Campbell | Hopkinsville, KY & Clarksville, TN | US | 3 | 1968 Nov | 1969 | Published "(unhappily but necessarily) 'underground'" by Fort Campbell GIs "to tell it like it is." | |
| Fort Bragg Free Press, The | Fort Bragg | Fayetteville, NC | US | ? | 1969 | 1969 | Referenced in Wachsberger. | No known copies. |
| Fort Bragg Rag | Fort Bragg | Fayetteville, NC | US | 1 | 1970 | 1970 | The first of the ten commandments "Army Style" was listed as "Thou shalt not think." | |
| Fort Bragg Sick Slip, The | Fort Bragg | Fayetteville, NC | US | 3 | 1969 | 1969 | GIs United. "What is it with the officers? Do they all massage their necks with their sphincters (those are the muscles that cut your turd in half)?" | |
| Fort Lewis Free Press | Fort Lewis | Tacoma, WA | US | 1 | 1970 Aug | 1970 Aug | "...dedicated to peace, justice, and freedom to all, including those being held without their consent on active duty in the United States Armed Forces." Became the Lewis-McChord Free Press. | |
| Fort Polk GI Voice | Fort Polk | Vernon Parish, LA | US | 1 | 1968? | 1968? | "The war in Vietnam is the most important question today. We believe the US should get the hell out." | |
| Fort Polk Puke | Fort Polk | Vernon Parish, LA | US | 2 | ? | 1971 Jun | The base created a Vietnam training area called Tigerland. More soldiers were shipped to Vietnam from Fort Polk than from any other American training base. | |
| Fort Riley Chapter of ASU | Fort Riley | Manhattan, KS | US | 2 | 1970 | 1970 | By the American Servicemens Union. "We demand the right to refuse the illegal order to fight in the illegal, imperialist war in Southeast Asia." | |
| Forward | Local US Bases | West Berlin | West Germany | 65 | 1971 | 1978 Nov | Previously Up Against the Wall. Renamed to be less aggressive. By GIs, American and German civilians at the GI Counseling Centre in West Berlin. | |
| Forward March of American Idealism | Local Bases | Annapolis, MD | US | 2 | 1969 Nov | 1969 Nov | By the GI Press Service of the Student Mobilization Committee to End the War in Vietnam. "Thanks to napalm it's now possible to take the ovens to the people rather than the people to the ovens." | |
| Fragging Action | Fort Dix & McGuire Air Force Base | New Jersey | US | 7 | 1971 May | 1972 Jun | First issue directed to Fort Dix, but by second also included McGuire. They wrote, "Our views will never coincide with the Department of Defense or the army, and their ideas do not coincide with ours." The Progressive Labor Party supported this paper for a while. | |
| Free Fire Zone | Hanscom Air Force Base | Bedford, MA | US | 4 | 1971 Dec | 1972 Apr | The first issue stated its "primary purposes are to publicize the problems of GIs at Hanscom Field and to present an alternative opinion about the use of violence and the exercise of power in this country and in its armed forces." | |
| Freedom Now For Lt. Howe Newsletter | Fort Leavenworth | Leavenworth, KS | US | 2 | 1966 Apr | 1966 Jul | Army Second Lieutenant Henry H. Howe was the first soldier imprisoned for marching in a peace demonstration against the war in Vietnam. These newsletters were one of the first GI related underground publications. | |
| Freedom of the Press | USS Midway | Yokosuka | Japan | 21 | 1973 ? | 1974 Aug | Printed by Vietnam Veterans Against the War/Winter Soldier Organization for GIs. | |
| Freedom Rings! | Local US Bases | Tokyo | Japan | 1 | 1970 Aug | 1970 Aug | Produced by GIs in the Tokyo area by the Pacific Counseling Service. | |
| Ft. Dix 38 Speak-Out | Fort Dix | New Jersey | US | 2 | 1969 Aug | 1969 Nov | By the American Servicemen's Union and the committee to Free the Ft. Dix 38, who were charged with riot and arson after a stockade rebellion/riot of hundreds of imprisoned GIs at Fort Dix. | |
| FTA with Pride | Patton, Coleman, Mannheim & Turley Barracks | Heidelberg & Mannheim | West Germany | 7 | 1971 May? | 1971 Nov | By the Heidelberg Liberation Front. Supported by the American Servicemen's Union. "Power to the people, power to the imagination." | |
| FTA with Pride (Tri-Cities Edition) | Patton, Coleman, Mannheim & Turley Barracks | Heidelberg & Mannheim | West Germany | 8 | 1972 Jun? | 1973 May | By the Heidelberg Liberation Front. "Who will arrest war for disturbing the peace..." | |
| FTA, The | Local US Bases | Wiesbaden-Biebrich | West Germany | 3 | 1972 ? | 1972 Oct | "This paper is one of many ways to resist. You're either part of the solution or part of the problem." | |
| FTA: Fun, Travel and Adventure | Fort Knox | Fort Knox, KY | US | 33 | 1968 Jun | 1973 Apr | "Dedicated to Free Speech - You Write it, We Print it. Not another pro-Army paper about inspirational lifer shit. We're going to say what most of us say when talking to each other, but put it in print." | |
| G.I. News & Discussion Bulletin | All | Cambridge, MA | US | 15 | 1971 Jan | 1973 Jun | By United States Servicemen's Fund (USSF). Internal discussion bulletin for GI Coffeehouses and organizing projects. | |
| G.I. Office Newsletter | All | Washington, DC | US | 1 | 1970 Nov | 1970 Nov | The GI Office was "an ombudsman for active duty service men and women and veterans." The office "will help GIs and veterans directly and assist other GI organizations." | |
| G.I. Voice (NY) | Local Bases | New York, NY | US | 6 | 1969 Feb | 1969 Nov | Written by and for GIs "to provide a forum to discuss and question the Vietnam War, unionizing the Army and the nature of imperialism." GIs United and the Socialist Workers Party. | |
| G.I. Voice (WA) | Fort Lewis & McChord Air Force Base | Tacoma, WA | US | 3 | 1973 Oct | 1973 Dec | Successor to the Lewis-McChord Free Press by the GI Alliance. | |
| GAF | Barksdale Air Force Base | Bossier Parish, LA | US | 2 | 1969 Jul | 1969 Dec | "Let GAF apprise you of your rights and the rights of others. We will be bringing you continual insights into, and proofs of, the Immoral and destructive abuse of POWER in the heart of the FREE WORLD. Wake up, mindless proles and assert your constitutionally guaranteed prerogatives." | |
| Gargoyle | Camp Lejeune Marine Base | Jacksonville, NC | US | 2? | 1966 | 1966 Jun | By marines John Morgan and Steve Ryan printed on a hectograph in the barracks at Camp LeJeune. One issue was printed jointly with Kauri, which is the only known existing copy. | |
| Getting Late! | Local US Bases | Okinawa | Japan | 1 | 1971 Jun | 1971 Jun | Supported by Pacific Counseling Service. Poems, graphics and quotes. "Brothers and sisters! The man would have us believe we are alone. He wants us to believe that history stands behind him. He lies, oh my sisters and brothers, he lies through his teeth." | |
| Getting Together | Lowry Air Force Base | Aurora, CO | US | 7 | 1971 Sep | 1972 May | Edited by Second Lieutenant Robert Webb. The paper exists "to give the people at Lowry a voice that they do not now have and to provide information and opinions that are not provided by the other publication [the official base paper]." | |
| Gettin' the News | Local US Bases | Florence | Italy | 2 | 1976 | 1976 | For US soldiers in Italy. "We are opposed to the immoral and illegal war against the people of Vietnam, we are opposed to US military intervention in any other part of the world." | |
| GI Alliance | Local Bases | Washington, DC | US | 2 | 1970 ? | 1970 Jun | Newsletter of the GI Alliance, a coalition of GI groups seeking to build and promote the GI movement. | |
| GI Civil Liberties Defense Committee Newsletter | All | New York, NY | US | 2 | 1969 May | 1969 Jun | Became the GI Defender. | |
| GI Defender | All | New York, NY | US | 2+ | 1970 | 1970 | The newsletter of the GI Civil Liberties Defense Committee, which provided legal defense and support for the GI resistance and fought for GI freedom of speech. | |
| GI Movement in Yokosuka | Yokosuka Naval Base | Yokosuka | Japan | 1 | 1973 Jan | 1973 Jan | Mentioned in a 1976 Senate investigation which remarked, "Only issue noted. May be successor to Yokosuka David." | No known copies. |
| GI Organizer, The | Fort Hood | Killeen, TX | US | 5 | 1969 Apr | 1969 Aug | Published by GIs United and supported by the Socialist Workers Party. The first issue spoke to there being two GI newspapers at the base and expressed the wish there would not be "antagonistic feelings". They hoped the second paper would allow GI organizing to "broaden in scope." | |
| GI Press Service | All | New York, NY | US | 30 | 1969 Jun | 1971 Oct | By the Student Mobilization Committee to End the War in Vietnam to supply information and assistance to GIs newspapers. | |
| GI Says | Camp Eagle | Near the DMZ | Vietnam | 2 | 1969 | 1969 | Only Vol II known to exist. It reported a $10,000 reward for a hit on the commanding officer who led the disastrous battle at Hamburger Hill. | |
| GI's Fight Back | Fort Riley | Manhattan, KS | US | 3 | ? | ? | Put out by the Progressive Labor Party. "We don't want to fight this stinking war! We're tired of the Army's racism! We haven't any use for the lifers' harassment! We don't want to be used in any more riot control against our own people." | |
| Giessen Eagle, The | Giessen Depot & Other US Bases | Giessen | West Germany | 4 | 1970 Jun | 1970 Jun | "We can't stand the oppression of the US military. Not just what we face as soldiers but the oppression the US uses to try to control the people Vietnam, Korea, Latin America and the US." | |
| Gigline | Fort Bliss | El Paso, TX | US | 30 | 1969 Aug | 1972 | Voice of the Fort Bliss GI. Over 600 people attended the first meeting of GIs for Peace. In 1972 they said the paper had a circulation of about 3,000. | |
| GIPA News & Discussion Bulletin | All | San Diego, CA | US | 17? | 1973 | 1975 | By the GI Project Alliance. Also called GIPA News. Successor to SOS News. Carried GI project news from GI organizing on US bases all over the world. | |
| Graffitti, The | Patton, Coleman, Mannheim & Turley Barracks | Heidelberg & Mannheim | West Germany | 5 | 1969 ? | 1970 Jul | "Every soldier has, or should have, the right to think." American Servicemen's Union | |
| Grapes of Wrath | Norfolk Naval Station & Naval Air Station | Norfolk, VA | US | 31 | 1972 Nov | 1975 Jun | Started by the Jeffery G. Allison Defense Committee. Allison was a US Navy sailor charged with sabotage on the USS Forrestal. The paper soon was "fighting for the rights of enlisted people" in the Norfolk area. | |
| Great Lakes MDM Torpedo | Great Lakes Naval Training Center | Great Lakes, IL | US | 14 | 1970 Jan | 1971 Sep? | The newsletter supplement to Navy Times Are Changin' by the Movement for a Democratic Military. | |
| Green Machine | Fort Wainwright, Fort Greely & Eielson AFB | Fairbanks, Alaska | US | 8 | 1970 | 1970 Oct | The "official publication of the Fort Wainwright United Servicemen of Alaska." Sponsored by the American Servicemen's Union. | |
| Hair | Misawa Air Base | Misawa-shi | Japan | 8 | 1969 Jul | 1972 Mar | "Read Hair, It'll Grow on You." By the GIs at Misawa. | |
| Hansen Free Press | Local US Bases | Koza, Okinawa | Japan | 3 | 1972 Oct | 1973 Jul | Hansen means antiwar in Japanese. By GIs, the National Lawyers Guild and the Pacific Counseling Service. | |
| Harass the Brass | Chanute Air Force Base | Champaign, IL | US | 1 | 1969 | 1969 | Changed name after first issue to A Four-Year Bummer. "By keeping us ignorant, they hope to suppress our minds. We should not let this happen. Exercise your right to free speech." | |
| Head-On! Wish | Marine Corps Base Camp Lejeune & Air Station Cherry Point | Jacksonville, NC | US | 9 | 1968 ? | 1969 Aug | By the Servicemen's Peace and Freedom League. | |
| Helping Hand | Mountain Home Air Force Base | Mountain Home, ID | US | 26 | 1971 Jun | 1974 Oct | Published "for the enlisted women and men and officers stationed at the Mountain Home Air Force Base." The first issue said, it was "written, drawn, edited and published by 14 Airmen, 12 Sergeants, 2 Lieutenants, 2 Captains, and a couple of civilian supporters." It contained a poem called "Napalm Sticks to Kids" written by First Air Cavalry soldiers in Vietnam. The first verse went, "We shoot the sick, the young, the lame, We do our best to kill and maim, Because the kills all count the same, Napalm sticks to kids." | |
| Heresy II | Fort Leonard Wood | Ozarks, MO | US | 1 | 1969 | 1969 | Written, edited and distributed "by servicemen presently in the U.S. Army". Heresy II is "an affirmation that we can no longer allow ourselves to be silent." | |
| Highway 13 | Fort Meade Army Garrison | Fort Meade, MD | US | 21 | 1972 Jun | 1975 ? | Produced by GIs and veterans from the Baltimore Washington area with Vietnam Veterans Against the War and then the Military Law Project. "To fight for democratic rights for GIs and question the military-industrial complex." | |
| Hòa Bình! | Colorado Military Bases | Denver, CO | US | 12 | 1971 Aug | 1973 Jun | Hòa Bình means peace in Vietnamese. For veterans and GIs by Vietnam Veterans Against the War. | |
| Hogarm, The | Local Vets & GIs | Gainesville, FL | US | 1 | 1971 Jul | 1971 Jul | By the University of Florida Vets for Peace for vets and GIs. | |
| How Btry Times and Post Toastie Review News | Fort Lewis | Fort Lewis, WA | US | 5 | 1968 ? | 1968 Nov | Published "weakly once a week". Printed and distributed solely for the information and entertainment of How Btry 1/18. An irreverent spoof on Army news with events like the 1st International Buffer Olympics (with floor buffers). | |
| Huachuca Hard Times | Fort Huachuca | Sierra Vista, AZ | US | 2 | 1969 Apr | 1969 Jun | "Of the Troops, By the Troops, For the Troops." "The purpose of this paper is to provide the Ft. Huachuca GI – All Ft. Huachuca GIs that is – with a different and we believe, more accurate side of GI life here." | |
| Hunley Hemorrhoid | USS Hunley | San Francisco Bay Area | US | 3 | 1972 | 1972 | For "non-lifers" on the USS Hunley. "We serve to preserve the pain in your ass. FTN – Fuck the Navy." | |
| In Formation | Fort Knox | Fort Knox, KY | US | 2 | 1970 | 1971 | May be the only underground publication which applied for and received official Army permission to distribute on base. | No known copies. |
| In the Belly of the Monster | Marine Corps Air Station Iwakuni | Iwakuni | Japan | 2 | 1970 | 1970 | A newsletter by the staff of Semper Fi. Reported by Liberation News Service May 22, 1971. | No known copies. |
| Inside-Out | All | Chicago, IL | US | 19 | 1974 May | 1977 May | By Vietnam Veterans Against the War/Winter Soldier Organization for prisoners, especially vets and GIs. "Same struggle, same fight!" | |
| Internal Hemmorrhage | Exiles | Stockholm & Lindingo | Sweden | 3 | 1969 Mar | 1969 Apr | Published for U.S. war resisters in Sweden. "To support the Underground Railway of deserters and draft resisters." | |
| Jingo | Patton, Coleman, Mannheim & Turley Barracks | Heidelberg & Mannheim | West Germany | 2 | 1975 | 1975 | The paper "to bring back sanity to the Army." Supported by the American Servicemen't Union. | |
| Kauri | All | New York, NY | US | 17+ | 1964 | 1971 | A poetry newsletter with some issues "dedicated to those young men who are refusing the draft or who, already in service, are not taking part in American Aggression against other peoples, especially in Vietnam." Published material from GIs and deserters. | |
| Kill For Peace | Camp Drake | Tokyo | Japan | 2 | 1969 Nov | 1969 Dec | By Independent GIs with Beheiren (Japanese peace group). "We of Kill For Peace print the truth the way it is. Hell no, we shouldn't go!" | |
| Kitty Litter | USS Kitty Hawk | San Diego, CA | US | 7 | 1971 Nov | 1972 Aug | "What you don't miss by not reading the Flyer [ship's official paper]." By Concerned Military | |
| Korea Free Press | All | Wrightstown, NJ & Elmhurst, IL | US | 5 | 1970 | 1971 | "The soldier's free, democratic, guerilla, anti-fascist, revolutionary, peace and freedom loving liberation press. Free to GIs, 5 cents to CIA." | |
| Lamboy Times | Local US Bases | Hanau | West Germany | 5 | 1975 ? | 1975 Oct | By the Soldier's Committee of Hanau, "a group of concerned enlisted people and their families." Lamboy is a district of Hanau in Germany. | |
| Last Exit, The | Dolan Barracks | Schwäbisch Hall | West Germany | 2 | ? | ? | "In the Army the officers go out of their way to step on the NCOs, and in turn the NCOs go out of their way to screw the lower ranking EMs. How can the pigs possibly hope for unity and moral from troops when the show so much stupidity on their parts?" | |
| Last Harass | Fort Gordon | Augusta, GA | US | 13 | 1968 Oct | 1971 Sep | This paper is written and printed by Ft Gordon GIs. "If you don't know, learn. If you know, teach." Popular for its political cartoons. Started by Private Dennis L. Davis a member of the Progressive Labor Party | |
| Leavenworth Brothers Offense/Defense Committee Newsletter | Fort Leavenworth | Leavenworth, KS | US | 7 | 1974 Jan | 1974 Jul | By the Leavenworth Brothers Offense/Defense Committee in support of Leavenworth prisoners charged in a July 31, 1973 rebellion in the military prison. | |
| Left Face | Fort McClellan | Anniston, AL | US | 13 | 1969 Sep | 1971 Oct | Published by GIs and WACs at Ft. McClellan. "At long last Fort McClellan's oppressed GI's have an organ for dissent." Put out 2,000 copies per issue. | |
| Left Face (DC) | Local Bases | Washington, DC | US | 1 | 1969 Oct | 1969 Oct | "When law is tyranny, revolution is in order. Bring the war home." | |
| Left Flank, The | USMC Camps Hansen & Hague | Koza, Okinawa | Japan | 2 | 1971 | 1971 | GI free press in Okinawa. A "liberated newspaper" published by Marines from Camp Hansen and Camp Hague. | |
| Lewis-McChord Free Press | Fort Lewis & McChord Air Force Base | Tacoma, WA | US | 39 | 1970 Aug | 1973 Aug | Successor to the Fort Lewis Free Press. It was "...dedicated to peace, justice, and freedom to all, including those being held without their consent on active duty in the United States Armed Forces." It became the G.I. Voice, newspaper of the GI Alliance. | |
| Liberated Barracks | Local bases | Honolulu, Kailua, Hawaii | US | 20 | 1971 Sep | 1974 Sep | "They lie. We don't. Subscribe." The subscription cut-out form included a box to check for GIs indicating, "l am a captive of the US Armed Farces & want to receive The Liberated Barracks free." | |
| Liberated Castle, The | Fort Belvoir Army Base | Fairfax County, VA | US | 2 | 1971 Jun | 1971 July | The Castle was the official base paper. | |
| Liberation News Service | All | Washington, DC | US | Many | 1967 | 1981 | Provided an "alternative source" of news, cartoons and photographs to the underground press, including the GI press. Used extensively by much of the GI press. | |
| Liberty Call | Local Bases | San Diego, CA | US | 1 | 1973 May | 1973 May | By San Diego Concerned Military, a group of active-duty service personnel, veterans and civilians. | |
| Liberty Call (COM) | Local Bases | San Diego, CA | US | 4 | 1971 May | 1971 Sep | By San Diego Concerned Military, a group of active-duty service personnel, veterans and civilians. | |
| Lock 'n' Load | Local area | New York, NY | US | 1 | 1973 Aug | 1973 Aug | By Vietnam Veterans Against the War/Winter Soldier Organization for vets & GIs in the New York area. | |
| Lockbourne Skydove | Lockbourne Air Force Base | Columbus, OH | US | 4 | 1972 Apr | 1972 Sep | "SKYDOVE is published by the airmen and WAF of Lockbourne with a little help from their friends." | |
| Logistic, The | Fort Sheridan | Lake County, IL | US | 2 | 1968 Nov | 1968 Dec | The paper's slogan was, "Move minds, Supply Facts, Quarter Ideas". They explained, Logistics is the "branch of military science having to do with moving, supplying, and quartering troops.... Our ‘mental’ logistics will be characterized by facts and ideas. Instead of moving troops, we will move minds. Instead of supplying troops, we will supply the facts - about the army, about the country, about the world. Instead of quartering troops, we vow to make our paper a forum for your ideas and viewpoints." | |
| Longbitch | USS Longbeach | Long Beach, CA | US | ? | 1972 | 1972 | Reported in Camp News and RITA Notes. | No known copies. |
| Looper, The | Local Army Reserves & National Guard | San Francisco Bay Area | US | 5 | 1969 ? | 1969 Jul | By the G.I. Association, by and for Army reserve and National Guard enlisted men and officers. | |
| MacDill Freek Press | MacDill Air Force Base | Tampa, FL | US | ? | 1971 | 1972 | Referenced in Wachsberger. | No known copies. |
| Madison Veterans for Peace | Local area | Madison, WI | US | 49 | 1970 Apr | 1972 Aug | Dedicated "to the pursuit and preservation of peace and the general welfare of the whole world. Working for GI rights and changes in military policy." | |
| Man Can't Win If Ya Grin, The | Local US Bases | Okinawa | Japan | 1 | ? | ? | Referenced in Shiratori. | |
| Marine Blues | Local Marine Reserves | San Francisco Bay Area | US | 13 | 1969 Apr | 1970 May | By the G.I. Association, by and for San Francisco area Marine reserves. | |
| Military Intelligence | All | Los Angeles, CA | US | 3 | 1970 May | 1970 Sep | A press service and newspaper by the Military Research Group to provide the GI movement with information and intelligence on the military. | |
| Military Issues | All | New York, NY | US | 1 | 1969 Jul | 1969 Jul | By the War Resisters League for GIs, deserters and AWOLs. "Our GIs are no government issue." | |
| Minnesota Homefront Sniper | Local Bases | Minneapolis, MN | US | 1 | 1971 Aug | 1971 Aug | By Minnesota Vietnam Veterans Against the War and Veterans for Peace. | |
| Minnesota Veterans For Peace | Local Vets & GIs | Minneapolis, MN | US | 2 | 1970 ? | 1970 Jul | By Minnesota Veterans for Peace for vets and GIs. | |
| Mordor News | Norfolk Naval Station & Naval Air Station | Norfolk, VA | US | 2 | 1972 | 1972 | By the Revolutionary Affairs Office, by and for GIs. "Frodo and Bilbo Baggins, editors. FTN." | |
| Morning Report | Fort Devens | Groton, MA | US | 20 | 1970 May | 1972 Jul | Printed by and for Fort Devens GIs with the help of the Fort Devens United Front and the Common Sense Bookstore | |
| Mothball Blues | Philadelphia Naval Base | Philadelphia, PA | US | 1 | 1973 Nov | 1973 Nov | "Blues grew out of oppression." "We stand for world peace through understanding." | |
| My Knot | Minot Air Force Base | Minot, ND | US | 3 | 1971 | 1972 May | "Stop the Bombing! Power to the People!" "It's time we got our own country straight and stopped policing the world." | |
| Napalm | Fort Campbell | Hopkinsville, KY & Clarksville, TN | US | 6 | 1970 | 1970 | By some "dedicated servicemen" at Ft. Campbell. The first issue was called Napalmed. It was the second underground paper at the base. | |
| Navy Times Are Changin' | Great Lakes Naval Training Center | Great Lakes, IL | US | 16 | 1970 Feb | 1972 Sep | By the Movement for a Democratic Military. The paper started out with a statement on where they stood: "Okay, so here you are, like it or not you're part of a great military-industrial complex that grows on racism, fascism, and imperialism." It continued to describe military racism that tears "each other apart and not the system that has caused us to feel this way about our bothers." They also addressed "male supremacy" saying, "Men have consistently viewed women only as sexual objects — not as equal human beings." And spoke to how the military perpetuates these ideas. The paper "stands together with the people of the world who are fighting U.S. imperialism". They argued the US was "stealing natural resources, labor, and human lives to increase the profits of the rich in this country." "We take a firm stand against these policies we, as servicemen and women are in effect enforcing." | |
| New England Military News | New England Military Bases | Boston, MA | US | 1 | 1973 Feb | 1973 Feb | By GIs and veterans continuing earlier papers: 99th Bummer, Undertow, Morning Report, Free Fire Zone, All Hands Abandon Ship and Off the Brass. | |
| New Mobilizer | All | Washington, DC | US | 9 | 1969 Sep | 1970 Mar | Newsletter of the New Mobilization Committee to End the War in Vietnam. Organized large demonstrations in Washington, DC and San Francisco, including many vets and GIs. | |
| New Salute | Local bases | Baltimore, MD | US | 2 | 1969 Sep | 1969 Oct | By GIs United. "We seek to end that senseless slaughter and the oppression of Blacks, the poor, workers, students and GIs at home." | |
| New SOS News | All | San Francisco Bay Area | US | 4 | 1969 ? | 1969 Jul | By the United States Servicemen's Fund to support GI resistance and organizing. | |
| New Testament, The | Conn & Ledwood Barracks | Schweinfurt | West Germany | 4 | 1972 ? | 1972 Jul | GIs and dependents protest against the war in Vietnam and for GI rights. | |
| News | Local Bases | Southern California | US | 8 | 1972 Jul | 1972 Dec | By the Center for Servicemen's Rights. | |
| Newsletter For The GI Coffeehouses | All | Oakland, CA | US | 1+ | 1969 Dec | 1969 Dec | By the United States Servicemen's Fund and Support Our Soldiers to support GI Coffeehouses. | |
| News-Notes | Fort Meade Army Garrison | Fort Meade, MD | US | 3 | 1975 Jul | 1975 Nov | Military Law Project. Offering legal advice and counseling to GIs. Promoted a military union through the American Federation of Government Employees. | |
| Next Step, The | Local US Bases | West Germany | West Germany | 20 | 1970 Jul | 1971 Dec | A GI newspaper by GIs with civilian helpers. "It's time for an about face. We can all feel it – America is falling apart." | |
| Now Hear This! | Long Beach Naval Station & Naval Shipyard | Long Beach, CA | US | 1 | 1971 | 1971 | By the Movement for a Democratic Military and the Black Servicemen's Caucus. Renamed from Out Now and then renamed Out Now!. | |
| O.D.D. | Local bases | Honolulu, HI | US | 1 | 1969 | 1969 | It said it was "Hawaii's first GI underground newspaper." It was sponsored by the American Servicemen's Union | |
| Obligore, The | Local Marine Reserves | New York, NY | US | 7 | 1969 Sep | 1970 May | By Marine reservists. "Silent no longer. FTMC – Fuck the Marine Corps." | |
| Off the Brass | Portsmouth Naval Shipyard & Pease Air Force Base | Portsmouth, NH | US | 9 | 1971 | 1972 | "Published by and for service people, dependents, and friends of the Portsmouth area." Issue No. 4 asked why two Polaris-class subs were in the Yard being converted to Poseidon-class with more than "double the killing power for the brass to play with." | |
| Off The Bridge | Yokosuka Naval Base | Yokosuka | Japan | 6 | 1973 Apr | 1973 Sep | For GIs and veterans by Vietnam Veterans Against the War. | |
| Offul Times | Offutt Air Force Base | Sarpy County, NE | US | 6 | 1972 Apr | 1972 Oct | "We are an organization of active duty brothers and sisters who have joined hands in struggle to help make things better." | |
| Oinkenbury Raps | R.A.F. Alconbury (USAF) | Huntingdon | England | 2 | 1971 Aug | 1971 Aug | RAF Alconbury housed a US Air Force Base. "The official newspaper of RAF Oinkenbury. Stand up and be counted." This was an alternate name for Alconbury Raps. | |
| Okinawa Strikes | Local US Bases | Okinawa | Japan | ? | ? | ? | Referenced in US Senate 1976 hearings and Wachsberger. Supported by the Pacific Counseling Service and the National Lawyers Guild. | No known copies. |
| Olive Branch, The | Cecil Field Naval Air Station | Jacksonville, FL | US | 6 | 1970 Dec | 1972 May | The "naval free press" of Jacksonville, Florida. Dedicated "to the resistance, to the complete abolishment of all armed forces from the face of the earth." | |
| OM: The Servicemen's Newsletter | Pentagon | Washington, DC | US | 7 | 1969 Apr | 1970 | The first "antiwar, anti-brass" paper put out by a sailor in the US Navy. By Seaman Roger Priest, USN, who worked in the Office of Navy Information at the Pentagon. After a year of legal battles with the military, he received a bad conduct discharge. | |
| Omega Press | Local US Bases | Koza, Okinawa | Japan | 40 | 1972 Jan | 1975 Apr | By and for "servicemen, women, families and friends on Okinawa." On the cover page it proclaimed, "This paper is mine. You can't take it, but you can read it. Freedom thru resistance." | |
| On Korps | Camp Lejeune Marine Base | Havelock, NC | US | 1 | 1971 Mar | 1971 Mar | By the Concerned Military Committee. "We're going to have to find a new way to communicate. Things have got to change and we're going to tell it like it is." | |
| On the Beach | Naval Air Station Dam Neck | Dam Neck, VA | US | 7 | 1970 Sep | 1971 May | "Published in the spirit of the Declaration of Independence and the Constitution of the United States. It is a free press published by active duty GI's stationed at Dam Neck Virginia Beach, Virginia and is dedicated to establishing responsible alternatives to the current economic and military systems." | |
| Open Ranks | Fort Holabird & Bainbridge Naval Training Center | Baltimore, MD | US | 12 | 1969 | 1970 | By GIs United. A "newspaper in support of democracy." | |
| Open Sights | Fort Belvoir & other area bases | Fairfax County, VA | US | 19 | 1969 Feb | 1972 Jul | Written by GIs in the Washington area for GIs in the Washington area. The GIs with the paper also opened DMZ antiwar coffeehouse in 1971 to "build a movement towards a demilitarized world." | |
| Operation County Fair Newsletter | Local Vets | Bouge Chitto, AL | US | 5 | 1973 Nov | 1974 May | By Vietnam Veterans Against the War/Winter Soldier Organization. "Organizing free health care for local people. Medicine for the people." | |
| Oppressed, The | Walter Reed Army Medical Center | Washington, DC | US | 4 | 1971 Apr | 1971 Jun | By GIs United. According to the first issue, it "arose from the frustrations and anger toward the oppressive military system". It proclaimed that its key principles were "antiwar and anti-Army." | |
| Other Alternative, The | Exiles | Toronto | Canada | 1 | 1970 Apr | 1970 Apr | New name for Toronto Notes. Advice to draft dodgers and military deserters "before they leave the US." | |
| Other Half, The | Naval Air Station Glenview | Glenville, IL | US | 1 | 1972 Mar | 1972 Mar | We all know The Other Half "means our half. Every day we see more directives coming from on high. The time has come to express our views." | |
| Our Thing | Redstone Arsenal | Huntsville, AL | US | 1 | 1970 Jun | 1970 Jun | "Because you have silenced a man does not mean you have converted him." | |
| Out Now! | Long Beach Naval Station & Naval Shipyard | Long Beach, CA | US | 6 | 1971 | 1972 | By the Movement for a Democratic Military and the Black Servicemen's Caucus. | |
| P.E.A.C.E. | R.A.F. Bases | USAF Installations | England | 7 | 1970 Aug | 1971 Feb | People Emerging Against Corrupt Establishments (PEACE). By and for GIs "with the intent to foster a more humane military. Stop the war." | |
| Pacific Stars & Gripes | Local US Bases | Koza, Okinawa | Japan | 21 | 1976 Apr | 1976 Nov | By the People's Print Co-op, a group of Americans in and out of the military. "For a Bicentennial without colonies. For US GIs." | |
| Paper Bag, The | Fort Lee | Petersburg, VA | US | 3 | 1970 | 1970 | A free forum by and for GI's and the "draft weary." "If you hate the Army as much as we do, do something about it." | |
| Paper Grenade, The | Deserters | Stockholm | Sweden | 10+ | 1969? | 1971 Feb | Newsletter of the American Deserters Committee. | |
| Paper, The | Marine Corps Air Station Cherry Point | Morehead City, NC | US | 6 | 1971 Aug | 1972 May | The "official and/or unofficial people's publication" at MCAS Cherry Point. The primary function of the paper was to spread the information necessary to the "fight against racism, sexism and general discrimination primarily directed toward the lower pay grades." | |
| Pawn, The | Fort Detrick | Frederick, MD | US | 7 | 1969 Nov | 1970 Nov | By GIs United. The first issue declared its goals were to "Help unify and advance the GI rights movement, especially free speech, press and assembly." | |
| Pawn's Pawn, The | Fort Leonard Wood | Waynesville, MO | US | 1 | 1968 Jul | 1968 Jul | The editor was E1 Shad Burdette, Headquarters Company, 5th BCT Committee Group. "Uncle Sam uses you as pawns to do his dirty work. Consider this paper YOUR pawn!" | |
| Pay Back | Local Bases | Orange County, CA | US | 5 | 1970 Jul | 1972 | By the Movement for a Democratic Military. "Men and women of the military unite! You have nothing to lose but your dog chains." | |
| Peoples' Press, The | Fort Campbell | Hopkinsville, KY & Clarksville, TN | US | 8 | 1971 Mar | 1972 Jul | "The lifers and the brass are like roaches. They run when you turn the light on them." This was the third underground paper at the base. | |
| Pickle Press, The | Marine Corps Air Station El Toro | Irvine, CA | US | 1 | 1970 Jun | 1970 Jun | Supported by the Movement for a Democratic Military | |
| Pig Boat Blues | USS Chicago | San Diego, CA | US | 2 | 1974 | 1974 | Published for sailors on the USS Chicago with help from the Center for Servicemen's Rights. Mentioned in Up From The Bottom. | No known copies. |
| Pigleton Snout, The | Marine Corps Station Camp Pendleton | Oceanside, CA | US | 1 | 1970 Aug | 1970 Aug | Spoof of an official Marine newspaper by the Central Committee for Conscientious Objectors. | |
| Potemkin | Local Bases | New York, NY | US | 1 | 1970 Jan | 1970 Jan | Supported by the American Servicemen's Union. The only known issue was dedicated to Roger Priest, editor of OM at the Pentagon. | |
| Propergander | 440th Signal Battalion & other local Barracks | Heidelberg & Mannheim | West Germany | 5 | 1970 May | 1971 | Goals: "to promote peace, love and understanding, end the Vietnam War, regain full constitutional right for soldiers, end institutional racism, and more." | |
| Puget Sound Sound Off, The | Puget Sound Navy Yard | Bremerton, WA | US | 4 | 1971 Mar | 1971 Jun | Supported by the Concerned Officers Movement. "Published by active duty enlisted men and officers of the Puget Sound navy complex as a forum for dialogue and a vehicle for action promoting new categories of thought and action in the military." The editors were Navy Lt. Roger A. Mattison and Lt. Ronald L. VandenBossche. | |
| Rag, The | Reserves & National Guard | Chicago, IL | US | 4 | 1972 | 1973 | Reserve & National Guard Organizing Committee. A newsletter for and by reservists and National Guardspeople. "GIs are not riot cops." | |
| Rage | Camp Lejeune Marine Base & New River Air Station | Jacksonville, NC | US | 20 | 1971 Oct | 1975 Jan | By and for marines at Camp Lejeune and New River Air Station. The masthead had the word RAGE between two clenched fists underlined by "We Have Nothing to Lose But Our Chains". | |
| RAP! | Fort Benning | Columbus, GA | US | 12 | 1970 | 1971 | In issue #1 they reported on a bust of leafleters in the cafeteria on base and editorialized about the war. "Negotiate what? Withdraw now!... Let the Vietnamese people decide their own future and we'll solve our own problems here at home." By issue #6 their editorial started, "We the people of the United States of America charge the Government of the United States, the Military of the United States and Several Corporations with perpetrating and sustaining a Cruel, Inhuman, Wasteful, Imperialist war against the People of Vietnam." | |
| Raw Truth, The | Reserves & National Guard | Cambridge, MA | US | 4 | 1970 Oct | 1971 Jun | Reservists Against the War (RAW) are Guardsmen and Reservists who have decided "to do more than talk about their opposition to the war on Indochina." | |
| Rebel, The | Deserters & Resisters | Montreal | Canada | 3 | 1968 Mar | 1968 ? | An exile publication to link up deserter and draft resister activity in the U.S. and Canada. | |
| Reconnaissance | Forbes Air Force Base | Topeka, KS | US | 4 | 1972 | 1972 | A product of both "active duty and ex-GI's speaking with our brothers and sisters in the service." | |
| Redline | Reserves & National Guard | Berkeley, CA; Cambridge, MA; Boston, MA | US | 20 | 1970 | 1974 | Reservists Committee to Stop the War. To inform reservists and guardsmen "of their rights and what we can do to combat military racism, sexism and imperialism." | |
| Representative, The | Local US Bases | Koza, Okinawa | Japan | 1 | 1971 Dec? | 1971 Dec? | Creators unknown. "Free the Army Now!" | |
| Reservists Committee To Stop The War Newsletter | Reserves | Berkeley, CA | US | 3 | 1970 | 1970 | For the more than 500 officers and men who signed the statement "Reservists and National Guardsmen Say 'No' to the War". | |
| Resist | All | Cambridge, MA | US | 105 | 1967 Nov | 1976 Jun | A call to resist "illegitimate authority." Promoted all forms of resistance to the Vietnam War, including GI and veteran resistance. | |
| Resistance Notes | Local Bases | Honolulu, HI | US | 17 | 1969 | 1970 Mar | By the Hawaii Committee for Draft Resistance and Hawaii Resistance. "Eager and willing to encourage, aid, and abet individuals and groups within the military to resist and oppose the war and military injustice." | |
| Retaliation, The | Fort Lewis & McChord Air Force Base | Tacoma, WA | US | 1 | 1969 Aug? | 1969 Aug? | A servicemen's newspaper. Sponsored by the American Servicemen's Union & GIs United | |
| Reveille | Local Bases | Monterey, CA | US | 1 | 1968 Apr | 1968 Apr | By an Army vet and conscientious objector. Antiwar information for GIs at local military installations on the Monterey Peninsula. | |
| Right On | Camp Drake | Asaka-shi | Japan | 1 | 1970 Aug | 1970 Aug | "This Nefarious System, Oh! What I'd do to renew it. So I will paint its portrait, Exactly as I view it." | |
| Right-On Post | Fort Ord | San Francisco Bay Area | US | 4 | 1970 May | 1970 Aug | By the Movement for a Democratic Military. "We are angry. We don't like to be used to kill the beautiful revolutionaries in Indochina, the campuses, or the ghettos." The issues expanded from four to twelve pages before ceasing publication. | |
| Rise Up And Fight Back! | Norfolk Naval Station & Naval Air Station | Norfolk, VA | US | ? | 1974 | 1974 | By the Black Military Resistance League (formerly the Tidewater Africans). Black active-duty men and women. | No known copies. |
| Rising Up Angry | Local Bases | Chicago, IL | US | 50+ | 1969 Aug | 1975 | A radical youth movement newspaper which started covering GI resistance and printing letters from radical GIs in late 1970. | |
| RITA Notes | Local US Bases | Western Europe | NA | 800 | 1966 | 1975 | Resisters Inside the Army (RITA) internal newsletters and notes. Often reprints of US GI press and leaflets. | |
| Road, The | Local US Bases | West Germany | West Germany | 2 | 1971 May | 1971 ? | For GIs and students. Supported by the American Servicemen's Union. Previously called Dig It! | |
| Rough Draft | Norfolk Naval Station & Naval Air Station | Norfolk, VA | US | 7 | 1969 Feb | 1969 Oct | Tidewater servicemen's newspaper produced by servicemen in the Tidewater area representing all branches of the armed forces. One of its founders was ex-Petty Officer Dennis Ciesielski who had just completed a year in the brig for refusing in late 1967 to sail with the USS Dewey to Vietnam. | |
| Sacstrated | Fairchild Air Force Base | Spokane, WA | US | 6 | 1971 Jan | 1971 Aug | "...written, edited and published by military personnel at Fairchild Air Farce Base for military and civilian personnel at FAFB interested in working for peace and justice in the military." Supported by the American Servicemen's Union | |
| Scraggie Aggie Review | USS Agerholm | San Diego, CA | US | ? | 1974 | 1974 | By Seaman Recruit David Medina and "about six other USS Agerholm sailors" to protest unsafe conditions on the ship. | No known copies. |
| SDS New Left Notes | All | Chicago, IL | US | 71+ | 1968 Jan | 1969 Oct | The June 24, 1968 issue printed the SDS resolution advocating GI organizing. Subsequent issues increasingly continued GI resistance and antiwar news. The Jan 22, 1969 issue front-page article was called "Revolution in the Army" | |
| Seasick | Subic Bay Naval Station | Olangapo | Philippines | 5 | 1972 Jan | 1972 Aug | We propose as an alternative the formation and revamping of the present military into a MORE DEMOCRATIC MILITARY subject to the laws of our Country and the moral conscience of each member. | |
| Second Front Review, The | Deserters | Western Europe | NA | 6 | 1968 Jan | 1968 Dec | News and opinion by the American Deserters' Committee in Sweden and France. "We, by our acts of desertion, have dissociated ourselves from the US war of aggression in Vietnam." | |
| Second Front, The | Deserters | Stockholm | Sweden | 3 | 1968 May | 1969? | The official newspaper of the International Union of American Deserters and Draft Resisters. "Be a man, not a war machine – Desert." | |
| Second Front, The (Canada) | Deserters | Canada | Canada | 1 | 1968? | 1968? | The official newspaper of the International Union of American Deserters and Draft Resisters – Canadian Edition. "Uncle Pig, I Quit!" | |
| Seize the Time | Local US Bases | Iwakuni | Japan | ? | 1971 | 1971 | Referenced in US Senate 1976 hearings and Wachsberger. | No known copies. |
| Semper Fi | Marine Corps Air Station Iwakuni | Iwakuni | Japan | 178 | 1970 Jan | 1978 Aug | In addition to being antiwar, the paper demanded that the U.S. Iwakuni base "be given back to the Japanese people." 9 issues of the paper in 1970 were dated 1984 after George Orwell's novel. | |
| Separated From Life | R.A.F. Alconbury (USAF) | Huntingdon | England | 3 | 1974 Jan | 1974 Mar | Servicemen are Americans, "why can't we have the same constitutional rights that our brothers and sisters have?" | |
| Shakedown, The | Fort Dix | New Jersey | US | 23 | 1969 Mar | 1970 Sep | The paper's full title was The Time Has Come for a Long-Needed Shakedown. The first issue said, "This paper is our paper. It tells our story, not as the brass see it or wants it told, but as it is. It's written by GI's for GI's. What we have to say won't be found in the ARMY TIMES or the FORT DIX POST – the brass controls them and through them attempts to paint a bright picture of the Army. We know different. The time has come for a long needed SHAKEDOWN to expose the lies, half-truth, and untold occurrances [sic] that we find ourselves subjected to daily." | |
| Shitlifter, The | McChord Air Force Base | Tacoma, WA | US | 2 | 1972 Mar | 1972 Apr | The first issue announced, "This newsletter is an underground project which will be surfacing from time to time. This issue was published by airmen from 318th FIS, Dispensary Sq., and Supply Sq." | |
| Short Times, The | Fort Jackson & Shaw Air Force Base | Columbia, SC | US | 22 | 1968 Nov | 1972 Apr | One of the first GI underground papers. By GIs United by and for GIs at Shaw AFB and Fort Jackson. | |
| Shrapnel | Fort Ord | San Francisco Bay Area | US | 1 | 1970 Mar | 1970 Mar | By the Movement for a Democratic Military (MDM). Only one issue seems to have been published. In May 1970 MDM came out with another paper called Right-On Post. | |
| sNorton Bird | Norton Air Force Base | San Francisco Bay Area | US | 2 | 1970 Jun | 1970 Jul | With Norton GIs for Peace, we hope to establish an antiwar organization on the base. Most important, however, we seek to expose the true imperialist nature of the Indochina War." | |
| SOS Enterprises Ledger | USS Enterprise | San Francisco Bay Area | US | 1+ | 1972 | 1972 | A knock-off of the ship's official paper, the Enterprise Ledger called the SOS Enterprises Ledger. It looked exactly like the real paper except that it was filled with information about the bombing of the dikes and other Vietnam War news. Cited in the S.O.S. Newsletter and Up Against the Bulkhead. | No known copies. |
| SOS News (LA) | Local Bases | Los Angeles, CA | US | 13 | 1972 Jan | 1973 Feb | Support Our Soldiers support office newsletter for the GI movement to raise money, provide literature and films, recruit staff and maintain communications for GI coffeehouses and projects. It was affiliated with the United States Servicemen's Fund (USSF). | |
| SOS News (SF) | Local Bases | San Francisco Bay Area | US | 6 | 1971 | 1971 | Support Our Soldiers support office newsletter for the GI movement to raise money, provide literature and films, recruit staff and maintain communications for GI coffeehouses and projects. It was affiliated with the United States Servicemen's Fund (USSF). | |
| SOS Newsletter | Local Bases | San Francisco Bay Area | US | 13 | 1972 Jun | 1973 Jun | By the Stop Our Ship Support Committee, a group of men and women, GIs, vets and civilians who are strongly opposed to our government's involvement in Vietnam. | |
| Spaced Sentinel | Beale Air Force Base | Marysville, CA | US | 8 | 1970 | 1971 | "Since wars begin in the minds of men, it is in the minds of men that the defenses of peace must be constructed." | |
| Spartacus | Fort Lee | Petersburg, VA | US | 2 | 1969 | 1969 Aug | By soldiers at Fort Lee to "educate our brothers and sisters in uniform of the Constitutional rights to dissent, to be a rallying point for discussion and dissent, and to expose those in authority who misuse their powers." | |
| SPD News | Fort Dix | New Jersey | US | 16 | 1969 | 1970 Aug | Supported by the American Servicemen's Union. The Special Processing Detachment (semi-brig) was intended to isolate SPDers. "Thought by the brass as a way to fuck us over. This has proven untrue; we are now fucking over them." | |
| Special Weapon | Kirkland Air Force Base | Albuquerque, NM | US | ? | 1972 | 1972 | Referenced in Turning the Regs Around and Wachsberger. | No known copies. |
| Speek-Out | Local US Bases | Hanau | West Germany | 1 | 1969 | 1969 | Put out by GIs, dependents, and resistors inside the Army (RITA). "We are unwilling to kill or be killed in a war that makes others rich." | |
| Spirits Rebellious | Camp Lejeune Marine Base & New River Air Station | Newport, NC | US | 2 | 1974 | 1974 | Referenced in Rage and Semper Fi. | No known copies. |
| Spread Eagle, The | Fort Campbell | Clarksville, TN | US | 1 | 1969 | 1969 | One known issue. Quotes Ferlinghetti, "I am waiting for the American Eagle to really spread its wings and straighten up and fly right." | |
| Squadron Scandal | Local US Bases | Fulda | West Germany | 2 | 1976 ? | 1976 Nov | Voice of the Fulda Soldiers' Committee. "Working class of the Army unite! We of the Fulda Soldier's Committee want and need a union." | |
| Square Wheel | Fort Eustis | Lee Hall, VA | US | 10 | 1971 Nov | 1972 Apr | Most issues contained the paper's statement of purpose which stated: "This newspaper is an expression of the solidarity of all the GI's at Fort Eustis. Black and white brothers alike, the cause is the same." | |
| Star Bungled Begger | Local US Bases | Misawa | Japan | ? | ? | ? | Referenced in US Senate 1976 hearings. | No known copies. |
| Star Spangled Bummer | Wright-Patterson Air Force Base & Other local bases | Greene County, OH | US | 11 | 1970 | 1972 | Published by GIs United supported by the Socialist Workers Party. Their two basic demands were "an end to the war in Indochina and civil rights for GIs." | |
| Stars & Strikes | Local Bases | San Francisco Bay Area | US | 4 | 1975 Jan | 1976 Oct | By the Enlisted Peoples Organizing Committee and Pacific Counseling Service. | |
| Stars-N-Bars, The | Marine Corps Air Station Iwakuni | Iwakuni | Japan | 2 | 1970 | 1970 | Brig Newspaper "written by the Forgotten Few. We have received the following articles smuggled out of the Brig with requests to print them." | |
| Straight Sheet | Duluth Air Force Base | Duluth, MN | US | ? | ? | ? | Listed in Camp News as produced by the Concerned Military Movement. Referenced in Wachsberger. | No known copies. |
| Straight To The Point | Marine Corps Air Station Cherry Point | Morehead City, NC | US | 1 | 1970 Dec | 1970 Dec | "The servicemen's newspaper." Supported by the American Servicemen's Union, GIs United, and Vets for Peace. They supported "any groups or individuals attempting to change the plight of the service men and women." | |
| Strike Back | Fort Bragg | Fayetteville, NC | US | 2 | 1969 | 1970 | A weekly publication. "We are trying to establish a voice for you, the men and women on this farm." | |
| Stripes and Stars | R.A.F. Bases | USAF installations | England | 6 | 1973 Feb | 1973 Nov | "Unauthorized unofficial publication for American servicemen stationed in the United Kingdom." "Join the USAF; travel to exotic, distant lands; meet exciting, unusual people and kill them." | |
| Stuffed Puffin | Naval Air Station Keflavik | Keflavik | Iceland | 1 | 1970 Sep | 1970 Sep | "The US has made a drastic miscalculation in Vietnam." | |
| Summer Camp 69 | Twentynine Palms Marine Corps Base | Twentynine Palms, CA | US | 1 | 1969 | 1969 | By and for Marines. "All we can say is give peace a chance!" | |
| Sydney FTA | Local US Bases | Sydney | Australia | 1 | 1970 | 1970 | Directed at U.S. GIs. | |
| Tailfeather | Lackland Air Force Base | San Antonio, TX | US | ? | 1971 | 1971 | Cited in Your Military Left several times, and the paper's staff were reported at a peace march in Houston. | No known copies. |
| Task Force | Alameda Naval Air Station & the Treasure Island Naval Station | San Francisco Bay Area | US | 4 | 1968 Aug | 1969 Mar | Supported and covered the Oct 12, 1968 San Francisco March for Peace. "Some of the GIs involved worked on the military airlift and were able to get bundles into Vietnam." | |
| Calm Before The Storm, The | Long Beach Naval Station & Naval Shipyard | Long Beach, CA | US | 1 | ? | ? | By the Center for Servicemen's Rights. For and by the crew members onboard Navy ships in the Long Beach, CA area. | |
| Last Incursion, The | Fort Bragg | Fayetteville, NC | US | 2 | 1971 May | 1971 Jun | By Vietnam Veterans Against the War, both active duty, still in the "war machine", and ex-GIs. | |
| Other Side, The | Fort Bragg | Fayetteville, NC | US | 1 | 1970 Dec | 1970 Dec | By the Concerned Officers Movement. We oppose the Vietnam war. Published in the spirit of the First Amendment. | |
| Other Side, The | Local Bases | Newport, RI | US | 14+ | 1971 | 1972 Sep | By civilians and navy men and women in the Newport area and The Potemkin Collective. Expanded version of All Hands Abandon Ship. | |
| Squeak, The | Hillsdale County | Jonesville, MI | US | 32 | ? | 1970 | By the Hillsdale County Peace Fellowship. It ran interviews with antiwar veterans returning from Vietnam. | |
| Veteran, The | Vets & GIs | Chicago, IL | US | 106 | 1975 Oct | Active | By Vietnam Veterans Against the War for veterans and GIs fighting for vets benefits and rights. The only newspaper in this table still publishing. | |
| This is Life? | USS Gridley | San Diego, CA | US | 1 | 1972 Aug | 1972 Aug | Printed by Concerned Military for Sailors on the USS Gridley a Navy Destroyer. | |
| Tidewater Africans | Norfolk Naval Station & Naval Air Station | Norfolk, VA | US | 2 | 1973 | 1973 Oct | By the Tidewater Africans, Black women and Black men with the aid of Black GIs on the bases and ships around the area. "The voice of the Black GI. Express yourself." | |
| Top Secret | Fort Devens | Cambridge, MA | US | 5 | 1969 Feb | 1969 Nov? | Produced by the GI-Civilian Alliance for Peace (GI-CAP). "The first step is to exercise your right to dissent." | |
| Toronto American Deserters' Committee Newsletter | Deserters | Toronto | Canada | 2 | 1970 | 1970 | By the Toronto American Deserters' Committee. In 1969 the US Army desertion rate "climbed 300% over the previous year with 500 GIs deserting a day." | |
| Toronto Notes | Deserters | Toronto | Canada | 1 | 1970 Feb | 1970 Feb | Advice to draft dodgers and military deserters before they leave the U.S. | |
| Travisty | Travis Air Force Base | San Francisco Bay Area | US | 21 | 1971 | 1973 Nov | For and by GIs at Travis AFB. The first issue proclaimed, "Travis is the ‘Gateway to the Pacific’ through which Amerikan imperialistic oppression is channeled, and through which the dead and wounded return. The paper is bringing to you the truth about what's behind the war, oppression in the military and in civilian communities. The military is a death machine, and in this, the Travisty we hope to inject a spark of life, to aid in the liberation of ourselves and all our brothers and sisters THE WORLD OVER". | |
| Tricky Dix Law and Orders | Fort Dix and MacGuire Air Force Base | New Jersey | US | 2 | 1971 Jan | 1971 May | By the Military Law Project of the National Lawyers Guild. They opened a legal office and movement center to "provide legal assistance and a place to gather." | |
| Truth Instead | Local Bases | San Francisco Bay Area | US | 1 | 1969 Nov | 1969 Nov | "Everyone who is not brainwashed knows that the Army lies and the Stars and Stripes official Army paper even makes lousy ass wipe." "This paper is by servicemen for servicemen." | |
| Truth, The | Schloss-Kaserne Barracks | Butzbach | West Germany | 1 | 1973 Feb | 1973 Feb | Committee for GI Rights – group of GIs opposed to the Army's "illegal war on drugs." | |
| Tryin' Times | Local Bases | Milwaukee, WI | US | 3 | 1970 | 1970 | By the Milwaukee Area Draft Information Center. Started as a draft resistance counseling center, they were soon also "counseling GIs seeking to resist the military." | |
| Twin Cities Protester, The | 13th Artillery Group | Minneapolis, MN | US | 2 | 1970 Mar | 1970 Apr | Created by GIs United supported by the Socialist Workers Party. "Freedom of the press is guaranteed only to those who can run one." | |
| UCMJ : United Colorado Military for Justice | Local Bases | Aurora, CO | US | 1 | 1974 May | 1974 May | New name for The Blue Screw because they were including GIs from Fort Carson, Ent Air Force Base and Peterson Air Field. | |
| Ultimate Weapon, The | Fort Dix | New Jersey | US | 11 | 1968 Dec | 1970 Jan | Its full name was The Ultimate Weapon – of the Fort Dix Free Speech Movement. It was "published by the Fort Dix Free Speech Movement, an organization of GIs whose only connection with the Department of the Army is involuntary." | |
| Underground Oak, The | Oak Knoll Naval Hospital | San Francisco Bay Area | US | 1 | 1968 Dec | 1968 Dec | "We at Oak Knoll feel it imperative that other members of the armed forces and civilians become aware of dissent within the military." | |
| Undertow | Local Bases | Boston, MA | US | ? | 1972 | 1972 | Cited in Camp News, Navy Times Are Changin' and Up Against the Bulkhead | No known copies. |
| Underwood | Fort Leonard Wood | St. Lewis, MO | US | 3 | 1970 Mar | 1970 May | Produced by GIs for GIs. Distributed to GIs by mail. | |
| United Servicemen's Actions for Freedom | Wright-Patterson Air Force Base | Greene County, OH | US | 4 | 1969 Apr | 1969 Jul | The USAF newspaper "is a means for GIs to express their feelings about the military, conscription, the war, harassment, etc." | |
| Unity Now | Fort Ord | San Francisco Bay Area | US | 3 | 1970 Oct | 1970 Nov | Produced by GIs in the Special Processing Detachment (SPD), which was a confinement area on the base for soldiers under discipline or waiting for trial. | |
| Up Against the Bulkhead | Alameda Naval Air Station & the Treasure Island Naval Station | San Francisco Bay Area | US | 18 | 1970 | 1975 | "GI's Can Stop the War." By the Movement for a Democratic Military. Played a large role in the Stop Our Ship (SOS) movement | |
| Up Against the Wall | Local US Bases | West Berlin | West Germany | 7 | 1970 Feb | 1970 Sep | Published by Resisters Inside the Army (RITA) and supporters of RITA. The Army has denied the right to have our opinions heard. This paper provides that outlet." After the September 1970 issue, the paper's name was changed to Forward | |
| Up From the Bottom | Local Bases | San Diego, CA | US | 27 | 1971 Sep | 1977 Feb | By the Center for Servicemen's Rights; Concerned Military and Enlisted People's Rights Organization. By and for servicemen, women, veterans and dependents. | |
| Up Front | So. Calif Military Bases | Los Angeles, CA | US | 7 | 1969 May | 1969 Dec | By active duty GIs and reservists reporting on the GI antiwar movement, GI rights and GI happenings. | |
| Update – Southeast Asia | All | Chicago, IL | US | 2 | 1974 Jan | 1974 Feb | A news bulletin of Vietnam Veterans Against the War/Winter Soldier Organization about the war in Vietnam. | |
| Up-Tight | Fort Bliss | El Paso, TX | US | 1 | 1969 | 1969 | The only known issue stated, "Dare to think, dare to act." | |
| USAF | Wright-Patterson Air Force Base | Greene County, OH | US | 4 | 1969 Apr | 1969 Jul | By United Servicemen's Actions for Freedom (USAF). | |
| USS Coral Sea POD | USS Coral Sea | San Francisco Bay Area | US | 1 | 1971 Nov | 1971 Nov | Mock version of the official USS Coral Sea Plan of the Day. Showed all the officers on duty all day while the enlisted men had free time. The Command Duty Officers for the day were "LCDR Ass" and "CDR Hole". The officer in charge of the Afterbrow was "Captain Kangaroo". | |
| USS Duluth Free Press | USS Duluth | San Diego, CA | US | 3+ | 1974 | 1974 | By the Center for Servicemen's Rights by and for "the oppressed working enlisted on the Duluth." Originally called The Free Duluth. | |
| V.V.A.W. Killeen/Fort Hood Newsletter | Local Vets & GIs | Killeen, TX | US | 1 | 1972 | 1972 | A local newsletter of Vietnam Veterans Against the War. | |
| Venceremos | US Bases in Frankfurt | Frankfurt | West Germany | 1 | 1969 | 1969 | "The voice of the GI in Frankfurt. We demand the rights supposedly assured us by the US Constitution. When the pawns get together, the kings must fall." | |
| Vet Cong | All | Chicago, IL | US | 4 | 1972 | 1972 | By Vietnam Veterans Against the War during and after their protests against the 1972 Republican National Convention in Miami Beach, FL. "Vietnam, forgive us." | |
| Veteran, The | Local Vets & GIs | San Francisco Bay Area | US | 2 | 1972 Dec | 1973 | By the City College of San Francisco Veterans Organization. Fighting "against the war and for veterans." | |
| Veterans Peace Offensive | Local Vets & GIs | Detroit, MI | US | 7 | 1969 Dec | 1970 Apr | By GIs & Veterans Against the War in Vietnam. | |
| Veterans Stars & Stripes for Peace | Local Bases | Chicago, IL | US | 15 | 1967 Dec | 1971 Dec | By Veterans for Peace in Vietnam with vets and GI news about antiwar and resistance activity. | |
| Veterans Voice | Local Vets & GIs | Kansas City, MO | US | 9 | 1971 Jun | 1973 Feb | By Veterans For Peace and Vietnam Veterans Against the War. | |
| Vets For Peace | Local Vets & GIs | Berkeley, CA | US | 3+ | ? | 1971 Oct | By the Berkeley Vets for Peace. | |
| Vietnam GI | All | Chicago, IL | US | 20+ | 1968 Jan | 1970 Aug | One of the first GI underground papers. Very influential. By Vietnam veteran Jeff Sharlet. Press runs over 15,000 distributed to GIs by draft-resistance groups and mailed to around 3,000 GIs in Vietnam. | |
| Vietnam: A Message to G.I.'s & Diggers | US & Australian Bases | Sydney | Australia | 1 | 1968 | 1968 | Produced by the Vietnam Action Campaign for US and Australian GIs. Diggers is slang for Australian GIs. | |
| Voice of the Lumpen, The | European US Bases | Frankfurt/Main | West Germany | 13 | 1970 ? | 1972 Apr | Speaking to all US GIs in Europe. By supporters of the Black Panther Party Solidarity Committee. "We declare that our goal is to destroy the evils of US capitalism, imperialism and racism." | |
| VVAW Detroit Newsletter | Local Vets & GIs | Detroit, MI | US | 1 | 1972 | 1972 | A local newsletter of Vietnam Veterans Against the War. | |
| VVAW Newsletter | All | Chicago, IL | US | 42 | 1973 Feb | 1976 Jan | By Vietnam Veterans Against the War for vets and GIs. | |
| VVAW Providence Newsletter | Local Vets & GIs | Providence, RI | US | 5 | 1971 | 1971 | A local newsletter of Vietnam Veterans Against the War. | |
| VVAW/WSO GI News | All | Chicago, IL | US | 16 | 1973 Nov | 1975 Jul | By Vietnam Veterans Against the War/Winter Soldier Organization for GIs. | |
| VVAW/WSO New York/New Jersey Region Newsletter | Local Vets & GIs | New York, NY | US | 9 | 1973 Dec | 1975 Mar | A local newsletter of Vietnam Veterans Against the War. | |
| VVAW/WSO Regional Newsletter | Vets & GIs | Cincinnati, OH | US | 10 | 1973 Jun | 1974 Mar | Cincinnati regional newsletter for Vietnam Veterans Against the War/Winter Soldier Organization. | |
| VVAW-WSO East Bay Newsletter | Local Vets & GIs | Oakland, CA | US | 2 | 1975 Apr | 1975 Jul | A local newsletter of Vietnam Veterans Against the War. | |
| War Bulletin, The | Local Bases | San Francisco Bay Area | US | 22 | 1972 Apr | 1973 Feb | By the Bay Area April 22 Coalition and the Asia Information Group to spread news about the war and antiwar effort. Carried vets and GI resistance news and letters. | |
| We Are Everywhere | USS Coral Sea | San Francisco Bay Area | US | 3 | 1971 | 1972 | By sailors aboard the USS Coral Sea during the Stop Our Ship movement. | No known copies. |
| We Got The brASS | US Bases in West Germany | Frankfurt | West Germany | 4 | 1969 ? | 1970 ? | Put out by GIs, ex-GIs and resistors in Europe, "united by our opposition to the mindless war in Vietnam. We unite with the GIs in the US who have begun to say FTA." | |
| We Got The brASS (Asian Edition) | US Bases in Asia | Tokyo | Japan | 4 | 1969 | 1970 | Journal of the Second Front International Asian Edition, put out by GIs, deserters and resisters. | |
| We Got The brASS (Okinawa Edition) | Local US Bases | Okinawa | Japan | 1 | 1970 | 1970 | For GIs to tell each other "how to survive under THE MAN's laws." | |
| We Got The brASS (Vietnam Edition) | US Bases in Vietnam | Tokyo | Japan | 1 | 1970 | 1970 | "Brothers in Nam requested a relevant paper." Contained material from the States; "reports from Nam brothers in transit, in hospitals or on leave; and correspondence from Nam." | |
| Whack! | Fort McClellan | Anniston, AL | US | 1? | 1971 Apr | 1971? | Women's Army Corps (WAC) newsletter. By WACs and civilian women organizing at Fort McClellan. Cited in "Beyond Combat" and an announcement of the first issue was in the G.I. News & Discussion Bulletin. | No known copies. |
| Where Are We | Fort Huachuca & Davis-Monthan AFB | Sierra Vista, AZ | US | 7 | 1971 May | 1972 Mar | A "newspaper by and for GI's of Ft. Huachuca, written to present our main themes," which were, the Vietnam War is "morally wrong", GIs should have "full Constitutional rights", "stop racism", and the Army should be "converted into a positive force for society". | |
| Where it's At | US Bases in West Germany | West Berlin | West Germany | 8 | 1968 | 1969 | A newspaper of "common sense and survival for GIs." Put out by Students for a Democratic Society in West Berlin. | |
| Whig, The | Clark Air Base | Luzon Island | Philippines | 6 | 1970 Jul | 1971 Nov | The paper's masthead complained, "The unwilling, led by the unqualified, doing the unnecessary, for the unconcerned." Their second issue created quite a stir, resulting in a Philippian Justice Department probe of U.S. military police on Clark Air Base. The paper said an "exclusively white" squad of 50 to 80 men abused Filipino and American workers on the base. | |
| Why | Local US Bases | Naha, Okinawa | Japan | 1 | ? | ? | Poems and legal advice for GIs. | |
| Wildcat | Local Bases | Baltimore, MD & Evanston, IL | US | 12 | 1973 Oct | 1975 | Put out by the Military Action Committee for working people and GIs. "If the Army wanted you to have a wife, they'd issue you one." | |
| Wiley Word, The | Wiley Barracks | New Ulm | West Germany | 4 | 1972 Sep | 1972 Dec | A newspaper for GIs, civilians and their German friends. In English and German. | |
| Winter Soldier | US Bases and Veterans | Chicago, IL | US | 27 | 1973 ? | 1975 Jul | By Vietnam Veterans Against the War/Winter Soldier Organization for veterans and GIs. | |
| Witness, The | Hardt Kaserne Army Base | Schwäbisch Gmünd | West Germany | 7 | ? | 1970 Apr | Local GI newspaper. "To err is Army." | |
| Women Hold Up Half The Sky | Yokosuka Naval Base | Yokosuka | Japan | 3 | 1974 | 1974 May | By women in and out of the military for military women and dependents. "We are fighting against the ways we are oppressed using the ways we are strong." | |
| Women's Voice | Norfolk Naval Station & Naval Air Station | Norfolk, VA | US | 1 | 1975 Apr | 1975 Apr | By the women of the Defense Committee/Tidewater. "We feel that as women of all races we have special hassles, and as women associated with the military; either by being in the military, married to someone in the military, or living in military towns, these hassles are intensified." | |
| Women's Voices | Local US Bases | Koza, Okinawa | Japan | 2 | 1974 | 1974 | By and for women on Okinawa, both servicewomen and civilians. Supported by the Women's House, "a place where women can get together and talk about children, our husbands, health care and our lives." | |
| Wood-Pecker | Fort Leonard Wood | Waynesville, MO | US | 2 | 1972 May | 1972 Jul | The first issue: "...this is your newspaper, for your use and abuse, to read and heed, to write for, fight for, burn, wrap packages or just do anything you want with it!! ‘know what I mean?’" | |
| Word, The | Local US Bases | Ulm/Donau | West Germany | 2 | 1972 ? | 1972 | Written by "concerned Americans in the Army and civilians for GIs". Supported by RITA - Resisters Inside the Army. | |
| Worm's Eye View | NKP Air Force Base | Nakhon Phanom Province | Thailand | 1 | 1972 | 1972 | Worm's Eye View (of Nixon's War) by the "underground non-organization" at NKP (US Air Force Base in Thailand)Nakhon Phanom Royal Thai Navy Base. "We Openly Resist Military Stupidity (WORMS)." | |
| WRIS Supplement | Resisters | Stockholm | Sweden | 3 | 1972 Feb | 1972 May | Newsletter for American war resisters in Sweden. | |
| Write On | Local US Bases | Bitburg/Eifel | West Germany | 2 | 1973 Sep | 1973 Oct | An "unauthorized, unofficial" GI paper by Counsel About Rights and Equality. Supported by the American Servicemen's Union. | |
| Xpress | Fort Hamilton | Brooklyn, NY | US | 6 | 1970 Sep | 1971 Apr | Created by the Fort Hamilton GI's United Against the War in Vietnam to oppose the war in Southeast Asia and provide a forum for GIs of the Ft. Hamilton Complex to "have a voice." | |
| Yah-Hoh | Fort Lewis | Tacoma, WA | US | 1 | 1970 | 1970 | The only known paper by and for Native American servicemen and women. Yah-Hoh means "Lets Get It Together". By Hew-Kecaw-Na-Yo (To Resist). Their logo was FTA with an arrow through it. | |
| YAND | Local US Bases | Fukuoka | Japan | 1 | 1970 Oct | 1970 Oct | By GIs – Young Americans For A New Direction (YAND). Written and edited by active duty GIs stationed in the Hakata, Itazuke, Sasebo area. | |
| Yankee Refugee! | Deserters & Resisters | Vancouver | Canada | 8 | 1968 Nov | 1969 Jul | For the exchange of information among US military deserters and draft resisters in Canada. By Americans for Americans. Our country is the world, our countrymen are all mankind. | |
| Yokosuka David | Yokosuka Naval Base | Yokosuka | Japan | 6 | 1970 ? | 1970 Dec | By Yokosuka GIs with Pacific Counseling Service and the GI Movement in Yokosuka. "Right on, write on." | |
| Your Military Left | Fort Sam Houston | San Antonio, TX | US | 28 | 1969 Jul | 1973 | The first issue said it was "an independent paper put out by officers and enlisted men of Fort Sam Houston." It was "dedicated to peace and brotherhood." Some issues listed the paper's staff by rank on the masthead. | |
| Your Military Left Newsletter | Fort Sam Houston | San Antonio, TX | US | 5 | 1969 Nov | 1971 Aug | The first issue announced a new weekly newsletter in addition to the monthly Your Military Left. It ended up coming out sporadically. It included quotes from Captain Irv Roger, MD, a paper staff member who had been sent to Vietnam. "I am protesting now because I – like countless other Americans feel that the continuation of current Vietnam policies is immoral." "I myself have found out what the army thinks of anyone who rocks the army boat, but that damn boat needs rocking." | |
| Zero | Exiles | Reille-Soult | France | 6 | 1973 Jun | 1976 Nov | Zero, the Paris American Exile Rock-Bottom Newsletter for deserters, draft resisters and AWOLs. | |

== See also ==
- A Matter of Conscience
- Concerned Officers Movement
- FTA Show - 1971 anti-Vietnam War road show for GIs
- F.T.A. - documentary film about the FTA Show
- Fort Hood Three
- GI's Against Fascism
- GI Coffeehouses
- Intrepid Four
- Movement for a Democratic Military
- Opposition to United States involvement in the Vietnam War
- Sir! No Sir!, a documentary about the antiwar movement within the ranks of the United States Armed Forces
- The Spitting Image, a 1998 book by Vietnam veteran and sociology professor Jerry Lembcke which disproves the widely believed narrative that American soldiers were spat upon and insulted by antiwar protesters
- Stop Our Ship (SOS)
- United States Servicemen's Fund
- Veterans For Peace
- Vietnam Veterans Against the War
- Waging Peace in Vietnam
- Winter Soldier Investigation
