= 1980 United States presidential election in Michigan =

- November 4, 1980

All 21 Michigan votes to the Electoral College
- Turnout: 61.1% ▲

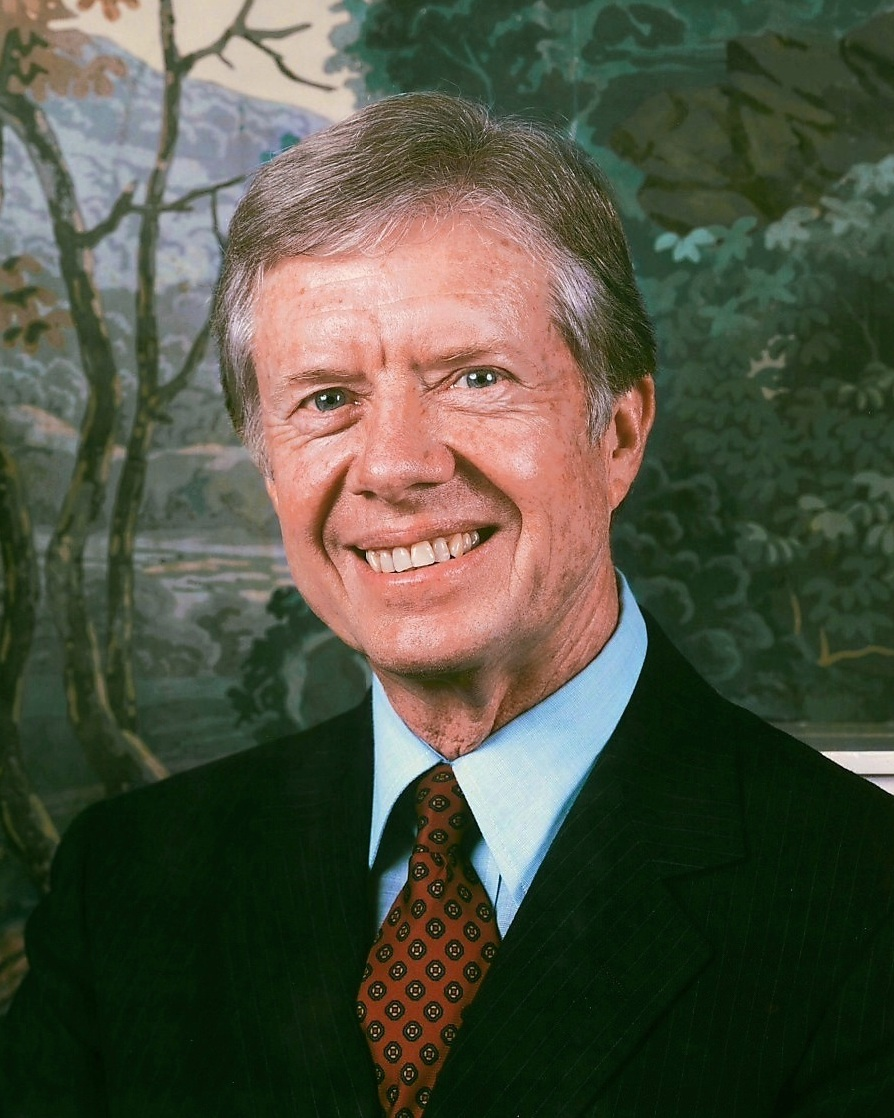

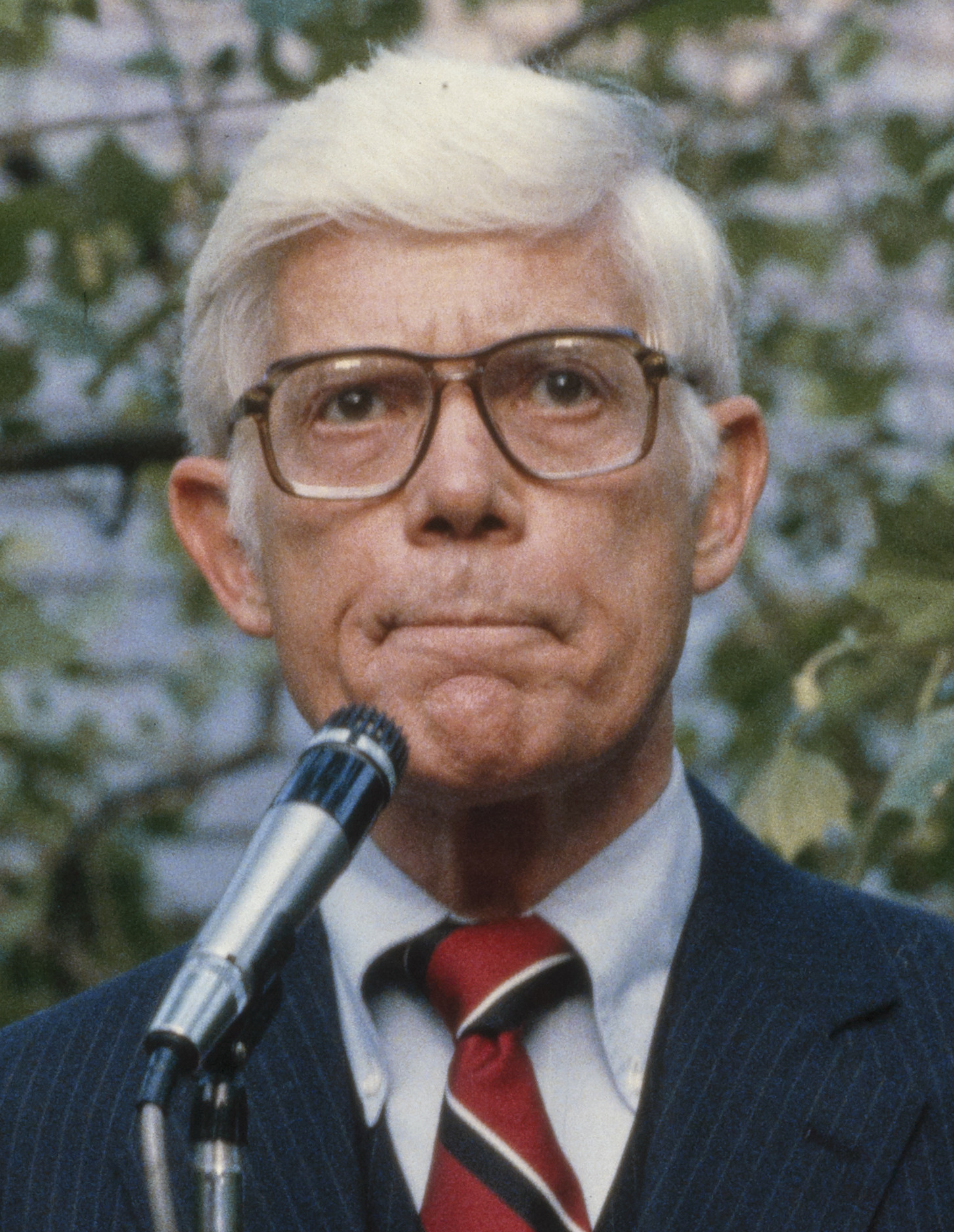
Nominee	Ronald Reagan	Jimmy Carter	John B. Anderson
Party	Republican	Democratic	Anderson Coalition (Note: Anderson’s party was listed on this state’s ballot as “Anderson Coalition”.)
Home state	California	Georgia	Illinois
Running mate	George H. W. Bush	Walter Mondale	Patrick Lucey
Electoral vote	21	0	0
Popular vote	1,915,225	1,661,532	275,223
Percentage	48.99%	42.50%	7.04%
County results
Reagan
40–50%
50–60%
60–70%
Carter
40–50%
50–60%
President before election
Jimmy Carter
Democratic
Elected President
Ronald Reagan
Republican

The 1980 United States presidential election in Michigan took place on November 4, 1980. All fifty states and the District of Columbia participated in the 1980 United States presidential election. Voters chose 21 electors to the Electoral College, who voted for president and vice president.

Michigan was won by former California governor Ronald Reagan (R) by 6.5%. This result nonetheless made Michigan 3.2% more Democratic than the nation at large. This is despite the fact that it voted to the right of the nation by over seven points in 1976, when favorite son Gerald Ford won Michigan.

Along with Maine, New York, Mississippi, and Vermont, Michigan was one of the few states in which President Carter won counties that had gone to Ford in the previous presidential election, as Carter flipped both Washtenaw and Marquette.

== Primary election ==
Michigan held presidential primary elections on May 20, 1980.

=== Democratic party ===
Turnout for the Democratic primary was exceptionally low as the party had already awarded its delegates in party caucuses on April 26th and the primary results were non-binding. Neither Carter nor Kennedy appeared on the primary ballot.

==== Results ====
Democratic primary results
Party	Candidate	Votes	%
Democratic	Jerry Brown	23,043	29.38%
Democratic	Lyndon LaRouche	8,948	11.41%
Democratic	Uncommitted	36,385	46.40%
Democratic	Scattering	10,048	12.81%
Total votes		78,424	100.00%

=== Republican party ===
Unlike the Democratic primary, the Republican primary did award delegates and thus saw significantly higher turnout.

==== Results ====
Republican primary results
Party	Candidate	Votes	%
Republican	George H. W. Bush	341,998	57.46%
Republican	Ronald Reagan	189,184	31.79%
Republican	John B. Anderson	48,947	8.22%
Republican	Ben Fernandez	2,248	8.22%
Republican	Harold Stassen	1,938	8.22%
Republican	Uncommitted	10,265	1.72%
Republican	Scattering	596	0.10%
Total votes		595,176	100.00%

== General election ==
=== Results ===
1980 United States presidential election in Michigan
Party	Candidate	Votes	%
Republican	Ronald Reagan	1,915,225	48.99%
Democratic	Jimmy Carter (inc.)	1,661,532	42.50%
Anderson Coalition	John B. Anderson	275,223	7.04%
Libertarian	Ed Clark	41,597	1.06%
Citizens	Barry Commoner	11,930	0.31%
Communist	Gus Hall	3,262	0.08%
Workers World	Deirdre Griswold (write-in)	30	0.00%
American Independent	Percy L. Greaves Jr. (write-in)	21	0.00%
Prohibition	Benjamin C. Bubar (write-in)	9	0.00%
American Independent	John Rarick (write-in)	5	0.00%
Write-ins	Scattering	891	0.02%
Total votes		3,909,725	100.00%

==== Results by county ====
County	Ronald Reagan Republican		Jimmy Carter Democratic		John B. Anderson Anderson Coalition		All Others Various		Margin		Total votes cast
County	#	%	#	%	#	%	#	%	#	%	Total votes cast
Alcona	2,905	57.39%	1,857	36.69%	247	4.88%	53	1.05%	1,048	20.70%	5,062
Alger	2,059	44.31%	2,242	48.25%	263	5.66%	83	1.79%	-183	-3.94%	4,647
Allegan	20,560	62.24%	9,877	29.90%	1,984	6.01%	610	1.85%	10,683	32.34%	33,031
Alpena	6,901	49.89%	5,834	42.18%	913	6.60%	184	1.33%	1,067	7.71%	13,832
Antrim	4,706	56.26%	2,909	34.78%	602	7.20%	147	1.76%	1,797	21.48%	8,364
Arenac	3,436	53.43%	2,547	39.61%	333	5.18%	115	1.79%	889	13.82%	6,431
Baraga	2,046	52.18%	1,609	41.04%	201	5.13%	65	1.66%	437	11.14%	3,921
Barry	12,006	58.13%	6,857	33.20%	1,399	6.77%	392	1.90%	5,149	24.93%	20,654
Bay	25,331	46.40%	24,517	44.91%	3,886	7.12%	858	1.57%	814	1.49%	54,592
Benzie	3,054	55.55%	1,842	33.50%	455	8.28%	147	2.67%	1,212	22.05%	5,498
Berrien	41,458	60.99%	22,152	32.59%	3,422	5.03%	946	1.39%	19,306	28.40%	67,978
Branch	10,224	62.99%	4,635	28.56%	1,102	6.79%	269	1.66%	5,589	34.43%	16,230
Calhoun	30,912	52.24%	23,022	38.90%	4,468	7.55%	774	1.31%	7,890	13.34%	59,176
Cass	11,206	56.78%	7,058	35.76%	1,156	5.86%	315	1.60%	4,148	21.02%	19,735
Charlevoix	5,053	51.58%	3,741	38.19%	816	8.33%	186	1.90%	1,312	13.39%	9,796
Cheboygan	5,221	52.45%	3,938	39.56%	638	6.41%	157	1.58%	1,283	12.89%	9,954
Chippewa	7,059	52.31%	5,268	39.04%	951	7.05%	216	1.60%	1,791	13.27%	13,494
Clare	5,719	53.36%	4,164	38.85%	663	6.19%	172	1.60%	1,555	14.51%	10,718
Clinton	14,968	60.62%	7,539	30.53%	1,736	7.03%	448	1.81%	7,429	30.09%	24,691
Crawford	2,652	53.42%	1,826	36.78%	390	7.86%	96	1.93%	826	16.64%	4,964
Delta	8,146	46.04%	8,475	47.90%	849	4.80%	222	1.25%	-329	-1.86%	17,692
Dickinson	6,614	50.58%	5,694	43.54%	596	4.56%	173	1.32%	920	7.04%	13,077
Eaton	22,927	57.35%	12,742	31.87%	3,533	8.84%	775	1.94%	10,185	25.48%	39,977
Emmet	5,930	53.88%	3,724	33.84%	1,134	10.30%	218	1.98%	2,206	20.04%	11,006
Genesee	78,572	42.73%	90,393	49.15%	12,274	6.67%	2,661	1.45%	-11,821	-6.42%	183,900
Gladwin	4,509	51.09%	3,733	42.30%	463	5.25%	120	1.36%	776	8.79%	8,825
Gogebic	4,388	42.80%	5,254	51.25%	493	4.81%	117	1.14%	-866	-8.45%	10,252
Grand Traverse	14,484	58.63%	7,150	28.94%	2,568	10.39%	504	2.04%	7,334	29.69%	24,706
Gratiot	9,294	59.30%	4,916	31.37%	1,193	7.61%	269	1.72%	4,378	27.93%	15,672
Hillsdale	10,951	66.37%	4,375	26.52%	882	5.35%	291	1.76%	6,576	39.85%	16,499
Houghton	7,926	47.94%	6,858	41.48%	1,423	8.61%	327	1.98%	1,068	6.46%	16,534
Huron	10,553	65.27%	4,434	27.43%	976	6.04%	204	1.26%	6,119	37.84%	16,167
Ingham	56,777	45.19%	48,278	38.43%	17,139	13.64%	3,437	2.74%	8,499	6.76%	125,631
Ionia	12,040	57.38%	7,039	33.55%	1,539	7.33%	364	1.73%	5,001	23.83%	20,982
Iosco	6,680	56.54%	4,255	36.01%	739	6.25%	141	1.19%	2,425	20.53%	11,815
Iron	3,507	45.36%	3,742	48.40%	371	4.80%	112	1.45%	-235	-3.04%	7,732
Isabella	10,407	50.24%	7,293	35.21%	2,511	12.12%	504	2.43%	3,114	15.03%	20,715
Jackson	33,749	53.93%	23,685	37.85%	4,165	6.66%	981	1.57%	10,064	16.08%	62,580
Kalamazoo	48,669	50.90%	34,528	36.11%	10,833	11.33%	1,587	1.66%	14,141	14.79%	95,617
Kalkaska	2,802	56.42%	1,807	36.39%	260	5.24%	97	1.95%	995	20.03%	4,966
Kent	112,604	54.59%	72,790	35.29%	17,913	8.68%	2,983	1.45%	39,814	19.30%	206,290
Keweenaw	583	46.27%	570	45.24%	87	6.90%	20	1.59%	13	1.03%	1,260
Lake	1,730	43.22%	2,041	50.99%	187	4.67%	45	1.12%	-311	-7.77%	4,003
Lapeer	15,996	56.99%	9,671	34.45%	1,868	6.66%	534	1.90%	6,325	22.54%	28,069
Leelanau	4,585	57.78%	2,348	29.59%	839	10.57%	163	2.05%	2,237	28.19%	7,935
Lenawee	20,366	56.44%	12,935	35.85%	2,230	6.18%	554	1.54%	7,431	20.59%	36,085
Livingston	25,012	60.17%	12,626	30.37%	3,247	7.81%	685	1.65%	12,386	29.80%	41,570
Luce	1,659	57.56%	992	34.42%	177	6.14%	54	1.87%	667	23.14%	2,882
Mackinac	3,021	52.23%	2,262	39.11%	415	7.17%	86	1.49%	759	13.12%	5,784
Macomb	154,155	51.88%	120,125	40.43%	18,975	6.39%	3,864	1.30%	34,030	11.45%	297,119
Manistee	5,662	52.91%	4,164	38.91%	699	6.53%	177	1.65%	1,498	14.00%	10,702
Marquette	13,181	44.71%	13,312	45.16%	2,481	8.42%	505	1.71%	-131	-0.45%	29,479
Mason	7,137	58.14%	4,134	33.68%	825	6.72%	180	1.47%	3,003	24.46%	12,276
Mecosta	7,754	53.37%	5,228	35.99%	1,322	9.10%	224	1.54%	2,526	17.38%	14,528
Menominee	6,170	52.52%	4,962	42.23%	452	3.85%	165	1.40%	1,208	10.29%	11,749
Midland	17,828	53.04%	12,019	35.76%	3,152	9.38%	611	1.82%	5,809	17.28%	33,610
Missaukee	3,221	63.47%	1,563	30.80%	230	4.53%	61	1.20%	1,658	32.67%	5,075
Monroe	25,612	51.26%	20,578	41.19%	3,111	6.23%	663	1.33%	5,034	10.07%	49,964
Montcalm	10,822	56.51%	6,706	35.02%	1,309	6.84%	313	1.63%	4,116	21.49%	19,150
Montmorency	2,400	55.71%	1,654	38.39%	195	4.53%	59	1.37%	746	17.32%	4,308
Muskegon	36,512	53.73%	26,645	39.21%	4,094	6.02%	703	1.03%	9,867	14.52%	67,954
Newaygo	8,918	58.58%	5,236	34.40%	850	5.58%	219	1.44%	3,682	24.18%	15,223
Oakland	253,211	54.65%	164,869	35.58%	38,273	8.26%	6,975	1.51%	88,342	19.07%	463,328
Oceana	5,465	57.14%	3,386	35.40%	570	5.96%	143	1.50%	2,079	21.74%	9,564
Ogemaw	4,169	51.29%	3,426	42.15%	425	5.23%	108	1.33%	743	9.14%	8,128
Ontonagon	2,569	48.95%	2,375	45.26%	237	4.52%	67	1.28%	194	3.69%	5,248
Osceola	4,902	60.04%	2,650	32.46%	466	5.71%	146	1.79%	2,252	27.58%	8,164
Oscoda	1,915	55.25%	1,325	38.23%	183	5.28%	143	1.24%	590	17.02%	3,466
Otsego	3,771	53.70%	2,666	37.96%	493	7.02%	93	1.32%	1,105	15.74%	7,023
Ottawa	51,217	67.85%	18,435	24.42%	4,903	6.50%	929	1.23%	32,782	43.43%	75,484
Presque Isle	3,486	50.43%	2,952	42.71%	382	5.53%	92	1.33%	534	7.72%	6,912
Roscommon	5,280	54.66%	3,763	38.96%	508	5.26%	108	1.12%	1,517	15.70%	9,659
Saginaw	45,233	48.22%	41,650	44.40%	5,677	6.05%	1,239	1.32%	3,583	3.82%	93,799
Sanilac	12,158	67.11%	4,898	27.04%	863	4.76%	198	1.09%	7,260	40.07%	18,117
Schoolcraft	2,097	47.94%	1,964	44.90%	243	5.56%	70	1.60%	133	3.04%	4,374
Shiawassee	15,756	51.71%	11,985	39.33%	2,121	6.96%	608	2.00%	3,771	12.38%	30,470
St. Clair	31,021	55.61%	20,410	36.59%	3,592	6.44%	756	1.36%	10,611	19.02%	55,779
St. Joseph	13,631	63.19%	6,318	29.29%	1,283	5.95%	338	1.57%	7,313	33.90%	21,570
Tuscola	13,306	59.12%	7,632	33.91%	1,266	5.63%	301	1.34%	5,674	25.21%	22,505
Van Buren	14,451	55.96%	9,248	35.81%	1,691	6.55%	434	1.68%	5,203	20.15%	25,824
Washtenaw	48,699	41.92%	51,013	43.91%	13,463	11.59%	3,004	2.59%	-2,314	-1.99%	116,179
Wayne	315,532	35.42%	522,024	58.60%	43,608	4.90%	9,680	1.09%	-206,492	-23.18%	890,844
Wexford	6,027	54.01%	4,173	37.39%	752	6.74%	208	1.86%	1,854	16.62%	11,160
Totals	1,915,225	48.99%	1,661,532	42.50%	275,223	7.04%	57,745	1.48%	253,693	6.49%	3,909,725

===== Counties that flipped from Democratic to Republican =====
- Arenac
- Bay
- Dickinson
- Keweenaw
- Monroe
- Ogemaw
- Ontonagon
- Schoolcraft

===== Counties that flipped from Republican to Democratic =====
- Marquette
- Washtenaw

== See also ==
- United States presidential elections in Michigan
