= 1980 United States presidential election in New York =

- November 4, 1980

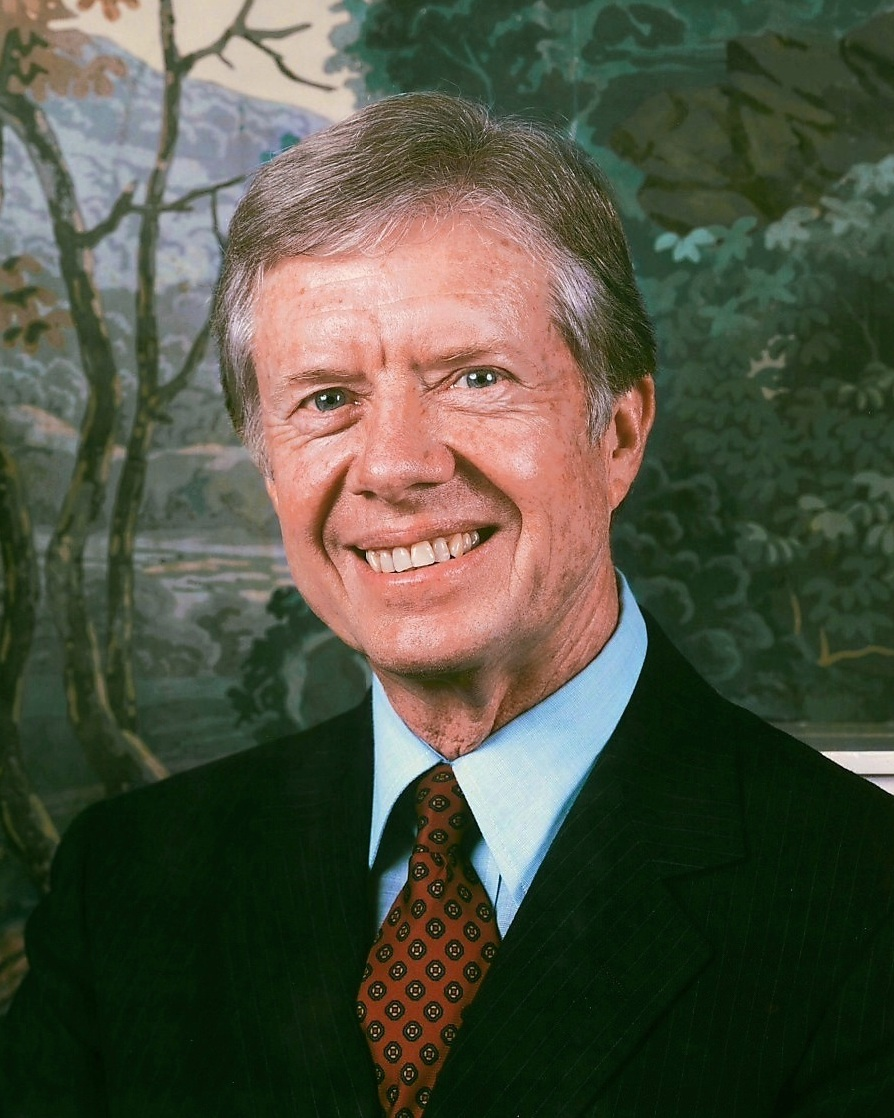

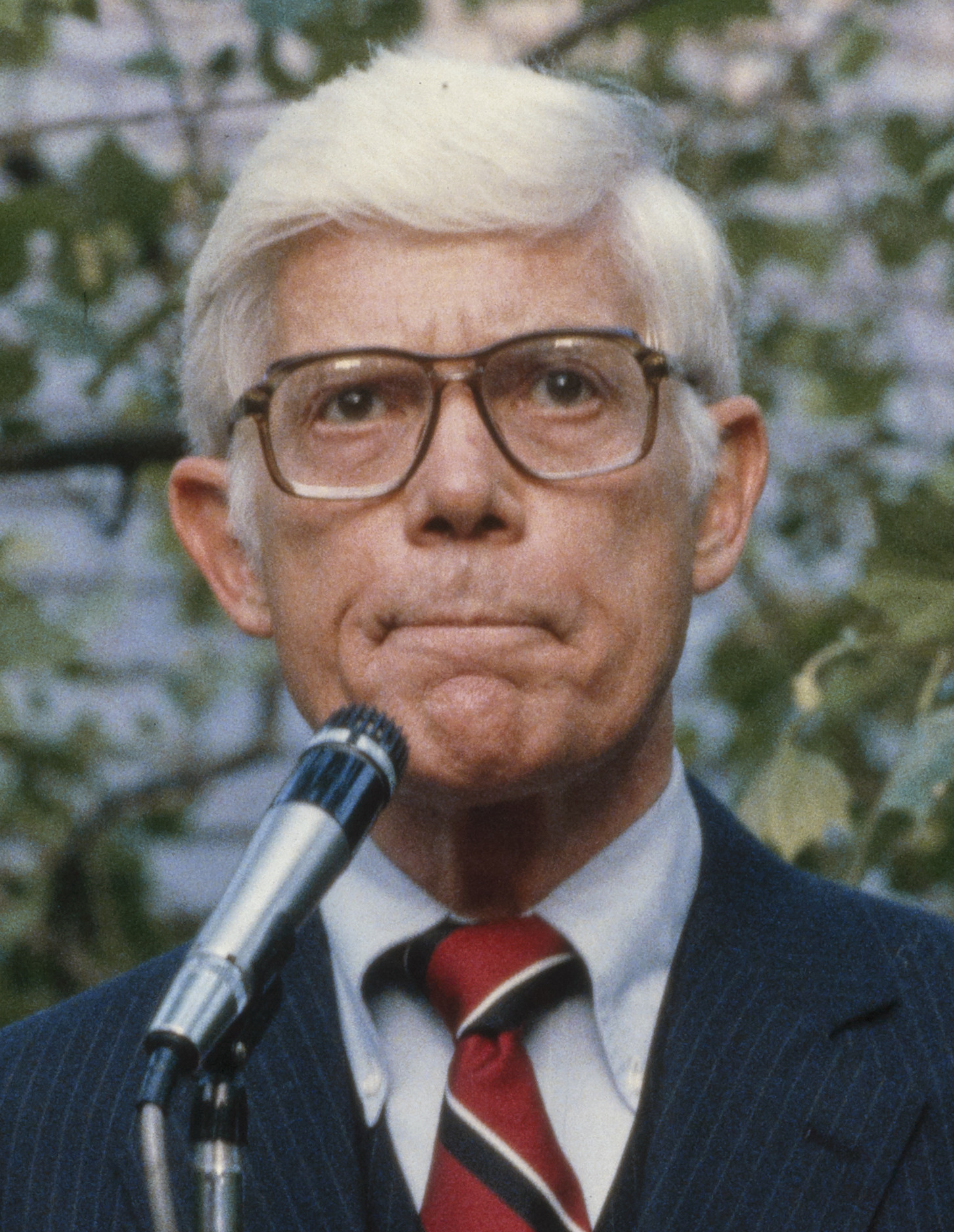
Nominee	Ronald Reagan	Jimmy Carter	John B. Anderson
Party	Republican	Democratic	Liberal
Alliance	Conservative
Home state	California	Georgia	Illinois
Running mate	George H. W. Bush	Walter Mondale	Patrick Lucey
Electoral vote	41	0	0
Popular vote	2,893,831	2,728,372	467,801
Percentage	46.66%	43.99%	7.54%
County results
Reagan
40–50%
50–60%
60–70%
Carter
40–50%
50–60%
60–70%
President before election
Jimmy Carter
Democratic
Elected President
Ronald Reagan
Republican

The 1980 United States presidential election in New York took place on November 4, 1980. All 50 states and the District of Columbia were part of the 1980 United States presidential election. Voters chose 41 electors to the Electoral College, which voted for President and Vice President.

New York was won by former California Governor Ronald Reagan, in a narrow victory against President of the United States Jimmy Carter, who failed to gain reelection against Reagan. Also in the running was Independent candidate Congressman John B. Anderson of Illinois, who ran in New York as the Liberal Party candidate.

Reagan won the state with a plurality of 46.66% of the vote to Carter's 43.99%, a margin of 2.67%. Anderson finished in third, with 7.54%. New York's election results reflect the Republican Party's re-consolidation of base under what is popularly called the "Reagan Revolution," which sounded various overwhelming conservative electoral victories across the United States throughout the 1980s – and most evidently against the relatively unpopular president Carter during the 1980 presidential election. New York weighed in for this election as more Democratic than the national average by about 7%.

This election is notable in that while the highly populated regions of New York City, Buffalo and Albany turned out for Carter, and the sparsely populated upstate counties turned out for Reagan, the election in the state was tipped by the downstate suburban counties around NYC, which were won by Reagan. Most notably, Reagan won in the Long Island suburban counties of Nassau and Suffolk by bigger vote number margins than in all of the counties that Carter won in the state except Manhattan. Carter actually picked up plurality wins in two counties where he had lost in 1976 to Gerald Ford: namely Monroe County, home to the city of Rochester (thereby making Reagan the first-ever Republican to win the White House without carrying this county), and Niagara County. Despite these two county gains by Carter, it wasn't enough for him to retain the state that he had won four years earlier, as Carter's winning margin in New York City was considerably lower than what it had been in 1976. This fact, combined with the big vote number margins that Reagan won by in the densely populated downstate counties outside New York City, enabled Reagan to overtake Carter in the popular vote statewide.

Another major contributing factor to Reagan's victory over Carter was the relatively strong third party showing by independent candidate John B. Anderson, a former liberal Republican congressman who garnered 7.54% of the vote in the State – nearly twice the 4% margin by which Carter had won New York in 1976. Running on the ballot line of New York's Liberal Party, Anderson attracted the votes of many liberals and moderates who normally leaned Democratic but were dissatisfied with the policies of the Carter Administration, and with Rockefeller Republicans who viewed Reagan as too far to the right, thus splitting the left-leaning vote in New York State.

== Primaries ==
1980 Democratic primary
Candidate	Votes	Delegates
Ted Kennedy	582,757	176
Jimmy Carter (incumbent)	406,305	123
Totals	989,062	299

1980 Republican primary*
Candidate	Delegates
Ronald Reagan	73
George H. W. Bush	6
John Anderson	1
Uncommitted	47
Totals	127

- Note: The Republican primary was not decided by votes for each candidate, but for their delegate slates in each and every congressional district.

== Results ==
1980 United States presidential election in New York
Party	Candidate	Votes	Percentage	Electoral votes
Republican	Ronald Reagan	2,637,700	42.53%	
Conservative	Ronald Reagan	256,131	4.13%	
Total	Ronald Reagan	2,893,831	46.66%	41
Democratic	Jimmy Carter (Incumbent)	2,728,372	43.99%	0
Liberal	John B. Anderson	467,801	7.54%	0
Free Libertarian	Ed Clark	52,648	0.85%	0
Right to Life	Ellen McCormack	24,159	0.39%	0
Citizens Party	Barry Commoner	23,186	0.37%	0
Communist	Gus Hall	7,414	0.12%	0
Socialist Workers	Clifton DeBerry	2,068	0.03%	0
Workers’ World	Deirdre Griswold	1,416	0.02%	0
Write-ins	—	1,064	0.02%	0
Totals		6,201,959	100.0%	41

=== New York City results ===
1980 presidential election in New York City		Manhattan	The Bronx	Brooklyn	Queens	Staten Island	Total	
Democratic	Jimmy Carter	275,742	181,090	288,893	269,147	37,306	1,052,178	54.87%
Democratic	Jimmy Carter	62.40%	64.02%	55.44%	47.98%	33.72%	1,052,178	54.87%
Republican- Conservative	Ronald Reagan	115,911	86,843	200,306	251,333	64,885	719,278	37.51%
Republican- Conservative	Ronald Reagan	26.23%	30.70%	38.43%	44.81%	58.64%	719,278	37.51%
Liberal	John B. Anderson	38,597	11,286	24,341	32,566	7,055	113,845	5.94%
Liberal	John B. Anderson	8.73%	3.99%	4.67%	5.81%	6.38%	113,845	5.94%
Citizens Party	Barry Commoner	5,361	685	2,266	1,889	225	10,426	0.54%
Citizens Party	Barry Commoner	1.21%	0.24%	0.43%	0.34%	0.20%	10,426	0.54%
Free Libertarian	Ed Clark	2,718	991	2,039	2,482	561	8,791	0.46%
Free Libertarian	Ed Clark	0.62%	0.35%	0.39%	0.44%	0.51%	8,791	0.46%
Right to Life	Ellen McCormack	862	995	1,615	2,227	518	6,217	0.32%
Right to Life	Ellen McCormack	0.20%	0.35%	0.31%	0.40%	0.47%	6,217	0.32%
Communist	Gus Hall	1,997	669	1,222	945	59	4,892	0.26%
Communist	Gus Hall	0.45%	0.24%	0.23%	0.17%	0.05%	4,892	0.26%
Socialist Workers	Clifton DeBerry	451	204	279	258	32	1,224	0.06%
Socialist Workers	Clifton DeBerry	0.10%	0.07%	0.05%	0.05%	0.03%	1,224	0.06%
Workers’ World	Deirdre Griswold	259	84	131	76	6	556	0.03%
Workers’ World	Deirdre Griswold	0.06%	0.03%	0.03%	0.01%	0.01%	556	0.03%
TOTAL		441,901	282,847	521,109	560,923	110,651	1,917,431	100.00%

=== Results by county ===
County	Ronald Reagan Republican/Conservative		Jimmy Carter Democratic		John B. Anderson Liberal		Ed Clark Free Libertarian		Ellen McCormack Right to Life		Barry Commoner Citizens		Various candidates Other parties		Margin		Total votes cast
County	#	%	#	%	#	%	#	%	#	%	#	%	#	%	#	%	Total votes cast
Albany	52,354	36.27%	74,429	51.56%	14,563	10.09%	1,723	1.19%	642	0.44%	502	0.35%	151	0.10%	−22,075	−15.29%	144,364
Allegany	10,423	59.09%	5,879	33.33%	973	5.52%	275	1.56%	44	0.25%	25	0.14%	21	0.12%	4,544	25.76%	17,640
Bronx	86,843	30.70%	181,090	64.02%	11,286	3.99%	991	0.35%	995	0.35%	685	0.24%	957	0.34%	−94,247	−33.32%	282,847
Broome	39,275	43.99%	37,013	41.46%	11,388	12.76%	969	1.09%	323	0.36%	206	0.23%	106	0.12%	2,262	2.53%	89,280
Cattaraugus	17,222	52.65%	12,917	39.49%	1,848	5.65%	477	1.46%	149	0.46%	42	0.13%	54	0.17%	4,305	13.16%	32,709
Cayuga	17,945	54.78%	11,708	35.74%	2,539	7.75%	360	1.10%	111	0.34%	47	0.14%	46	0.14%	6,237	19.04%	32,756
Chautauqua	30,081	51.20%	22,871	38.93%	4,699	8.00%	815	1.39%	142	0.24%	72	0.12%	76	0.13%	7,210	12.27%	58,756
Chemung	19,674	52.87%	14,565	39.14%	2,465	6.62%	327	0.88%	121	0.33%	38	0.10%	19	0.05%	5,109	13.73%	37,209
Chenango	10,400	53.08%	6,917	35.31%	1,908	9.74%	261	1.33%	57	0.29%	37	0.19%	12	0.06%	3,483	17.77%	19,592
Clinton	13,120	48.79%	11,498	42.76%	1,904	7.08%	193	0.72%	95	0.35%	60	0.22%	20	0.07%	1,622	6.03%	26,890
Columbia	13,946	53.08%	9,500	36.16%	2,204	8.39%	378	1.44%	125	0.48%	86	0.33%	35	0.13%	4,446	16.92%	26,274
Cortland	9,885	54.77%	6,176	34.22%	1,603	8.88%	249	1.38%	49	0.27%	55	0.30%	31	0.17%	3,709	20.55%	18,048
Delaware	10,609	55.36%	6,333	33.05%	1,865	9.73%	252	1.31%	35	0.18%	52	0.27%	18	0.09%	4,276	22.31%	19,164
Dutchess	53,616	57.65%	28,616	30.77%	8,824	9.49%	1,129	1.21%	388	0.42%	275	0.30%	159	0.17%	25,000	26.88%	93,007
Erie	169,209	40.24%	215,283	51.20%	29,580	7.03%	3,853	0.92%	1,381	0.33%	767	0.18%	400	0.10%	−46,074	−10.96%	420,473
Essex	9,025	53.16%	6,443	37.95%	1,213	7.14%	204	1.20%	45	0.27%	31	0.18%	17	0.10%	2,582	15.21%	16,978
Franklin	7,620	46.77%	7,281	44.69%	1,182	7.26%	88	0.54%	80	0.49%	30	0.18%	11	0.07%	339	2.08%	16,292
Fulton	11,448	53.19%	8,105	37.66%	1,566	7.28%	280	1.30%	72	0.33%	30	0.14%	21	0.10%	3,343	15.53%	21,522
Genesee	11,650	47.57%	10,677	43.60%	1,651	6.74%	346	1.41%	97	0.40%	29	0.12%	39	0.16%	973	3.97%	24,489
Greene	11,286	57.88%	6,488	33.28%	1,338	6.86%	220	1.13%	115	0.59%	29	0.15%	22	0.11%	4,798	24.60%	19,498
Hamilton	2,038	63.10%	925	28.64%	176	5.45%	52	1.61%	16	0.50%	20	0.62%	3	0.09%	1,113	34.46%	3,230
Herkimer	14,105	50.58%	11,497	41.23%	1,830	6.56%	321	1.15%	73	0.26%	40	0.14%	22	0.08%	2,608	9.35%	27,888
Jefferson	16,455	49.67%	13,271	40.06%	2,834	8.55%	387	1.17%	85	0.26%	71	0.21%	25	0.08%	3,184	9.61%	33,128
Kings	200,306	38.43%	288,893	55.44%	24,341	4.67%	2,039	0.39%	1,615	0.31%	2,266	0.43%	1,649	0.32%	−88,587	−17.01%	521,109
Lewis	4,937	50.26%	3,973	40.45%	716	7.29%	150	1.53%	32	0.33%	4	0.04%	10	0.10%	964	9.81%	9,822
Livingston	11,193	49.85%	9,030	40.22%	1,694	7.54%	400	1.78%	63	0.28%	47	0.21%	27	0.12%	2,163	9.63%	22,454
Madison	13,369	55.85%	7,843	32.77%	2,122	8.86%	444	1.85%	77	0.32%	53	0.22%	29	0.12%	5,526	23.08%	23,937
Monroe	128,615	41.93%	142,423	46.43%	29,118	9.49%	4,335	1.41%	980	0.32%	846	0.28%	416	0.14%	−13,808	−4.50%	306,733
Montgomery	11,917	49.48%	9,645	40.04%	2,080	8.64%	309	1.28%	72	0.30%	38	0.16%	27	0.11%	2,272	9.44%	24,088
Nassau	333,567	55.95%	207,602	34.81%	44,758	7.51%	3,463	0.58%	3,795	0.64%	2,257	0.38%	712	0.12%	125,965	21.14%	596,154
New York	115,911	26.23%	275,742	62.40%	38,597	8.73%	2,718	0.62%	862	0.20%	5,361	1.21%	2,710	0.61%	−159,831	−36.17%	441,901
Niagara	38,760	44.86%	40,405	46.77%	6,014	6.96%	816	0.94%	285	0.33%	72	0.08%	56	0.06%	−1,645	−1.91%	86,409
Oneida	51,968	49.59%	44,292	42.26%	6,929	6.61%	1,107	1.06%	308	0.29%	98	0.09%	97	0.09%	7,676	7.33%	104,799
Onondaga	97,887	50.62%	73,453	37.99%	18,805	9.72%	1,908	0.99%	695	0.36%	352	0.18%	272	0.14%	24,434	12.63%	193,372
Ontario	17,036	47.98%	14,477	40.77%	3,147	8.86%	606	1.71%	133	0.37%	66	0.19%	41	0.12%	2,559	7.21%	35,506
Orange	51,268	56.67%	30,022	33.18%	7,656	8.46%	948	1.05%	302	0.33%	151	0.17%	123	0.14%	21,246	23.49%	90,470
Orleans	7,536	51.58%	5,767	39.47%	977	6.69%	252	1.72%	41	0.28%	20	0.14%	18	0.12%	1,769	12.11%	14,611
Oswego	22,816	53.63%	15,343	36.07%	3,333	7.83%	810	1.90%	118	0.28%	65	0.15%	56	0.13%	7,473	17.56%	42,541
Otsego	11,814	49.42%	8,795	36.79%	2,874	12.02%	299	1.25%	47	0.20%	51	0.21%	27	0.11%	3,019	12.63%	23,907
Putnam	20,193	63.46%	8,691	27.31%	2,340	7.35%	294	0.92%	146	0.46%	112	0.35%	43	0.14%	11,502	36.15%	31,819
Queens	251,333	44.81%	269,147	47.98%	32,566	5.81%	2,482	0.44%	2,227	0.40%	1,889	0.34%	1,279	0.23%	−17,814	−3.17%	560,923
Rensselaer	32,005	45.89%	29,880	42.84%	6,443	9.24%	955	1.37%	270	0.39%	130	0.19%	64	0.09%	2,125	3.05%	69,747
Richmond	64,885	58.64%	37,306	33.72%	7,055	6.38%	561	0.51%	518	0.47%	225	0.20%	101	0.09%	27,579	24.92%	110,651
Rockland	59,068	56.26%	35,277	33.60%	8,709	8.29%	879	0.84%	484	0.46%	427	0.41%	151	0.14%	23,791	22.66%	104,993
Saratoga	34,184	52.30%	23,641	36.17%	6,201	9.49%	957	1.46%	194	0.30%	128	0.20%	57	0.09%	10,543	16.13%	65,362
Schenectady	32,003	45.37%	29,932	42.44%	7,146	10.13%	947	1.34%	206	0.29%	202	0.29%	98	0.14%	2,071	2.93%	70,534
Schoharie	6,382	52.05%	4,715	38.45%	940	7.67%	165	1.35%	30	0.24%	17	0.14%	13	0.11%	1,667	13.60%	12,262
Schuyler	3,838	55.17%	2,514	36.14%	476	6.84%	79	1.14%	14	0.20%	26	0.37%	10	0.14%	1,324	19.03%	6,957
Seneca	7,174	52.40%	5,010	36.60%	1,205	8.80%	199	1.45%	53	0.39%	34	0.25%	15	0.11%	2,164	15.80%	13,690
St. Lawrence	18,437	46.53%	17,006	42.92%	3,544	8.94%	319	0.81%	164	0.41%	115	0.29%	39	0.10%	1,431	3.61%	39,624
Steuben	22,418	58.73%	12,826	33.60%	2,257	5.91%	467	1.22%	121	0.32%	54	0.14%	27	0.07%	9,592	25.13%	38,170
Suffolk	256,294	57.00%	149,945	33.35%	34,743	7.73%	3,598	0.80%	2,827	0.63%	1,676	0.37%	573	0.13%	106,349	23.65%	449,655
Sullivan	15,089	55.44%	9,553	35.10%	2,095	7.70%	297	1.09%	104	0.38%	19	0.07%	61	0.22%	5,536	20.34%	27,218
Tioga	10,291	53.56%	6,690	34.82%	1,851	9.63%	261	1.36%	52	0.27%	33	0.17%	36	0.19%	3,601	18.74%	19,214
Tompkins	12,448	41.96%	11,970	40.35%	4,081	13.76%	305	1.03%	49	0.17%	764	2.58%	51	0.17%	478	1.61%	29,668
Ulster	36,709	55.01%	22,179	33.24%	5,995	8.98%	868	1.30%	184	0.28%	640	0.96%	151	0.23%	14,530	21.77%	66,726
Warren	13,264	59.28%	6,971	31.15%	1,766	7.89%	266	1.19%	59	0.26%	35	0.16%	16	0.07%	6,293	28.13%	22,377
Washington	12,835	58.59%	7,144	32.61%	1,501	6.85%	337	1.54%	48	0.22%	29	0.13%	12	0.05%	5,691	25.98%	21,906
Wayne	16,498	50.74%	12,590	38.72%	2,623	8.07%	628	1.93%	85	0.26%	55	0.17%	33	0.10%	3,908	12.02%	32,512
Westchester	198,552	54.37%	130,136	35.64%	30,119	8.25%	2,639	0.72%	1,587	0.43%	1,555	0.43%	578	0.16%	68,416	18.73%	365,166
Wyoming	8,108	55.72%	5,234	35.97%	855	5.88%	266	1.83%	58	0.40%	17	0.12%	14	0.10%	2,874	19.75%	14,552
Yates	4,694	55.99%	2,828	33.73%	690	8.23%	125	1.49%	14	0.17%	28	0.33%	5	0.06%	1,866	22.26%	8,384
Totals	2,893,831	46.66%	2,728,372	43.99%	467,801	7.54%	52,648	0.85%	24,159	0.39%	23,186	0.37%	11,962	0.19%	165,459	2.67%	6,201,959

==== Counties that flipped from Republican to Democratic ====
- Monroe
- Niagara

==== Counties that flipped from Democratic to Republican ====
- Sullivan

== Analysis ==
In the heavily populated, and very liberal, five boroughs of New York City, Carter still won overall, and Reagan made only modest gains in vote share over Gerald Ford's 1976 showing of 33%, with Reagan taking 37.5% in NYC in 1980. While Carter still won in 4 of the 5 boroughs, Carter bled considerable support in New York City to Anderson, with Carter's NYC vote percentage dropping from 66% in 1976 to only 55% in 1980. Since Democratic victories in New York State in that era depended on running up massive margins in New York City to overcome the rest of the state's Republican lean, the reduced vote number margin in New York City from vote-splitting would prove fatal to Carter's chances in 1980. While Reagan only bled about 1% off Republican base support in the state (winning a plurality in a 3-way-race with 46.66% while Gerald Ford had lost the state in a two-man race with 47.52% in 1976), Carter bled 8% off his 1976 support, falling from a 51.95% majority win in 1976 to a losing 43.99% in 1980, with most of these lost Democratic base votes going to Anderson instead.

1980 remains the last election in which a Republican presidential nominee has won traditionally rock-ribbed GOP Tompkins County in upstate New York, home to the college town of Ithaca, where Cornell University and Ithaca College are located. From the Republican Party's founding in 1854 all the way up to 1976, Tompkins County had been a Republican stronghold in presidential elections and had only gone Democratic in the landslides of 1912 and 1964, with Franklin D. Roosevelt never topping 40% in the county in a presidential election. With the Republican Party nationally being increasingly taken over by its conservative wing, the GOP's fortunes quickly began to fade in the county in the 1980s. Reagan narrowly won Tompkins County in 1980 with a plurality of 42% to Carter's 40%, while Anderson took nearly 14%, making it Anderson's strongest county in the state. Four years later in 1984, Tompkins County would vote against Reagan, and by 2004 had become the most Democratic county in all of upstate New York in giving 64.19% of the vote to John Kerry. Tompkins County later gave Barack Obama 70.09% of the vote in 2008, Joe Biden 73.51% of the vote in 2020, and Kamala Harris 73.84% of the vote in 2024.

1980 remains the last election where any presidential candidate would get at least 40 electoral votes from New York. After the 1980 census, the state's electoral votes would drop from 41 electoral votes to 36 votes.

Along with Maine, Michigan, Mississippi and Vermont, New York was one of the few states in which President Carter won counties that had gone to Ford in the previous presidential election, as Carter flipped both Monroe and Niagara counties.

== See also ==
- United States presidential elections in New York
- Presidency of Ronald Reagan
