= Revolutionary Communist League (Internationalist) =

- Abbreviation: RCL(I)
- Founded: 1968
- Dissolved: 1995
- Merged into: Communist Party USA
- Ideology: Trotskyism; Marcyism
- Political position: Far-left

The Revolutionary Communist League (Internationalist) was a small Trotskyist group in the US which existed in various forms between 1968 and the mid 1990s.

== History ==
Though they considered their ideological origins to be in the "Global Class War Tendency" which was led by Sam Marcy and Vincent Copeland within the Socialist Workers Party from 1948–1959, organizationally it began as a splinter of the Spartacist League in 1968. This first incarnation was simply known as the Revolutionary Communist League, and had a more "activist" orientation than the SL. They collaborated with the Workers World Party, Youth Against War and Fascism and other New Left elements within a united front group called the Coalition for an Anti-imperialist Movement or CO-AIM.

The original RCL merged with the WWP later that year. However they quickly found the WWP internal atmosphere "stultifying" and its commitment to world revolution "decayed beyond belief". They began to drift out during 1971 and established the New York Revolutionary Committee, which published several issues of a periodical called Common Ground. A year later this "evolution culminated in what was essentially a rebirth of the old RCL" adding (Internationalist) to the end of their name to reflect the development they had gone through. It originally had branches in New York City, Boston, and New Haven, but after several years the organization had only its New Haven group. Its publication was the Internationalist Worker and the Internationalist Worker Newsletter.

They attempted re-entry into the WWP in 1982, but were rejected in December of that year. In 1986 RCL(I) merged with Socialist Action. However, the group was soon to be expelled from SA. Later the group joined the Communist Party USA.

== Ideology ==
The RCL(I) defended various violent actions by New Leftists in the late 1960s and 1970s. In 1972 they stated that they "Unconditionally and with only the most marginal political criticism - all oriented toward integrating military policy with an overall revolutionary strategy" supported the Days of Rage, the bombing of defense research facilities on campus, the campaigns of the Weathermen and Black Liberation Army. In 1974, they announced that they supported the Symbionese Liberation Army as well.

On international issues it strongly supported the degenerated workers' states, even while advocating a change within them. They supported the Soviet Unions suppression of the Prague Spring, the strengthening of the Warsaw Pact, a healing of the Sino-Soviet split, Soviet and Chinese aid to defend the Korean, Cuban and Yemeni workers states, as well as revolutionary and national liberation struggles, and opposed Détente as an imperialist maneuver. Within the workers states they advocated a "rearming of the masses" into "peoples militias", the abolition of privileges for bureaucrats and the "restoration of Marxism-Leninism".

RCL-(I) viewed the Workers World Party as having abandoned Trotskyism to its political detriment..

== Activism ==
In the 1974, RCL-(I) organized the New Haven Political Defense Committee (NHPPDC) to defend a group of three Black Liberation Army members who were arrested in New Haven after a bank robbery and the shooting of a security guard.

== Publications ==
- Common Ground New York Revolutionary Committee Vol. 1, no. 1 (Jan. 1, 1972)-v. 1, no. 3 (May 20, 1972)
- Internationalist news letter New York Vol. 1, no. 1 (June 1972)-Vol. 2, no. 1 (Jan. 1974)
- Internationalist worker Vol. 1, no. 1 (June 1974)-v. 10, no. 5/6 (summer 1985) (published in New York 1974-1975; Boston 1975-1977; New Haven 1977-1985)
- Internationalist worker bulletin New Haven Vol. 1, no. 1 (July 1979)-v. 2, no. 1 (Feb. 1980)
- Whirlwinds of danger: in defense of the workers' state. New York : The League, 1973
- The Class character of the Chinese state by Vincent Copeland New Haven, CT: Distributed by Revolutionary Communist League (Internationalist), 1975
- The global class war and the destiny of American labor by Sam Marcy New Haven, CT : Distributed by Revolutionary Communist League (Internationalist), 1979
- Leninist logic and method for developing the forces committed to the "global class war" tradition: a review of the lessons of recent years by S Redfield New Haven, Conn: Revolutionary Communist League-(Internationalist), 1980
