= 1980 United States presidential election in Vermont =

- November 4, 1980

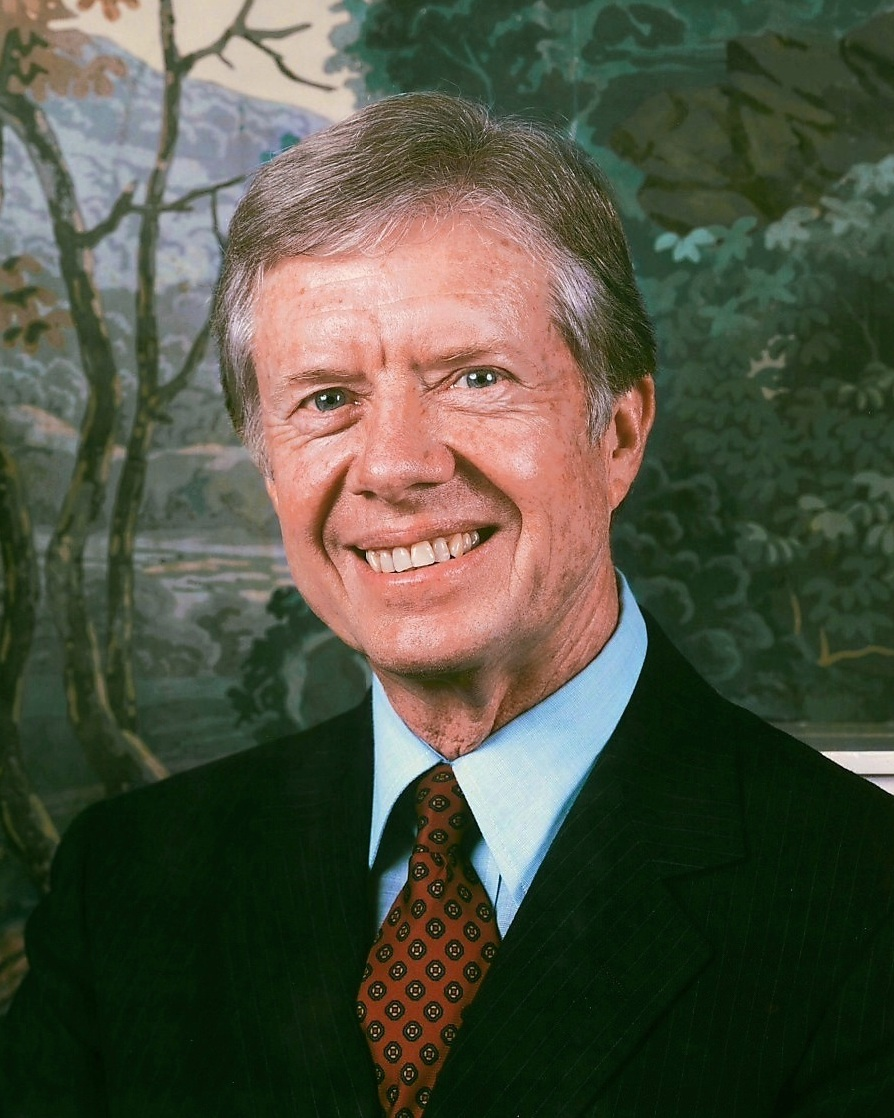

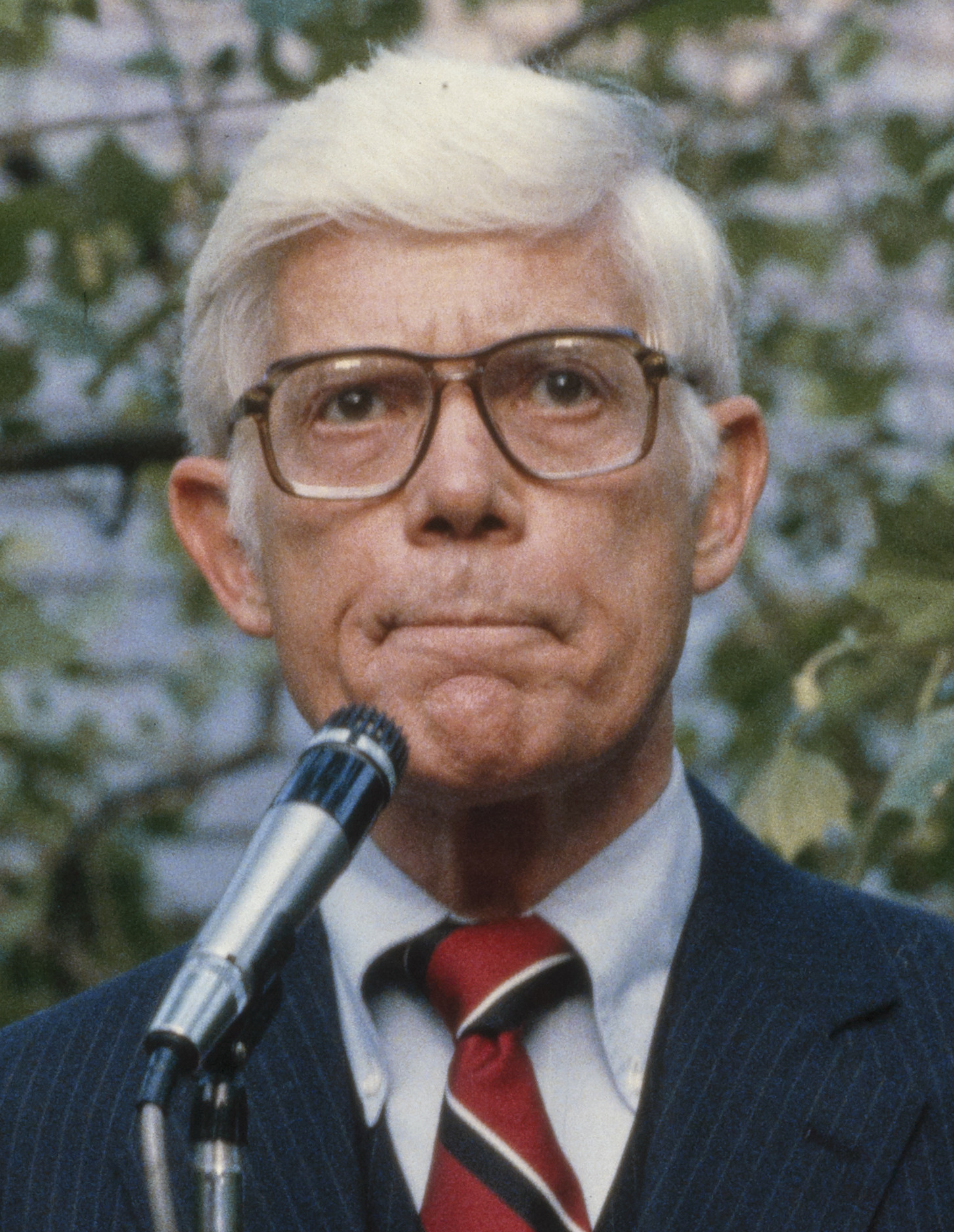
Nominee	Ronald Reagan	Jimmy Carter	John B. Anderson
Party	Republican	Democratic	Independent
Home state	California	Georgia	Illinois
Running mate	George H. W. Bush	Walter Mondale	Patrick Lucey
Electoral vote	3	0	0
Popular vote	94,598	81,891	31,760
Percentage	44.37%	38.41%	14.90%

Reagan
40–50%
50–60%
60–70%
70–80%
80–90%
Carter
30–40%
40–50%
50–60%
President before election
Jimmy Carter
Democratic
Elected President
Ronald Reagan
Republican

The 1980 United States presidential election in Vermont took place on November 4, 1980, as part of the 1980 United States presidential election which was held throughout all 50 states and the District of Columbia. Voters chose three representatives, or electors to the Electoral College, who voted for president and vice president. Vermont voted for the Republican nominee Ronald Reagan of California and his running mate George H.W. Bush of Texas. Reagan took 44.37% of the vote to incumbent Democratic President Jimmy Carter’s 38.41%, a victory margin of 5.96%. Independent John Anderson took 14.90%.

Long a bastion of liberal Republicanism, Vermont was the only state in the nation to swing Democratic in 1980, having delivered a more comfortable 11.20% margin of victory to moderate Republican Gerald Ford just four years earlier in 1976, even as the rest of the nation swung hard toward the GOP in 1980. Whereas Ford had swept every county in the state of Vermont, Reagan narrowly lost two Northwestern counties, Chittenden and Grand Isle, to Carter. Reagan became the first Republican to ever win without Grand Isle County.

The conservative Reagan would bleed a substantial amount of support in the state to John Anderson, who had been a liberal Republican congressman before mounting his independent bid for the presidency. Anderson proved very popular with liberal and moderate voters in New England who viewed Reagan as too far to the right and with normally leaning Democratic voters who were dissatisfied with the policies of the Carter Administration. New England overall would prove to be Anderson's strongest region in the nation, with all 6 New England states giving double-digit percentages to Anderson. Vermont would ultimately prove to be John Anderson’s second strongest state in the nation after neighboring Massachusetts, his 14.9% of the vote in the state more than double the 6.61% he got nationwide.

Along with Maine, New York, Mississippi and Michigan, Vermont was one of the few states in which President Carter won counties that had gone to Ford in the previous presidential election, as Carter flipped both Chittenden and Grand Isle counties.

To date, this is the last time that the towns of Brattleboro, Thetford, Vershire, and Woodbury voted Republican.

== Primaries ==
1980 Democratic Primary
Candidate	Votes	Delegates
Jimmy Carter (incumbent)	29,015	10
Ted Kennedy	10,135	4
Others	553	0
Totals	39,703	14

1980 Republican Primary
Candidate	Votes	Delegates
Ronald Reagan	19,720	6
John Anderson	19,030	6
George H.W. Bush	14,226	5
Howard Baker	8,055	3
Others	4,580	0
Totals	65,611	20

== Results ==
1980 United States presidential election in Vermont
Party	Candidate	Votes	Percentage	Electoral votes
Republican	Ronald Reagan	94,598	44.37%	3
Democratic	Jimmy Carter (incumbent)	81,891	38.41%	0
Independent	John Anderson	31,760	14.90%	0
Citizens	Barry Commoner	2,316	1.09%	0
Libertarian	Ed Clark	1,900	0.89%	0
No party	Write-ins	413	0.19%	0
Socialist	David McReynolds	136	0.06%	0
Communist	Gus Hall	118	0.06%	0
Socialist Workers	Clifton DeBerry	75	0.04%	0
Totals		213,207	100.00%	3
Voter Turnout (Voting age/Registered)				58%/68%

=== Results by county ===
County	Ronald Reagan Republican		Jimmy Carter Democratic		John B. Anderson Independent		Barry Commoner Citizens		Ed Clark Libertarian		Various candidates Other parties		Margin		Total votes cast
County	#	%	#	%	#	%	#	%	#	%	#	%	#	%	Total votes cast
Addison	5,216	44.85%	4,351	37.41%	1,751	15.06%	145	1.25%	145	1.25%	22	0.19%	865	7.44%	11,630
Bennington	6,091	44.39%	5,361	39.07%	1,978	14.42%	99	0.72%	151	1.10%	41	0.30%	730	5.32%	13,721
Caledonia	5,986	56.88%	3,284	31.21%	1,068	10.15%	80	0.76%	65	0.62%	40	0.38%	2,702	25.67%	10,523
Chittenden	18,310	39.00%	18,967	40.40%	8,409	17.91%	677	1.44%	406	0.86%	174	0.37%	-657	-1.40%	46,943
Essex	1,305	55.77%	799	34.15%	148	6.32%	6	0.26%	77	3.29%	5	0.21%	506	21.62%	2,340
Franklin	5,998	44.61%	5,914	43.99%	1,350	10.04%	73	0.54%	80	0.60%	30	0.22%	84	0.62%	13,445
Grand Isle	947	42.28%	999	44.60%	260	11.61%	9	0.40%	19	0.85%	6	0.27%	-52	-2.32%	2,240
Lamoille	3,228	46.85%	2,414	35.04%	1,048	15.21%	103	1.49%	76	1.10%	21	0.30%	814	11.81%	6,890
Orange	4,656	49.52%	3,079	32.75%	1,371	14.58%	149	1.58%	93	0.99%	54	0.57%	1,577	16.77%	9,402
Orleans	4,473	48.69%	3,671	39.96%	865	9.42%	54	0.59%	92	1.00%	32	0.35%	802	8.73%	9,187
Rutland	11,142	45.98%	9,596	39.60%	3,174	13.10%	102	0.42%	155	0.64%	65	0.27%	1,546	6.38%	24,234
Washington	9,714	41.96%	9,559	41.29%	3,256	14.06%	339	1.46%	198	0.86%	85	0.37%	155	0.67%	23,151
Windham	7,062	42.55%	5,830	35.12%	3,167	19.08%	296	1.78%	144	0.87%	99	0.60%	1,232	7.43%	16,598
Windsor	10,470	45.71%	8,067	35.22%	3,915	17.09%	184	0.80%	199	0.87%	68	0.30%	2,403	10.49%	22,903
Totals	94,598	44.37%	81,891	38.41%	31,760	14.90%	2,316	1.09%	1,900	0.89%	742	0.35%	12,707	5.96%	213,207

==== Counties flipped from Republican to Democratic ====
- Chittenden
- Grand Isle

== Analysis ==
With Reagan only winning 44.37% of the popular vote, he became the first Republican presidential candidate to win Vermont's popular vote with only a plurality since William Howard Taft won the state with only 37.13% of the vote back in 1912. This marked the second and final time to date that has happened. This election would mark the beginning of Vermont’s transition from a staunchly Republican state to being one of the most Democratic states. Ronald Reagan represented the ascendency of the conservative movement within the modern Republican Party, a party which would become increasingly dominated by conservatives, Southerners, and Evangelical Christians during and after Reagan's administration. Vermont would consequently begin shifting increasingly toward the Democrats in the years to come. It is a highly Democratic state today, as of 2020, as it has been for over 25 years.

Future Senator Bernie Sanders served as one of three electors for the Socialist Workers Party in Vermont.

== See also ==
- United States presidential elections in Vermont
