= 1980 United States presidential election in Maine =

- November 4, 1980

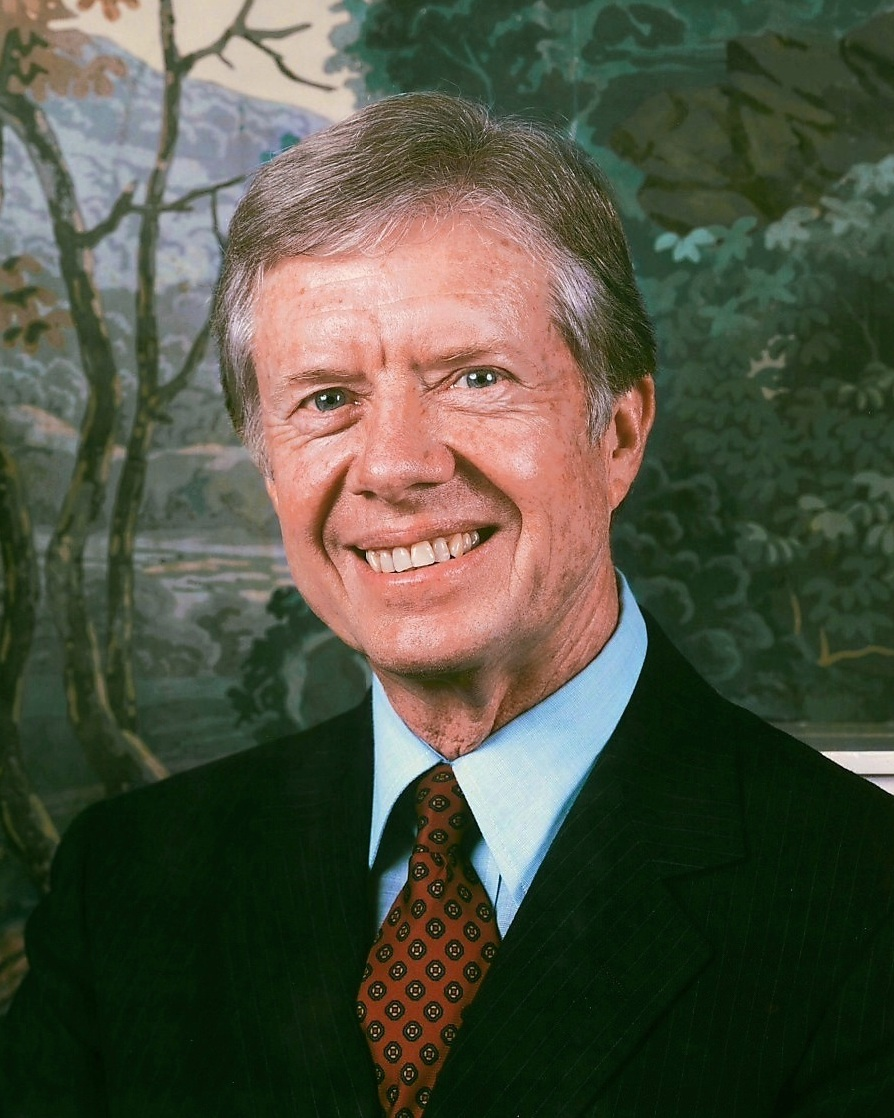

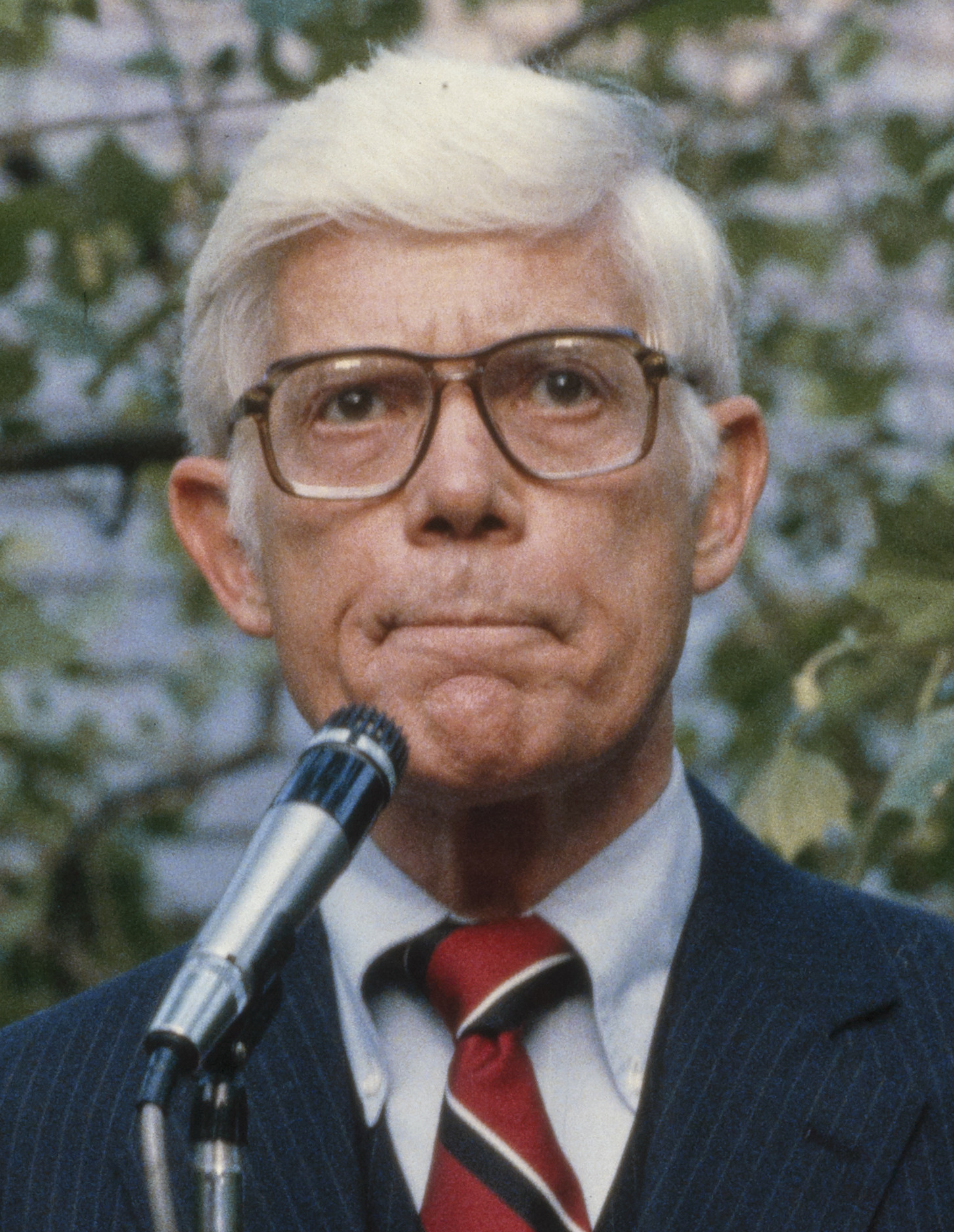
Nominee	Ronald Reagan	Jimmy Carter	John B. Anderson
Party	Republican	Democratic	Independent
Home state	California	Georgia	Illinois
Running mate	George H. W. Bush	Walter Mondale	Patrick Lucey
Electoral vote	4	0	0
Popular vote	238,522	220,974	53,327
Percentage	45.61%	42.25%	10.20%

Reagan
40–50%
50–60%
60–70%
70–80%
Carter
30–40%
40–50%
50–60%
60–70%
70–80%
80–90%
Tie
President before election
Jimmy Carter
Democratic
Elected President
Ronald Reagan
Republican

The 1980 United States presidential election in Maine took place on November 4, 1980. All fifty states and The District of Columbia were part of the 1980 United States presidential election. Voters chose four electors to the Electoral College, who voted for president and vice president. Maine was won by former California Governor Ronald Reagan (R) by a slim margin of 3%, carrying fourteen out of sixteen counties. In recent years, however, the state has grown much more liberal, and no Republican presidential nominee has carried it since 1988.

The already embattled incumbent Democratic president Carter was hurt in the state by the strong third party candidacy of John B. Anderson, a liberal Republican Congressman who ran in 1980 as an independent after failing to win the Republican Party's own presidential nomination. Anderson proved very popular with liberal and moderate voters in New England who normally leaned Democratic but were dissatisfied with the policies of the Carter administration and viewed Reagan as too far to the right. New England overall would prove to be Anderson's strongest region in the nation, with all six New England states giving double-digit percentages to Anderson. However, Maine would prove to be Anderson's weakest state in New England with only 10.20% of the popular vote, whereas all five of the other states in New England gave Anderson over 12% of the popular vote, peaking at 15.15% in Massachusetts.

Along with Michigan, New York, Mississippi and Vermont, Maine was one of the few states in which President Carter won counties that had gone to Ford in the previous presidential election, as Carter flipped Cumberland County. As a result, Reagan was the first Republican to ever win a presidential election without this county. This was the last presidential election in which Hancock County was the most Republican county in Maine.

== Primaries ==
1980 Democratic Caucus (10/02/1980)
Candidate	CDE	Delegates
Jimmy Carter (incumbent)	13,660	10
Ted Kennedy	12,041	10
Jerry Brown	4,494	3
Totals	30,195	23

== Results ==
Electoral results
Presidential candidate	Party	Home state	Popular vote		Electoral vote	Running mate		
Presidential candidate	Party	Home state	Count	Percentage	Electoral vote	Vice-presidential candidate	Home state	Electoral vote
Ronald Reagan	Republican	California	238,522	45.61%	4	George H. W. Bush	Texas	4
Jimmy Carter (incumbent)	Democrat	Georgia	220,974	42.25%	0	Walter Mondale (incumbent)	Minnesota	0
John B. Anderson	Independent	Illinois	53,327	10.20%	0	Patrick Lucey	Wisconsin	0
Ed Clark	Libertarian	California	5,119	0.98%	0	David Koch	New York	0
Barry Commoner	Citizens	New York	4,394	0.84%	0	LaDonna Harris	Oklahoma	0
Gus Hall	Communist	New York	591	0.11%	0	Angela Davis	California	0
Write-in candidates	—	—	84	0.02%	0	—	—	0
Total			523,011	100%	4			4
Needed to win					270			270

=== Results by congressional district ===
Reagan won both of Maine's congressional districts.

District	Reagan	Carter	Representative
1st	45.02%	41.93%	David F. Emery
2nd	46.29%	42.62%	Olympia Snowe

=== Results by county ===
County	Ronald Reagan Republican		Jimmy Carter Democratic		John B. Anderson Independent		Ed Clark Libertarian		Barry Commoner Citizens		Various candidates Other parties		Margin		Total votes cast
County	#	%	#	%	#	%	#	%	#	%	#	%	#	%	Total votes cast
Androscoggin	18,399	39.93%	22,715	49.29%	4,300	9.33%	414	0.90%	218	0.47%	34	0.07%	-4,316	-9.36%	46,080
Aroostook	16,343	48.29%	14,492	42.82%	2,528	7.47%	275	0.81%	107	0.32%	101	0.30%	1,851	5.47%	33,846
Cumberland	45,820	42.64%	47,337	44.05%	12,214	11.37%	870	0.81%	1,088	1.01%	132	0.12%	-1,517	-1.41%	107,461
Franklin	5,680	46.83%	4,979	41.05%	1,205	9.94%	108	0.89%	145	1.20%	11	0.09%	701	5.78%	12,128
Hancock	11,435	53.60%	7,027	32.94%	2,300	10.78%	270	1.27%	259	1.21%	43	0.20%	4,408	20.66%	21,334
Kennebec	21,517	43.84%	20,943	42.67%	5,553	11.31%	505	1.03%	500	1.02%	59	0.12%	574	1.17%	49,077
Knox	7,631	48.98%	5,732	36.79%	1,842	11.82%	165	1.06%	194	1.25%	17	0.11%	1,899	12.19%	15,581
Lincoln	7,434	52.14%	4,776	33.49%	1,556	10.91%	237	1.66%	240	1.68%	16	0.11%	2,658	18.65%	14,259
Oxford	11,041	47.04%	9,914	42.23%	2,063	8.79%	237	1.01%	186	0.79%	33	0.14%	1,127	4.81%	23,474
Penobscot	28,869	45.97%	26,519	42.23%	6,287	10.01%	642	1.02%	393	0.63%	83	0.13%	2,350	3.74%	62,793
Piscataquis	4,015	46.93%	3,550	41.50%	781	9.13%	147	1.72%	56	0.65%	6	0.07%	465	5.43%	8,555
Sagadahoc	5,946	45.23%	5,663	43.08%	1,252	9.52%	124	0.94%	151	1.15%	9	0.07%	283	2.15%	13,145
Somerset	9,286	47.59%	8,115	41.59%	1,673	8.57%	250	1.28%	166	0.85%	23	0.12%	1,171	6.00%	19,513
Waldo	6,514	49.57%	4,883	37.16%	1,304	9.92%	203	1.54%	212	1.61%	24	0.18%	1,631	12.41%	13,140
Washington	7,180	48.55%	6,050	40.91%	1,301	8.80%	130	0.88%	108	0.73%	19	0.13%	1,130	7.64%	14,788
York	31,412	46.31%	28,279	41.69%	7,168	10.57%	542	0.80%	371	0.55%	65	0.10%	3,133	4.62%	67,837
Totals	238,522	45.61%	220,974	42.25%	53,327	10.20%	5,119	0.98%	4,394	0.84%	675	0.13%	17,548	3.36%	523,011

==== Counties that flipped from Republican to Democratic ====
- Cumberland

==== Counties that flipped from Democratic to Republican ====
- Kennebec
- Somerset
- York

== See also ==
- United States presidential elections in Maine
- Presidency of Ronald Reagan
