= Gavrielle Holmes =

American politician

- Occupation: Politician
- Political party: Workers World Party

Gavrielle Holmes, also known as Gavrielle Gemma, is an American communist politician. She was a third-party candidate (Workers World Party) for President of the United States in the 1984 election, receiving votes in Ohio (2,565) and Rhode Island. For other states, the presidential candidate that year was Larry Holmes.

She had also been the running mate for Deirdre Griswold in the 1980 U.S. presidential election in some states.

She is currently living in New Orleans, Louisiana, and is a member of the New Orleans Workers Group. She is an organizer of Takem Down Nola, a group of civil rights activists that successfully fought to remove five Confederate statues from the city.

Preceded by none	Workers World Party vice presidential candidate 1980 (lost)	Succeeded by Gloria LaRiva
Preceded by Deirdre Griswold	Workers World Party presidential candidate 1984 (lost)	Succeeded by Larry Holmes
