= Sara Flounders =

American writer and socialist activist

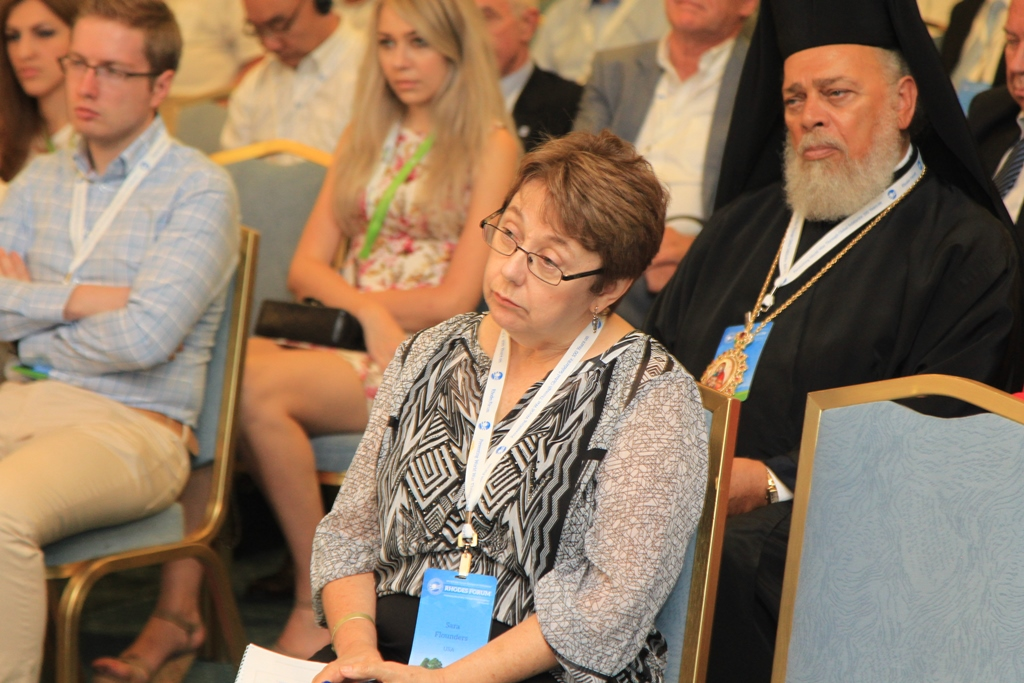
Sara Flounders at Rhodes Forum 2014

Sara Flounders is an American writer, socialist activist, secretariat member of the Marxist-Leninist Workers World Party (WWP) and director of the International Action Center.

Flounders organized delegations to Iraq during the years when international sanctions were in place, following the 1991 Gulf War. She participated in demonstrations against the Iraq War and in support of a Palestinian state during the Bush administration.

Sociologist David Walls was critical of a 2000 volume of Project Censored which had commended an article by Flounders published in the July 1998 issue of Worker's World. Walls wrote that, in the article, Flounders had said the Serbian controlled Trepca mines in Kosovo were sought after by American and European capitalists. Walls wrote that this was untrue due to the prices of the minerals having declined over the previous decade, and described the claim as ironic due to Slobodan Milošević having attempted to privatize the mine and sell it to a Greek company.

She has alleged that slave labor is present in U.S. prisons which has disproportionately affected people of color. She organized a rally in 2010 in support of the Ground Zero mosque, saying "Our message is we stand together in face of racism, a mobilization for war and against anti-Muslim bigotry." She joined American politician Cynthia McKinney in 2012 to campaign for the release of Pakistani national Aafia Siddiqui from U.S. detention. In 2021, she campaigned in support Venezuelan diplomat Alex Saab amidst allegations from some activists that he faced mistreatment and unjust imprisonment.

Flounders is a co-author and editor of over 10 books on U.S. militarism and war. She is a regular contributor to Workers World, the official newspaper of the WWP. Her recent books include “Capitalism on a Ventilator – The Impact of COVID-19 in China and the U.S.” World View Forum in 2020, which was initially banned by Amazon. In 2023 she released the anthology: “SANCTIONS – A Wrecking Ball in a Global Economy”, focusing on the impact of U.S. sanctions on over 40 countries. Her views have been reported in outlets such as Aporrea, TRT World, The Daily Star, and Jornal do Brasil.

== Publications ==
- Flounders, Sara (1998), NATO in the Balkans: Voices of Opposition by Ramsey Clark and others, World View Forum, ISBN 978-0-9656916-2-8
- Flounders, Sara (1998), Challenge to Genocide: Let Iraq Live, World View Forum, ISBN 978-0-9656916-4-2
- Flounders, Sara (2004), Haiti: A Slave Revolution: 200 Years After 1804, World View Forum, ISBN 978-0974752105
- Flounders, Sara (2005), Depleted Uranium: How the Pentagon Radiates Soldiers & Civilians with DU Weapons (2nd ed.), NYC: World View Forum, ISBN 978-0965691604
- Flounders, Sara (2012), War Without Victory: The Pentagon's Achilles Heel (1st ed.), NYC: World View Forum, ISBN 978-0895671776
- Flounders, Sara (2020), Capitalism on a Ventilator: The Impact of COVID-19 in China & the U.S., World View Forum, ISBN 978-0-89567-196-7
- Flounders, Sara (2025), China Changes Everything, World View Forum, ISBN 978-0-89567-206-3
