= Gloria La Riva =

American activist and perennial candidate (born 1954)

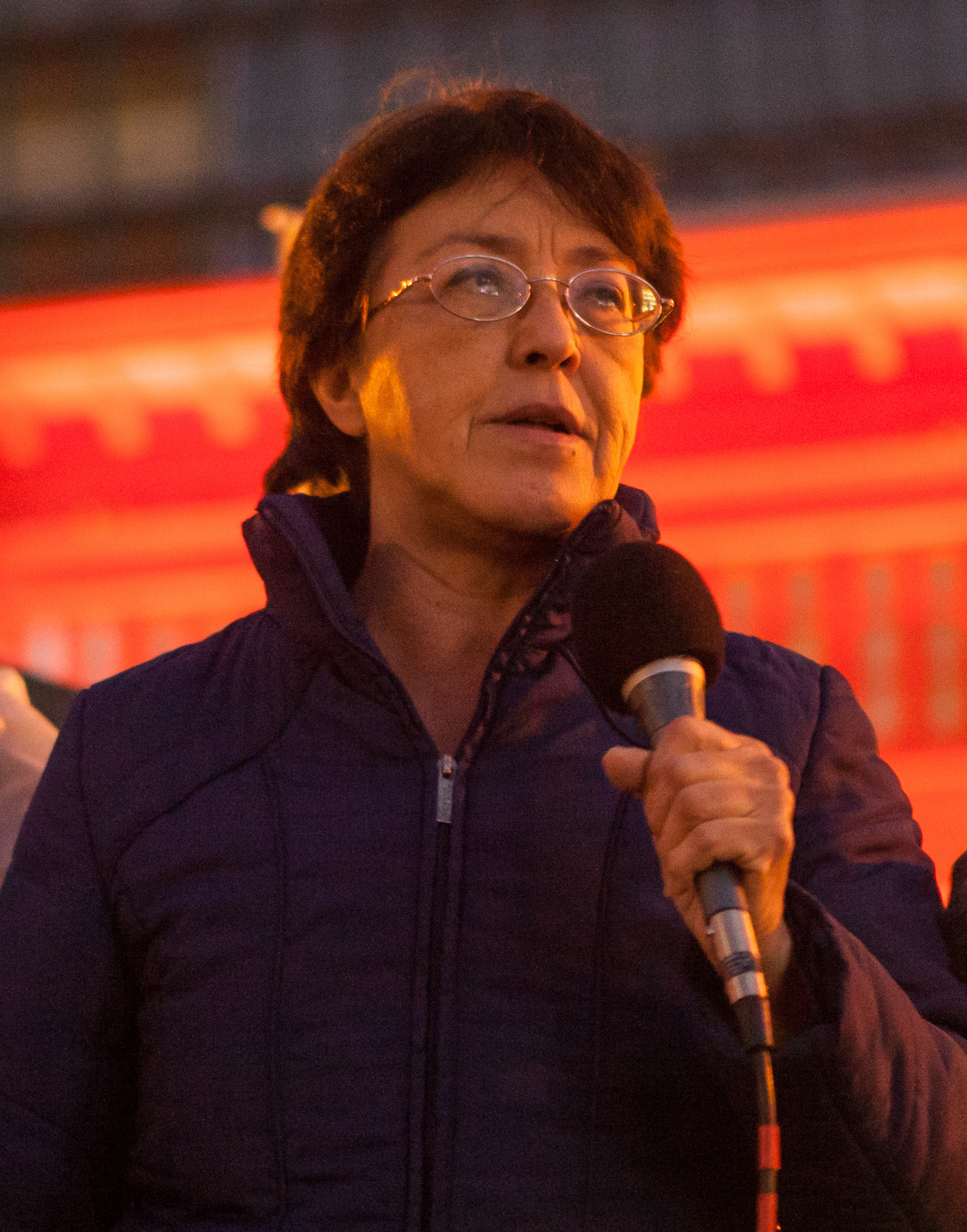
- La Riva in 2017
- Born: August 13, 1954 (age 72); Albuquerque, New Mexico, U.S.
- Education: Brandeis University
- Occupations: Newspaper printer, activist, politician
- Political party: Party for Socialism and Liberation; Peace and Freedom Party
- Other political affiliations: Workers World Party (until 2004)

Gloria Estela La Riva (born August 13, 1954) is an American perennial political candidate and communist activist with the Party for Socialism and Liberation (PSL) and the Peace and Freedom Party. She was the PSL's nominee and the Peace and Freedom Party's nominee in the 2020 presidential election, her tenth consecutive run as either a presidential or vice presidential candidate. She was previously a member of the Workers World Party. She ran as the PSL's nominee and the Peace and Freedom Party's nominee in the 2016 presidential election, with Eugene Puryear and Dennis J. Banks as her running mates respectively. She was the PSL's presidential nominee in the 2008 presidential election. For the 2020 election, Sunil Freeman was her running mate.

== Life and career ==
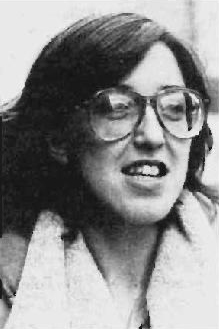
La Riva c. 1988

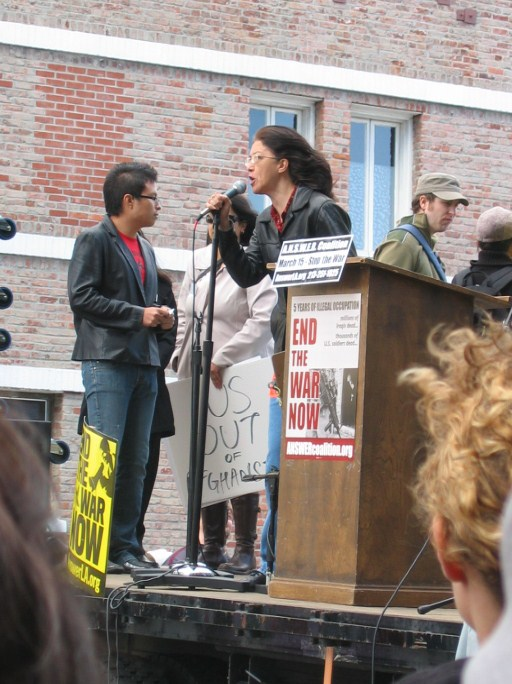
La Riva in 2008

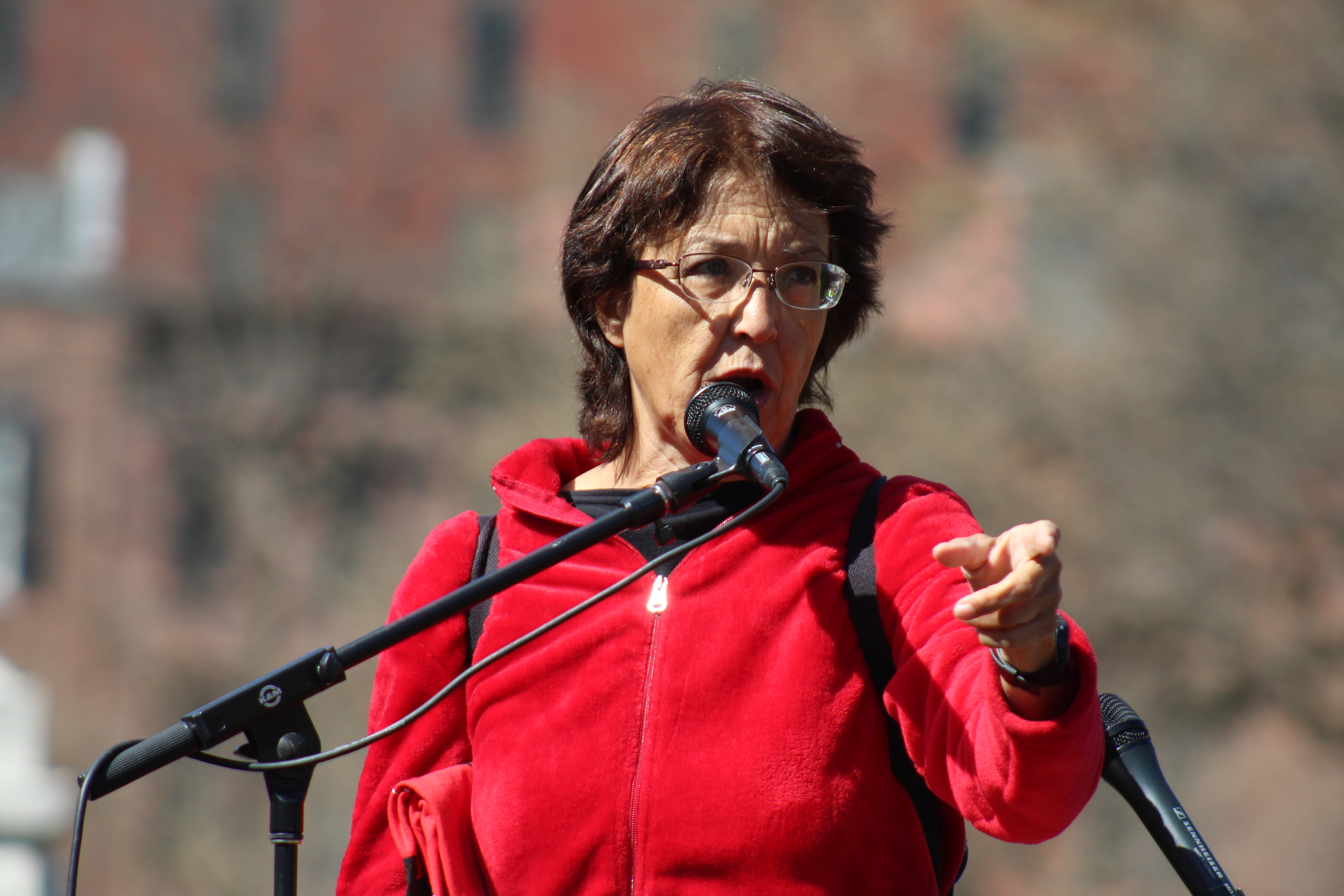
La Riva speaking at a protest against U.S. intervention in Venezuela, 2019

La Riva was born in Albuquerque, New Mexico, on August 13, 1954. She graduated from high school and began attending Brandeis University in 1972. She was a third-party candidate for president of the United States in the 1992 presidential election, representing the Workers World Party. She had also been the Workers World Party vice-presidential candidate in the elections of 1984, 1988, 1996, and 2000.

La Riva is a founding member of the Party for Socialism and Liberation.

La Riva was also the Peace and Freedom Party candidate for Governor of California in 1994, receiving 72,774 votes (0.9%). She ran again in the 1998 gubernatorial election, capturing 59,218 votes (0.71%). She also ran for San Francisco Mayor in 1983 (7,328 votes – 5.4%), coming in third overall, and second in the working class wards of the city, and 1991 (2,552 votes – 1.4%), and for Congress in 2010 (3rd place – 3%).

In the 2008 presidential election, La Riva received 6,821 votes, the 10th highest vote total. La Riva has also been the director of the National Committee to Free the Cuban Five, and president of the typographical sector of the Northern California Media Workers Union.

In 2010, La Riva was the Peace and Freedom Party's candidate for the U.S. Congress in California's 8th Congressional District. Running against Democratic House Speaker Nancy Pelosi, she came in third, receiving 5,161 votes, 3% of the overall vote. Also in 2010, La Riva was awarded the Friendship Medal by the Cuban Council of State.

In the 2012 presidential election, La Riva was a presidential stand-in for Peta Lindsay, the PSL nominee for president who was not allowed on the ballot in some states due to her age. La Riva was on the ballot in Colorado, Iowa, Utah, and Wisconsin, and she received 1,608 votes, or less than 0.01% of the total votes.

In July 2015, she was announced as the PSL's 2016 presidential nominee, with Eugene Puryear as her running mate. She attained ballot access in eight states: California, Colorado, Iowa, Louisiana, New Jersey, New Mexico, Vermont, and Washington. She received 74,401 votes in the election, or 0.05% of the total votes.

La Riva was a candidate for the Peace and Freedom Party nomination for Governor of California in 2018. She received 19,075 votes in the nonpartisan blanket primary, or 0.3% of the total votes.

She received the Party of Socialism and Liberation nomination for the 2020 presidential election, with Leonard Peltier as her running mate. Peltier later stepped down from the ticket due to his deteriorating health and was replaced by Sunil Freeman. Additionally, she won the Peace & Freedom Party primary in California for the 2020 United States presidential election, beating Green Party candidate Howie Hawkins. She also won the nomination of the Liberty Union Party in Vermont. She obtained no electoral votes in the election, and a total of 85,623 nationally, or about 0.05% of the total, being sixth most voted candidate, after Rocky de la Fuente, and ahead of Kanye West.

=== Other activities ===
La Riva has translated Fidel Castro's book Cuba at the Crossroads (1997) ISBN 1-875284-94-X, and produced the documentary videos NATO Targets, Workers' Democracy in Cuba (1996), Genocide by Sanctions: The Case of Iraq (1998), and Let Iraq Live!

=== Personal life ===
La Riva is married to Richard Becker, PSL co-founder and brother of A.N.S.W.E.R. Coalition founder Brian Becker.

Party political offices
Preceded by Gavrielle Holmes	Workers World Party vice presidential candidate 1984 (lost), 1988 (lost)	Succeeded by Larry Holmes
Preceded by Larry Holmes	Workers World Party presidential candidate 1992 (lost)	Succeeded by Monica Moorehead
Preceded by Maria Elizabeth Muñoz	Peace and Freedom Party California gubernatorial candidate 1994 (lost), 1998 (lost)	Succeeded by C. T. Weber
Preceded by Larry Holmes	Workers World Party vice presidential candidate 1996 (lost), 2000 (lost)	Succeeded by Teresa Gutierrez
Preceded by None	Party for Socialism and Liberation presidential candidate 2008	Succeeded by Peta Lindsay
Preceded by Peta Lindsay	Party for Socialism and Liberation presidential candidate 2016, 2020	Succeeded by incumbent
