= Andy Stapp =

American teacher

- Born: March 25, 1944; Philadelphia, Pennsylvania, US
- Died: September 3, 2014 (aged 70); New York City, US
- Occupation(s): Activist, teacher
- Known for: American Servicemen's Union

Andrew Dean Stapp (March 25, 1944 – September 3, 2014) was an American activist known for forming the American Servicemen's Union, an unofficial union for the U.S. military, in opposition to the Vietnam War.

Stapp began as a student activist until he was drafted into the U.S. Army in 1966. There he rallied anti-war sentiment, leading to two highly publicized courts-martial. After establishing the American Servicemen's Union, Stapp was discharged for subversive activity. He was married to Deirdre Griswold; both were members of the Workers World Party.

== Early life ==
Stapp was born March 25, 1944, in Philadelphia, Pennsylvania, to a military nurse. He was adopted from an orphanage by William and Martha Stapp. He grew up in the suburbs of Philadelphia with his older brother William.

Stapp enrolled at Pennsylvania State University to study history. He began questioning the Vietnam War during an archaeology expedition in Egypt, where he learned about the country's colonial history under British rule. Stapp participated in a sit-in on Hiroshima Day in 1965, where he was arrested for disorderly conduct and accused police of throwing tear gas into locked vans of arrestees. He became involved with the anti-Vietnam War movement on campus and served as president of SENSE, Students for Peace. He and three other students burned their draft cards and were kicked out of school. Frustrated by difficulties building draft resistance among other students, Stapp decided to build resistance within the military.

== Military career and activism ==
Stapp was drafted into the Army in May 1966. He had trouble enlisting because of his arrest record and destroyed draft card but convinced his local draft board that he had had a change of heart. He was stationed in Oklahoma at Fort Sill. He formed an informal group with whom he collected leftist literature and engaged in minor annoyance actions. Once the Army realized he was "a left-wing radical" they wanted to isolate him in his own room, but only officers had private rooms. Instead, they surrounded him with soldiers they thought were the "most Army type." According to Stapp, "Well, they were just the first two guys won over."

After their library was surrendered for inspection and not returned, Stapp locked his footlocker and refused to open it. He was charged with disobeying an order and requested a court-martial for what was a minor offense so that he could use the opportunity to broadcast his beliefs. The Emergency Civil Liberties Committee had attorney Victor Rabinowitz work on the case and sent attorney David Rein to defend Stapp. In what was one of the earliest anti-war protests on a military base, soldiers and civilians appeared at the trial and chanted anti-war slogans. Nevertheless, Stapp was convicted and served 45 days of hard labor. Private Paul Ilg, who attended the trial, accused a lieutenant of perjury for claiming to have initiated the original order. Ilg was charged with and convicted showing disrespect to a superior officer.

The second court-martial was for allegedly leaving his barracks without authorization. Youth Against War and Fascism sent several sympathizers to the trial, and Stapp began spending time with one of the activists, Deirdre Griswold. He was widely popular at the base and his acquittal was cheered by fellow soldiers. When Stapp took a leave in late 1967, he married Griswold and they began forming the American Servicemen's Union. He also took over publication of The Bond, an early GI underground press publication that amassed a readership of over 20,000 over the course of its publication. Stapp advocated for a right to refuse orders, racial equality, freedom of association, a right to trial by jury, election of officers, and a federal minimum wage.

The Army dishonorably discharged Stapp in 1968 for subversive activity. After his appeals through military channels were unsuccessful, he filed suit against the secretary of the Army. A judge ruled in Stapp's favor, stating that "there is not a scintilla of evidence connecting these allegedly guilty associations with Private Stapp's performance of his military duties," and the discharge was amended to an honorable discharge. When Esquire magazine published a profile in August 1968 on Stapp and his organizing activity, the article was banned from the base exchange.

== Later activity ==
After his discharge, Stapp continued expanding the American Servicemen's Union. He was arrested and released at Fort Lewis in 1969 for holding an unauthorized meeting. With the support of the American Civil Liberties Union's Seattle office, Stapp filed a lawsuit in response. Stapp began organizing with the Workers World Party and the affiliated Youth Against War and Fascism. He published the autobiography Up Against the Brass in 1970. Stapp worked at the Hudson School in Hoboken, New Jersey, teaching history from 1982 until his death in 2014.

== See also ==
- Concerned Officers Movement
- Donald W. Duncan
- Fort Hood Three
- Free The Army tour
- GI's Against Fascism
- GI Coffeehouses
- Movement for a Democratic Military
- Opposition to United States involvement in the Vietnam War
- Presidio mutiny
- Sir! No Sir!, a documentary about the anti-war movement within the ranks of the United States Armed Forces
- Stop Our Ship (SOS) anti-Vietnam War movement in and around the U.S. Navy
- Vietnam Veterans Against the War
- Waging Peace in Vietnam
- Winter Soldier Investigation
