= American Servicemen's Union =

Unofficial US armed-service-persons union

The American Servicemen's Union (ASU), an unofficial union for the U.S. military, was formed by Andy Stapp in 1967 in opposition to the Vietnam War.

The group published an underground newspaper called Fed Up from Fort Lewis.
