= Workers World Party =

Communist party in the United States

- Abbreviation: WWP
- First Secretary: Larry Holmes
- Founder: Sam Marcy
- Founded: 1959; 67 years ago
- Split from: Socialist Workers Party
- Headquarters: 121 W. 27th St. Suite 404. New York City, New York 10001
- Newspaper: Workers World
- Ideology: Communism; Marxism–Leninism; Marcyism
- Political position: Far-left
- Colors: Red

Website
- workers.org

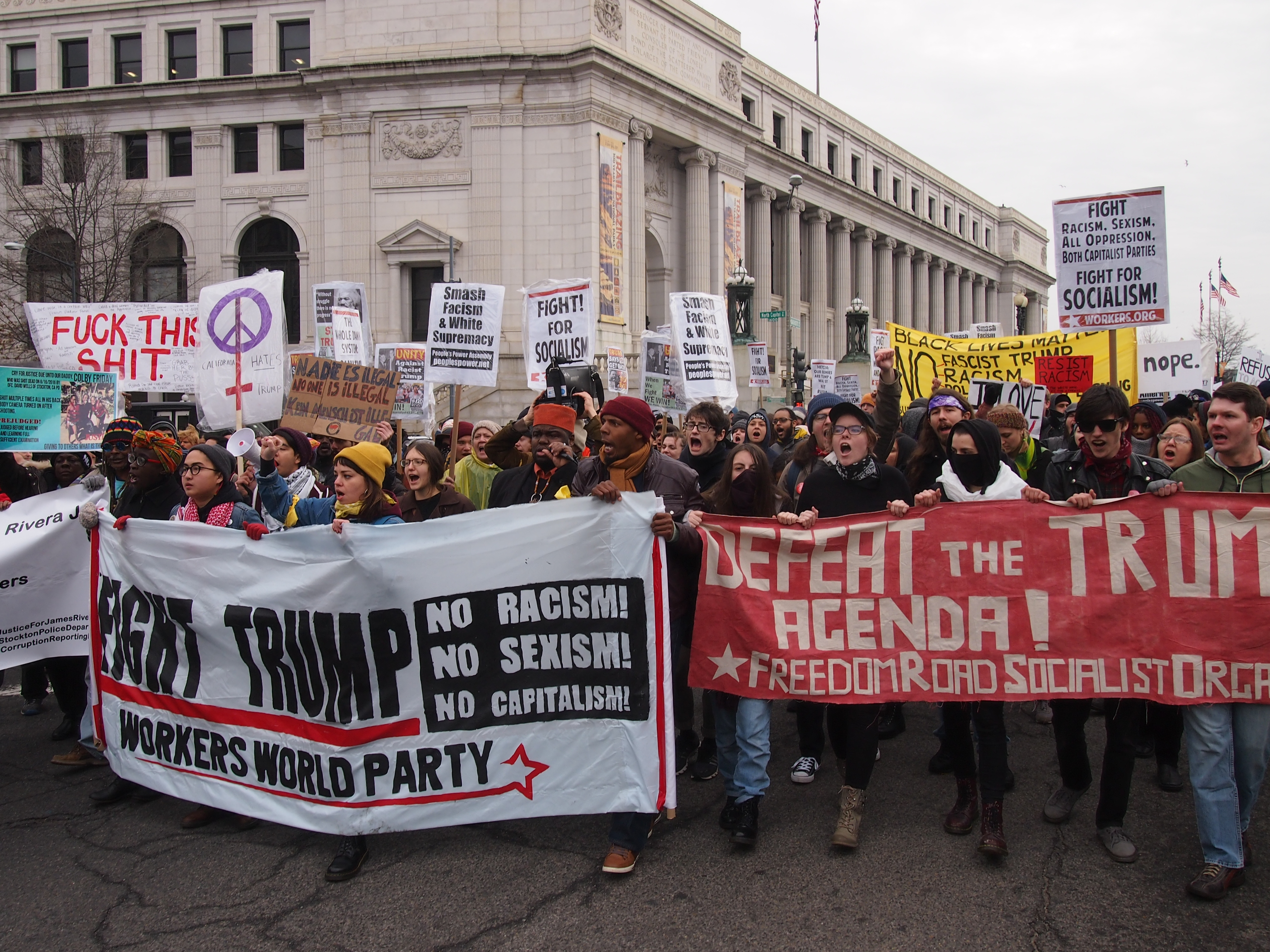
WWP and FRSO protesters at Disrupt J20

The Workers World Party (WWP) is a Marxist–Leninist communist party in the United States founded in 1959 by a group led by Sam Marcy. WWP members are sometimes called Marcyites. Marcy and his followers split from the Socialist Workers Party (SWP) in 1958 over a series of long-standing differences, among them their support for Henry A. Wallace's Progressive Party in 1948, their view of the People's Republic of China as a workers' state, and their defense of the 1956 Soviet intervention in Hungary, some of which the SWP opposed.

== History ==
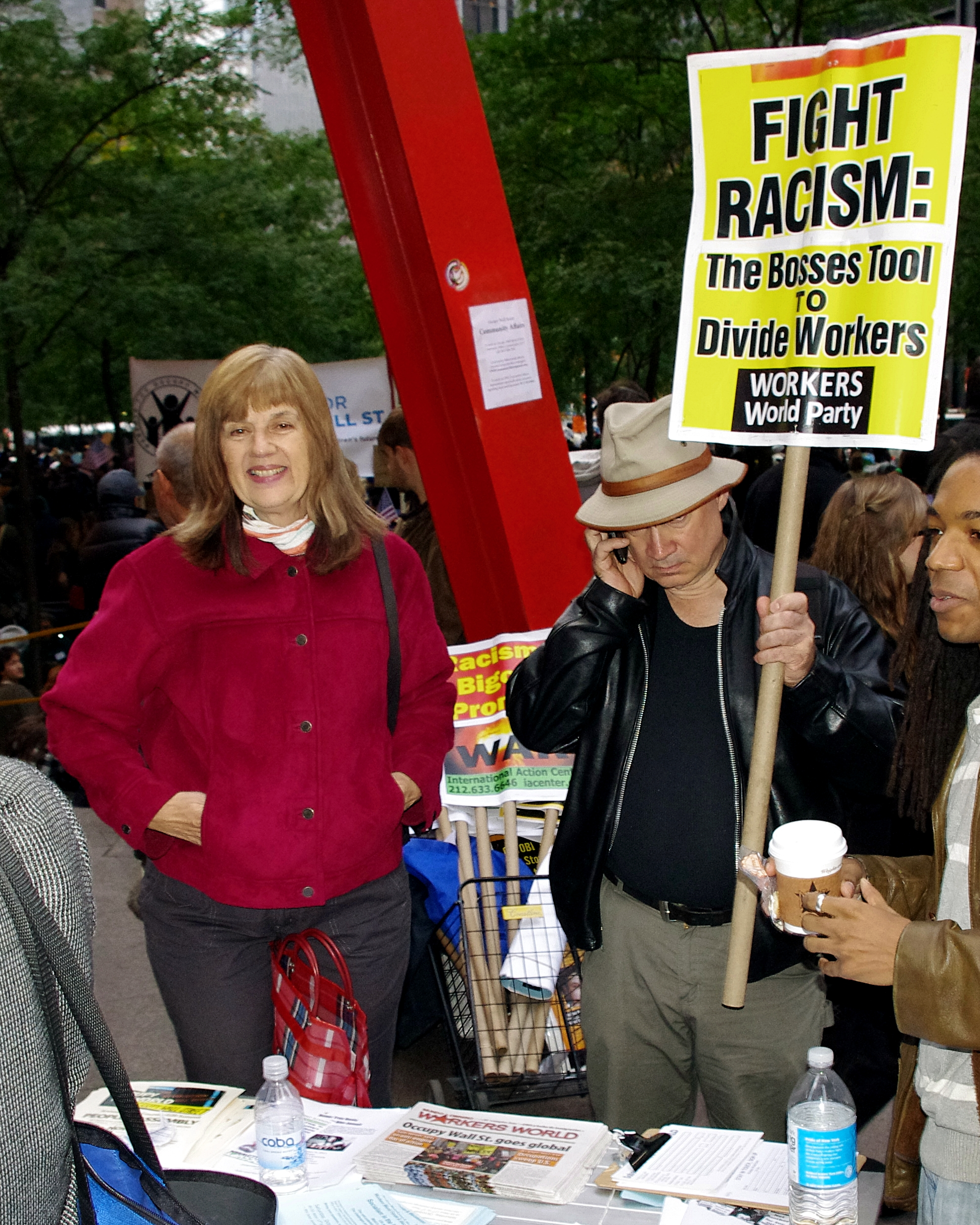
Members staffing a WWP information booth at Occupy Wall Street, October 2011

The WWP had its origins in the Global Class War Tendency, led by Sam Marcy and Vincent Copeland, within the SWP. This group crystallized during the 1948 presidential election when they urged the SWP to back Henry Wallace's Progressive Party campaign, rather than field their own candidates. Throughout the 1950s, the Global Class War Tendency expressed positions at odds with official SWP policy, categorizing the Korean War as a class, rather than imperialist, conflict; support of the People's Republic of China as a workers' state, if not necessarily supporting the Mao Zedong leadership; and supporting the suppression of the Hungarian Revolution by the Soviet Union in 1956.

The Global Class War Tendency left the SWP in early 1959. Although they would later abandon Trotskyism, in their International Workers' Day issue (no. 3) of their new periodical, the group proclaimed: "We are THE Trotskyists. We stand 100% with all the principled positions of Leon Trotsky, the most revolutionary communist since Lenin". The nascent group appears to have organized as the Workers World Party by February 1960. At its inception, the WWP was concentrated among the working class in Buffalo, Youngstown, Seattle and New York. A youth organization, first known as the Anti-Fascist Youth Committee and later as Youth Against War and Fascism (YAWF), was created in April 1962. Gerry Gross was one of the chairman of the committee.

The WWP began publishing the monthly Workers World newspaper in 1959; it was published weekly since 1974.

From the beginning, the WWP and YAWF concentrated their energies on street demonstrations. Early campaigns focused on support of Patrice Lumumba, opposition to the House Un-American Activities Committee and against racial discrimination in housing. They conducted the first protest against American involvement in Vietnam on August 2, 1962. Their opposition to the war also included the tactics of "draft resistance" and "GI resistance". After organizing demonstrations at Fort Sill, Oklahoma in support of a soldier being tried for possessing anti-war literature, they founded the American Servicemen's Union, intended to be a mass organization of American soldiers. However, the group was completely dominated by the WWP and YAWF.

During the late 1960s and 1970s, the party was involved in protests over causes including "defen[se] of the heroic black uprisings in Watts, Newark, Detroit, Harlem" and women's liberation. During the Attica Prison riot, the rioters requested YAWF member Tom Soto to present their grievances for them. The WWP was most successful in organizing demonstrations in support of desegregation "busing" in the Boston schools in 1975. Nearly 30,000 people attended the Boston March Against Racism which they had organized. During the 1970s, they also attempted to begin work inside organized labor, but apparently were not very successful.

In 1980, the WWP began to participate in electoral politics, naming a presidential ticket as well as candidates for New York Senate, congressional and state legislature seats. In California, they ran their candidate Deirdre Griswold in the primary for the Peace and Freedom Party nomination. They came in last, with 1,232 votes out of 9,092. In 1984, the WWP supported Jesse Jackson's bid for the Democratic nomination, but when he lost in the primaries they nominated their own presidential ticket, along with a handful of congressional and legislative nominees.

=== Splits ===
In 1968, the WWP absorbed a small faction of the Spartacist League that had worked with it in the Coalition for an Anti-Imperialist Movement called the Revolutionary Communist League (Internationalist). This group left the WWP in 1971 as the New York Revolutionary Committee. The NYRC's newspaper provided rare details about the internal functioning of the group that have subsequently been used by scholars as a primary source. The NYRC later reconstituted as the Revolutionary Communist League (Internationalist).

In 2004, the WWP suffered its most serious split when the San Francisco branch and some other members left to form the Party for Socialism and Liberation.

In July 2018, the WWP experienced another schism in which several branches including the Detroit branch, one of its oldest, resigned from the organization to form the Communist Workers League.

=== Associated organizations ===
The WWP has organized, directed or participated in many coalition organizations for various causes, typically anti-imperialist in nature.

The International Action Center, which counts many WWP members as leading activists, founded the Act Now to Stop War and End Racism (ANSWER) coalition shortly after the September 11 attacks in 2001 and has run the All People's Congress (APC). The APC and the IAC in particular share a large degree of overlap in their memberships with cadre in the WWP.

In 2004, a youth group close to the WWP called Fight Imperialism Stand Together (FIST) was founded. The group's website was live as of 2024, but the latest newsletter available at that time was dated October 4, 2010, and the home page advertised a "forthcoming" event on 3 December 2011.

== Ideology ==
The WWP describes itself as a party that has since its founding "supported the struggles of all oppressed peoples". It has recognized the right of nations to self-determination, including the nationally oppressed peoples inside the United States. It supports affirmative action as necessary in the fight for equality and it opposes all forms of racism and religious bigotry.

The WWP and its affiliate Youth Against War and Fascism (YAWF) were known for their consistent defense of the Black Panthers, the Weather Underground, the Vietnam Veterans Against the War and the Puerto Rican Independence movement.

== Geopolitical views ==
The Workers World Party has openly supported communist regimes since its founding, including the 1956 Soviet incursion into Hungary and the 1989 Chinese government's actions at Tiananmen Square. The party has also supported some non-communist leaders such as Saddam Hussein of Iraq, Serbian and Yugoslavian politician Slobodan Milosevic, Russian Leader Vladimir Putin, and Syrian dictator Bashar al-Assad. The party is critical of United States foreign policy and seeks to end United States imperialism.

=== North Korea ===
The WWP has maintained a position of supporting the government of North Korea. Through its Vietnam-era front organization, the American Servicemen's Union (ASU), the party endorsed a 1971 statement of support for that government. The statement was read on North Korea's international radio station by visiting ASU delegate Andy Stapp. In 1994, Sam Marcy sent a letter to Kim Jong Il expressing his condolences on behalf of the WWP on the death of his father Kim Il Sung, calling him a great leader and comrade in the international communist movement. Its later front groups, IAC and formerly International A.N.S.W.E.R., have also demonstrated in support of North Korea.

=== Iran ===
In March 2026, Workers World members attended a vigil for Ayatollah Khamenei as well as "the martyrs that have been killed by the U.S.-Israeli attack" which was a reference to the United States and Israeli strikes on Iran during the 2026 Iran War. On March 15th 2026, Workers World Party members also attended an Al-Quds Day rally which Al-Quds Day an annual event held on the last Friday of Ramadan to show support for the Iranian regime and established by Ruhollah Khomeini in 1979.

=== Iraq ===
When the WWP was playing a role in organizing anti-war protests before the invasion of Iraq in 2003, many newspapers and TV shows attacked the WWP for supporting Iraqi president Saddam Hussein.

=== Belarus ===
The WWP signalized support of Alexander Lukashenko during the Belarusian protests in 2020. They accused the protest movement of being "counterrevolutionary" and supported by the "fascist Maidan movement and the U.S. imperialism", while praising President Lukashenko for maintaining some socialist-oriented politics, "rejection of privatization" and keeping the Soviet state symbols.

=== Venezuela ===
In March 2026, Workers World Party members held a rally in support of Nicholas Maduro. Maduro was arrested by the Trump Administration on drug trafficking charges.

=== Israel ===
In 1969, the Anti-Defamation League reported that Youth Against War and Fascism, the youth wing of the WWP, was among several American activist organizations providing political and financial support to the Palestinian group Fatah. The WWP maintains an anti-Zionist platform and opposes the state of Israel, organizing coalitions such as A.N.S.W.E.R. that advocate for a full Palestinian right of return. In July 2026, WWP representatives participated in an Anti-War Action Network conference in Chicago focused on anti-imperialism and boycott efforts targeting Israel.

== Domestic policy ==
The Workers World Party, supports reparations for the American slave trade, a universal basic income, and the abolition of prisons and an end to capitalism. The party has also been active in environmental and indigenous rights protests as well as taking stances for the abolition of ICE, defunding the police, and protesting alongside Black Lives Matter. The group has also supported radical activist groups like the Black Panthers and the Weather Underground.

=== Standing Rock Dakota Access pipeline protests ===
Workers World Party members were present during the Standing Rock Dakota Access Pipeline protests of 2016 and 2017. Where party members "stood in solidarity with the Native and Indigenous struggle" and compared the fight at Standing Rock to support for the Palestinian Cause.

=== Black Lives Matter protests ===
In August 2017 Workers World Party members were accused of destroying a Confederate statue in Durham, North Carolina. Members noted in a statement that "Charlottesville and racist monuments across the country are the result of centuries of white supremacy."

== Election results ==
The WWP has participated in presidential election campaigns since the 1980 election, though its effectiveness in this area is limited as it has been unable to get on the ballots of many states. The party also has run some campaigns for other offices. One of the most successful was in 1990, when Susan Farquhar got on the ballot as a Senate candidate in Michigan and received 1.3% of the vote. However, the party's best result was in the 1992 Ohio Senate election, when the WWP candidate received 6.7% of the vote, running against a Democrat and a Republican.

=== Presidential elections ===
In 2008, the WWP endorsed Cynthia McKinney of the Green Party of the United States.

Year	Presidential candidate	Vice presidential candidate	Popular votes	%	Electoral votes	Result	Ballot access	Notes	Ref
2016	Monica Moorehead	Lamont Lilly	4,173	0.00%	0	Lost	142 / 538		
2004	John Parker	Teresa Gutierrez	1,646	0.00%	0	Lost	93 / 538	(Note: 2004: Vote total includes 265 votes on the Liberty Union Party line in Vermont.)	
2000	Monica Moorehead	Gloria La Riva	4,795	0.00%	0	Lost	51 / 538		
1996	Monica Moorehead	Gloria La Riva	29,083	0.03%	0	Lost	153 / 538		
1992	Gloria La Riva	Larry Holmes	181	0.00%	0	Lost	5 / 538		
1988	Larry Holmes	Gloria La Riva	7,846	0.01%	0	Lost	157 / 538		
1984	Larry Holmes (Note: In 1984, Gavrielle Holmes ran in place of Larry Holmes in some states.)	Gloria La Riva	17,983	0.02%	0	Lost	130 / 538		
1980	Deirdre Griswold	Gavrielle Holmes	13,213	0.01%	0	Lost	117 / 538		

== Notable members ==
- Vince Copeland, actor
- Leslie Feinberg, author
- Sara Flounders, activist
- Sam Marcy, author

== See also ==
- Revolutionary Communist Party, USA
- American Left
- History of the socialist movement in the United States
- Democratic Socialists of America
- Communist Party USA
- Socialist Alternative (United States)

== Sources ==
- House of Representatives Committee on Internal Security (1974). The Workers World Party and Its Front Organizations. Washington: United States Congress.
- Alexander, Robert (1991). International Trotskyism: a documented analysis of the world movement. Durham: Duke University Press.
- Alexander, Robert (1973). "Schisms and unifications in the American Old Left 1953–1970". Labor History. 14 (Fall 1973).
