= Workers World (newspaper) =

American communist publication

Workers World is the official newspaper of the Workers' World Party (WWP), a communist party in the United States. Sam Marcy led a faction out of the Socialist Workers Party and founded WWP in 1959; the first issue of Workers World was published in New York City in March of that year.

== Content ==
Workers World featured the writings of Sam Marcy and Workers World Party co-founder Vincent Copeland (who was the paper's first editor) — among many others — until Copeland's passing in 1993 and subsequently Marcy's death in 1998. The ideological positions of WWP were developed largely through articles in the newspaper, but it has never been strictly devoted to that line. LGBT activists Leslie Feinberg and Minnie Bruce Pratt were managing editors of the newspaper until their deaths in 2014 and 2023 respectively. Workers' struggles, racism and discrimination were, and continue to be, extensively covered in the paper.

== Publication information ==
Workers World has always operated by an all-volunteer staff. While distributed nationally from the beginning, it was a monthly paper until 1974, when it expanded into a weekly. It is published every week except for the first week of the New Year, and currently costs $1. Subscriptions are distributed worldwide, to homes, organizations and prisons; for many years the last page has printed pertinent articles in Spanish as Mundo Obrero. Workers World also publishes nearly all of its articles on the website workers.org, becoming one of the first communist newspapers to take advantage of the internet to reach more people.
