= Vincent Copeland =

American actor (1915–1993)

- Born: June 19, 1915
- Died: June 7, 1993 (aged 77); Hoboken, New Jersey, U.S.
- Political party: Workers World Party, Socialist Workers Party
- Movement: Communism

Vincent Copeland (June 19, 1915 – June 7, 1993) was an American actor, labor official, writer, and political activist. A communist, Copeland was an actor during the 1930s but soon turned to political activism. Turning to industrial labor, Copeland was a welder, grievance officer, and editor of his unions' newspaper at the Bethlehem Steel plant in Lackawanna, New York. He "opposed the company's practice of denying black furnace workers better jobs by hiring outsiders to fill them" and 16,000 workers walked off the job in a wildcat strike. Copeland, however, was not rehired.

A member of the Trotskyist Socialist Workers Party (SWP), Copeland, Sam Marcy and others formed a faction which eventually left the party in 1958. A year later, Copeland became a founding member of Workers World Party (WWP). He was the founding editor of the party's newspaper, the eponymously named Workers World.

During the 1960s, he was a board member of National Mobilization Committee to End the War in Vietnam, a major coordinating organization for mass protests against United States involvement in the Vietnam War. Copeland was a long-time resident of Jersey City, New Jersey, where he edited the Community Voice newspaper from 1985–1988.

Copeland married fellow communist Elizabeth 'Libby' Ross in 1940. Ross died in 1989. He had two step-children, one of whom, Deirdre Griswold, was Workers World's nominee for president in 1980. He died on June 7, 1993, at his home in Hoboken, New Jersey.
