= Deirdre Griswold =

American politician

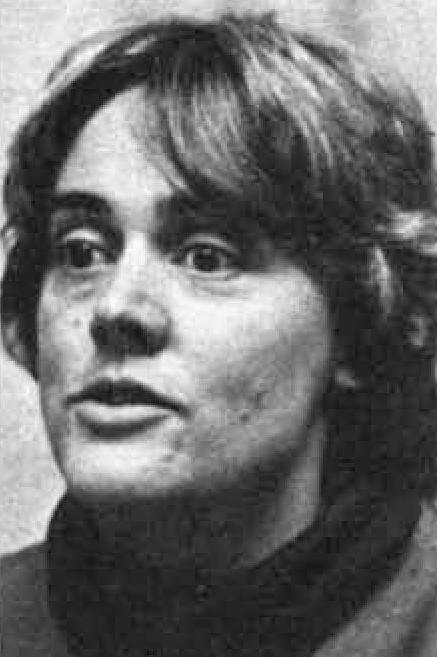
- Griswold in 1980
- Occupations: Politician; activist
- Political party: Workers World
- Spouse: Andy Stapp
- Parent(s): Vincent Copeland; Elizabeth Ross Copeland

Deirdre Griswold (born 1937) is an American communist political activist. She is the editor of Workers World, the newspaper of the Workers World Party.

She is the daughter of Vincent Copeland, one of the founders of the party. Her mother, Elizabeth Ross Copeland, and paternal aunt, Cynthia Cochran, were also communists. She was married to Andy Stapp.

In 1964 she served as Executive Director of Mark Lane's Citizens Committee of Inquiry. Griswold maintained and answered much of committee's communications with its volunteers.

She has edited communist publication Workers World for several decades.

On February 12, 2018, Griswold appeared on Tucker Carlson Tonight, where she defended the government of North Korea.

== Bibliography ==
- China; the struggle within from the pages of Workers World (1972) (with Sam Marcy and Naomi Cohen)
- The Ethiopian Revolution and the Struggle Against U.S. Imperialism (1978)
- Eyewitness Ethiopia: The continuing revolution (1979)
- Indonesia: The Bloodbath that Was (1975)
- Indonesia: The Second Greatest Crime of the Century (1978) ISBN 0-89567-003-8
