= 1980 United States presidential election in Mississippi =

- November 4, 1980

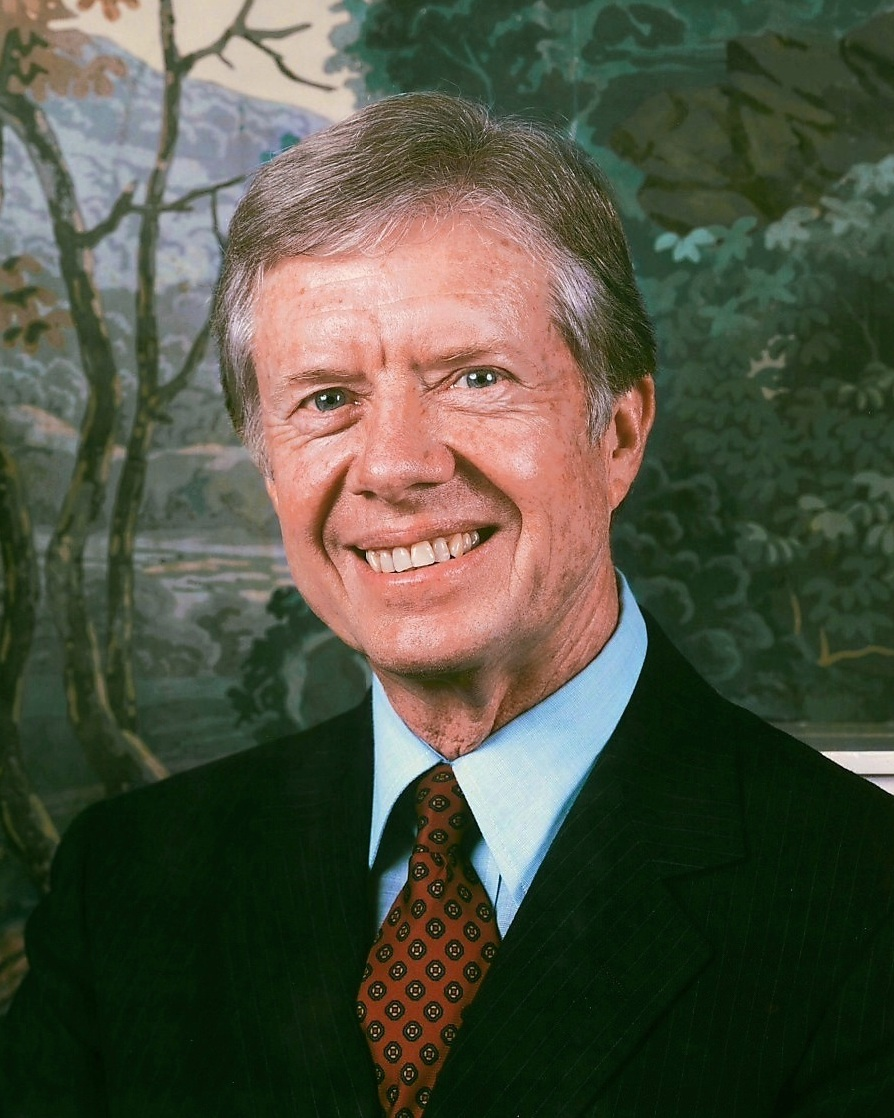
Nominee	Ronald Reagan	Jimmy Carter
Party	Republican	Democratic
Home state	California	Georgia
Running mate	George H. W. Bush	Walter Mondale
Electoral vote	7	0
Popular vote	441,089	429,281
Percentage	49.42%	48.09%

Reagan
40–50%
50–60%
60–70%
Carter
40–50%
50–60%
60–70%
70–80%
Tie
40–50%
President before election
Jimmy Carter
Democratic
Elected President
Ronald Reagan
Republican

The 1980 United States presidential election in Mississippi took place on November 4, 1980. All fifty states and The District of Columbia were part of the 1980 United States presidential election. Mississippi voters chose seven electors to the Electoral College, who voted for president and vice president.

Mississippi was won, fairly consistently with predictions, by Reagan with a slim margin of 1.33 points. However, in future elections, the state would become a Republican stronghold, and no Democratic presidential candidate has carried the state since Jimmy Carter in the prior election. As of the 2024 presidential election, this is the last election in which Winston County, Tippah County, Itawamba County, Union County, Prentiss County, Pontotoc County, Lee County, Lafayette County, Attala County, Monroe County, Madison County, Calhoun County, Tate County, Marion County, Leake County, Grenada County, and Franklin County voted for the Democratic candidate, as well as the last time that Clarke County was not carried by the Republican candidate; as Reagan and Carter ended up in a tie in Clarke County.

This is the last presidential election in which Mississippi voted more Democratic than the nation at large. At the time it was the election with the largest number of votes in Mississippi history. This is the second-closest election in Mississippi after 1848 and the only time that a Republican has won Mississippi by a margin of less than 5 points. This was also the seventh election in a row in which Mississippi voted for a different party than the previous election.

== Campaign ==
Both major party candidates targeted the state, with Governor William F. Winter giving incumbent president and Democratic candidate Jimmy Carter extensive support — support that had not been given to a Democratic nominee since Adlai Stevenson II during the 1950s. Mississippi, alongside Alabama, Florida and Texas, was a key state in Reagan's plan to win the presidency by eating into Carter's 1976 Southern support, especially as Carter's Baptist identity held less weight than it had in 1976.

Philadelphia, notorious for the 1964 murder of three civil rights workers, was where Reagan began his campaign with a proclamation of “states’ rights” frequently compared with George Wallace’s 1968 campaign, which had won over five-eighths of Mississippi’s total vote and over four-fifths of the white vote. Late in September, the state would be the target of simultaneous campaigning by Jimmy Carter’s mother Lilian, and simultaneously by Republican nominee, former California Governor Ronald Reagan. Later in the campaign, however, Governor Winter issued a severe criticism of Reagan’s campaign for failing to debate agricultural policy.

Among white voters, 62% supported Reagan while 35% supported Carter.

=== Predictions ===
Source	Rating	As of
Bristol Herald Courier	Lean R (Flip)	October 5, 1980
Kansas City Star	Lean R (Flip)	October 12, 1980
The Clarion-Ledger	Lean R (Flip)	October 26, 1980
The Greenwood Commonwealth	Lean R (Flip)	October 31, 1980
Fort Worth Star-Telegram	Tilt R (Flip)	October 31, 1980
Daily Press	Tossup	November 3, 1980

== Results ==
1980 United States presidential election in Mississippi
Party	Candidate	Votes	Percentage	Electoral votes
Republican	Ronald Reagan	441,089	49.42%	7
Democrat	Jimmy Carter (incumbent)	429,281	48.09%	0
Independent	John B. Anderson	12,036	1.35%	0
Independent	Edward Clark	5,465	0.61%	0
Independent	Deirdre Griswold	2,402	0.27%	0
Independent	Andrew Pulley	2,347	0.26%	0
Totals		892,620	100.00%	7

=== Results by county ===
County	Ronald Reagan Republican		Jimmy Carter Democratic		John B. Anderson Independent		Ed Clark Independent		Deidre Griswold Independent		Andrew Pulley Independent		Margin		Total
County	#	%	#	%	#	%	#	%	#	%	#	%	#	%	Total
Adams	7,523	48.97%	7,228	47.05%	151	0.98%	245	1.59%	166	1.08%	50	0.33%	295	1.92%	15,363
Alcorn	5,196	41.25%	6,242	49.56%	898	7.13%	119	0.94%	37	0.29%	103	0.82%	-1,046	-8.31%	12,595
Amite	2,653	44.43%	3,229	54.08%	43	0.72%	24	0.40%	11	0.18%	11	0.18%	-576	-9.65%	5,971
Attala	3,975	48.39%	4,117	50.12%	71	0.86%	27	0.33%	13	0.16%	11	0.13%	-142	-1.73%	8,214
Benton	1,254	36.59%	2,094	61.10%	35	1.02%	20	0.58%	13	0.38%	11	0.32%	-840	-24.51%	3,427
Bolivar	5,148	35.53%	8,839	61.00%	280	1.93%	110	0.76%	37	0.26%	77	0.53%	-3,691	-25.47%	14,491
Calhoun	2,579	42.85%	3,295	54.74%	64	1.06%	44	0.73%	21	0.35%	16	0.27%	-716	-11.89%	6,019
Carroll	2,153	50.92%	2,037	48.18%	22	0.52%	11	0.26%	3	0.07%	2	0.05%	116	2.74%	4,228
Chickasaw	2,540	40.13%	3,622	57.23%	71	1.12%	47	0.74%	28	0.44%	21	0.33%	-1,082	-17.10%	6,329
Choctaw	1,927	52.15%	1,729	46.79%	26	0.70%	10	0.27%	2	0.05%	1	0.03%	198	5.36%	3,695
Claiborne	1,129	26.70%	3,032	71.71%	22	0.52%	22	0.52%	16	0.38%	7	0.17%	-1,903	-45.01%	4,228
Clarke	3,303	49.14%	3,303	49.14%	41	0.61%	48	0.71%	17	0.25%	9	0.13%	0	0.00%	6,721
Clay	3,439	43.18%	4,275	53.68%	124	1.56%	55	0.69%	39	0.49%	32	0.40%	-836	-10.50%	7,964
Coahoma	4,592	38.22%	7,030	58.51%	256	2.13%	62	0.52%	38	0.32%	37	0.31%	-2,438	-20.29%	12,015
Copiah	4,461	43.99%	5,517	54.41%	76	0.75%	45	0.44%	21	0.21%	20	0.20%	-1,056	-10.42%	10,140
Covington	3,471	53.15%	2,956	45.26%	39	0.60%	28	0.43%	20	0.31%	17	0.26%	515	7.89%	6,531
DeSoto	9,655	58.80%	6,344	38.64%	237	1.44%	103	0.63%	41	0.25%	39	0.24%	3,311	20.16%	16,419
Forrest	12,656	59.34%	8,274	38.80%	275	1.29%	95	0.45%	17	0.08%	10	0.05%	4,382	20.54%	21,327
Franklin	2,026	49.31%	2,040	49.65%	23	0.56%	9	0.22%	4	0.10%	7	0.17%	-14	-0.34%	4,109
George	3,052	51.45%	2,757	46.48%	64	1.08%	31	0.52%	8	0.13%	20	0.34%	295	4.97%	5,932
Greene	1,772	50.04%	1,740	49.14%	23	0.65%	5	0.14%	1	0.03%	0	0.00%	32	0.90%	3,541
Grenada	3,993	48.11%	4,182	50.39%	59	0.71%	38	0.46%	14	0.17%	14	0.17%	-189	-2.28%	8,300
Hancock	5,088	57.07%	3,544	39.75%	159	1.78%	91	1.02%	18	0.20%	15	0.17%	1,544	17.32%	8,915
Harrison	25,175	58.70%	16,318	38.05%	822	1.92%	371	0.87%	81	0.19%	121	0.28%	8,857	20.65%	42,888
Hinds	48,135	53.44%	39,369	43.71%	1,414	1.57%	623	0.69%	294	0.33%	239	0.27%	8,766	9.73%	90,074
Holmes	2,693	32.31%	5,463	65.54%	57	0.68%	54	0.65%	39	0.47%	30	0.36%	-2,770	-33.23%	8,336
Humphreys	1,841	36.67%	2,970	59.16%	68	1.35%	74	1.47%	37	0.74%	30	0.60%	-1,129	-22.49%	5,020
Issaquena	349	36.05%	598	61.78%	5	0.52%	6	0.62%	5	0.52%	5	0.52%	-249	-25.73%	968
Itawamba	2,906	37.00%	4,852	61.79%	57	0.73%	26	0.33%	7	0.09%	5	0.06%	-1,946	-24.79%	7,853
Jackson	22,498	62.57%	12,226	34.00%	653	1.82%	394	1.09%	100	0.28%	127	0.35%	10,272	28.57%	35,958
Jasper	2,781	41.68%	3,813	57.14%	34	0.51%	23	0.34%	14	0.21%	8	0.12%	-1,032	-15.46%	6,673
Jefferson	751	20.17%	2,871	77.09%	41	1.10%	28	0.75%	15	0.40%	18	0.48%	-2,120	-56.92%	3,724
Jefferson Davis	2,280	36.85%	3,831	61.92%	24	0.39%	26	0.42%	19	0.31%	7	0.11%	-1,551	-25.07%	6,187
Jones	12,900	53.11%	11,117	45.77%	155	0.64%	60	0.25%	24	0.10%	33	0.14%	1,783	7.34%	24,289
Kemper	1,822	41.05%	2,601	58.59%	12	0.27%	4	0.09%	0	0.00%	0	0.00%	-779	-17.54%	4,439
Lafayette	4,366	45.62%	4,887	51.06%	243	2.54%	42	0.44%	19	0.20%	14	0.15%	-521	-5.44%	9,571
Lamar	5,395	63.13%	3,005	35.16%	84	0.98%	39	0.46%	13	0.15%	10	0.12%	2,390	27.97%	8,546
Lauderdale	14,727	56.38%	9,918	37.97%	784	3.00%	438	1.68%	71	0.27%	181	0.69%	4,809	18.41%	26,119
Lawrence	2,781	50.02%	2,692	48.42%	49	0.88%	22	0.40%	5	0.09%	11	0.20%	89	1.60%	5,560
Leake	3,624	46.83%	4,033	52.12%	40	0.52%	14	0.18%	15	0.19%	12	0.16%	-409	-5.29%	7,738
Lee	8,326	44.08%	10,047	53.19%	321	1.70%	100	0.53%	37	0.20%	58	0.31%	-1,721	-9.11%	18,889
Leflore	5,798	42.40%	7,498	54.83%	166	1.21%	83	0.61%	71	0.52%	59	0.43%	-1,700	-12.43%	13,675
Lincoln	7,286	57.78%	5,213	41.34%	75	0.59%	19	0.15%	7	0.06%	10	0.08%	2,073	16.44%	12,610
Lowndes	9,973	60.98%	6,187	37.83%	140	0.86%	45	0.28%	7	0.04%	3	0.02%	3,786	23.15%	16,355
Madison	6,024	42.91%	7,621	54.28%	276	1.97%	61	0.43%	16	0.11%	41	0.29%	-1,597	-11.37%	14,039
Marion	5,218	48.73%	5,366	50.12%	62	0.58%	36	0.34%	12	0.11%	3	0.03%	-148	-1.39%	10,707
Marshall	3,455	31.85%	7,153	65.94%	121	1.12%	63	0.58%	22	0.20%	24	0.22%	-3,698	-34.09%	10,848
Monroe	4,793	39.16%	6,998	57.18%	177	1.45%	143	1.17%	55	0.45%	73	0.60%	-2,205	-18.02%	12,239
Montgomery	2,479	46.55%	2,730	51.26%	42	0.79%	28	0.53%	20	0.38%	27	0.51%	-251	-4.71%	5,326
Neshoba	5,165	56.45%	3,872	42.32%	72	0.79%	19	0.21%	12	0.13%	9	0.10%	1,293	14.13%	9,149
Newton	4,317	54.36%	3,455	43.51%	86	1.08%	33	0.42%	36	0.45%	14	0.18%	862	10.85%	7,941
Noxubee	1,970	35.46%	3,434	61.82%	47	0.85%	41	0.74%	41	0.74%	22	0.40%	-1,464	-26.36%	5,555
Oktibbeha	6,300	49.70%	6,039	47.64%	258	2.04%	54	0.43%	15	0.12%	9	0.07%	261	2.06%	12,675
Panola	4,219	39.33%	6,179	57.60%	149	1.39%	90	0.84%	47	0.44%	44	0.41%	-1,960	-18.27%	10,728
Pearl River	6,822	56.19%	5,028	41.41%	161	1.33%	77	0.63%	25	0.21%	28	0.23%	1,794	14.78%	12,141
Perry	2,255	52.90%	1,957	45.91%	25	0.59%	14	0.33%	8	0.19%	4	0.09%	298	6.99%	4,263
Pike	6,661	48.56%	6,694	48.80%	129	0.94%	115	0.84%	57	0.42%	60	0.44%	-33	-0.24%	13,716
Pontotoc	3,198	40.99%	4,499	57.66%	58	0.74%	33	0.42%	7	0.09%	7	0.09%	-1,301	-16.67%	7,802
Prentiss	3,264	39.91%	4,832	59.09%	40	0.49%	29	0.35%	5	0.06%	8	0.10%	-1,568	-19.18%	8,178
Quitman	1,691	35.16%	2,926	60.83%	83	1.73%	34	0.71%	32	0.67%	44	0.91%	-1,235	-25.67%	4,810
Rankin	16,650	66.25%	8,047	32.02%	296	1.18%	81	0.32%	29	0.12%	29	0.12%	8,603	34.23%	25,132
Scott	4,645	52.59%	4,043	45.78%	72	0.82%	32	0.36%	16	0.18%	24	0.27%	602	6.81%	8,832
Sharkey	996	32.97%	1,957	64.78%	28	0.93%	21	0.70%	11	0.36%	8	0.26%	-961	-31.81%	3,021
Simpson	5,190	55.60%	4,015	43.01%	70	0.75%	23	0.25%	29	0.31%	7	0.07%	1,175	12.59%	9,334
Smith	3,772	59.50%	2,474	39.02%	46	0.73%	27	0.43%	8	0.13%	13	0.21%	1,298	20.48%	6,340
Stone	1,888	49.21%	1,821	47.46%	53	1.38%	50	1.30%	15	0.39%	10	0.26%	67	1.75%	3,837
Sunflower	3,728	41.76%	5,035	56.40%	82	0.92%	40	0.45%	26	0.29%	16	0.18%	-1,307	-14.64%	8,927
Tallahatchie	2,183	37.79%	3,467	60.02%	45	0.78%	24	0.42%	37	0.64%	20	0.35%	-1,284	-22.23%	5,776
Tate	3,343	45.38%	3,892	52.84%	80	1.09%	28	0.38%	16	0.22%	7	0.10%	-549	-7.46%	7,366
Tippah	3,338	44.97%	3,878	52.24%	116	1.56%	53	0.71%	23	0.31%	15	0.20%	-540	-7.27%	7,423
Tishomingo	2,489	34.47%	4,595	63.63%	79	1.09%	29	0.40%	9	0.12%	20	0.28%	-2,106	-29.16%	7,221
Tunica	954	29.77%	2,198	68.58%	24	0.75%	14	0.44%	8	0.25%	7	0.22%	-1,244	-38.81%	3,205
Union	3,545	40.68%	5,001	57.38%	94	1.08%	46	0.53%	19	0.22%	10	0.11%	-1,456	-16.70%	8,715
Walthall	2,703	46.91%	2,960	51.37%	34	0.59%	35	0.61%	12	0.21%	18	0.31%	-257	-4.46%	5,762
Warren	10,151	56.00%	7,489	41.31%	274	1.51%	82	0.45%	77	0.42%	55	0.30%	2,662	14.69%	18,128
Washington	8,978	44.63%	10,722	53.30%	186	0.92%	89	0.44%	89	0.44%	53	0.26%	-1,744	-8.67%	20,117
Wayne	3,844	52.07%	3,494	47.32%	26	0.35%	17	0.23%	2	0.03%	0	0.00%	350	4.75%	7,383
Webster	2,386	50.64%	2,178	46.22%	75	1.59%	39	0.83%	19	0.40%	15	0.32%	208	4.42%	4,712
Wilkinson	1,442	32.04%	2,981	66.24%	25	0.56%	22	0.49%	14	0.31%	16	0.36%	-1,539	-34.20%	4,500
Winston	3,998	46.79%	4,416	51.68%	65	0.76%	29	0.34%	19	0.22%	18	0.21%	-418	-4.89%	8,545
Yalobusha	2,224	38.46%	3,432	59.35%	78	1.35%	25	0.43%	12	0.21%	12	0.21%	-1,208	-20.89%	5,783
Yazoo	4,819	45.90%	5,468	52.09%	99	0.94%	49	0.47%	30	0.29%	33	0.31%	-649	-6.19%	10,498
Totals	441,089	49.42%	429,281	48.09%	12,036	1.35%	5,465	0.61%	2,402	0.27%	2,347	0.26%	11,808	1.33%	892,620

== Works cited ==
- Black, Earl; Black, Merle (1992). The Vital South: How Presidents Are Elected. Harvard University Press. ISBN 0674941306.
