= Sam Marcy =

American lawyer (1911–1998)

Chairman of the Workers World Party
- In office 1959 – February 1, 1998

Personal details
- Born: 1911 Russian Empire
- Died: February 1, 1998 (aged 86) New York City, U.S.
- Party: Workers World Party (after 1959)
- Other political affiliations: Communist Party USA (until 1940s); Socialist Workers Party (1940s–1959)
- Spouse: Dorothy Ballan
- Occupation: Political activist; writer

Sam Ballan (1911 – February 1, 1998), known by his pen name Sam Marcy, was an American lawyer, writer, historian, and Trotskyist activist of the post-World War II era. He co-founded the Workers World Party in 1959 and served as its chairperson until his death.

== Biography ==
Marcy was born in the Russian Empire to Jewish parents. During the Russian Civil War, his family was a target of anti-Jewish pogroms by the White movement and received protection from the communist forces. They resettled in Brooklyn, where Marcy became an activist for the Communist Party USA. He studied law at St. Johns University and provided legal advice to labor unions in New York.

Marcy grew discontented as a member of the Communist Party, viewing the Third International as increasingly detached from working class interests and instead a mouthpiece for Joseph Stalin, whose oppressive bureaucracy he despised. He joined the Trotskyist movement in the 1940s, building a branch of the Socialist Workers Party (SWP) in Buffalo. Yet he again became dissatisfied, finding the SWP uncommitted to revolutionary politics and instead oriented toward parliamentary reform. Marcy, Vince Copeland, and other SWP members developed a theory of "global class war", according to which Marxists had a duty to defend the existence of the USSR and its satellites in spite of their bureaucracy. The theory not only guided the formation of the Workers World Party but has more recently made inroads into academic Marxist debates in the U.S. Over several years Marcy clashed with the SWP leadership on several questions, including their approach to Communist China and North Korea, whether the SWP should endorse Henry A. Wallace, and the Hungarian Revolution of 1956. On the last question, Marcy's faction supported the Soviet military intervention, arguing that the initial worker uprising had attracted class elements that sought to restore capitalism.

In 1959 the "global class war" faction set up a new organization, the Workers World Party, characterized by outspoken defense of all Communist governments in the world. Marcy's writings included extensive works on socialism, the Cold War era and the rise of the powerful military-industrial complex. He also wrote about the civil rights struggles of the 1960s, the anti-war movement during the Vietnam War, the economic forces behind capitalist downsizing and the impact of high technology. Selections of his works have been translated into many languages, including Persian, Spanish, Turkish, Korean, French and German.

His writings show a strong support for Mao Zedong and the Chinese Cultural Revolution, and he defended the leadership of the People’s Republic of China until the reforms of Deng Xiaoping. Marcy defended both China and the Soviet Union against charges of imperialism despite disagreeing with some policies and practices of the Communist Party leadership of both countries.

In addition to his writings, Marcy and Copeland were some of the organizers of the first demonstration in the United States against the Vietnam War. The demonstration, by WWP affiliate group Youth Against War and Fascism, occurred in August 1962 and was subsequently noted by Ho Chi Minh in an interview with the National Guardian newspaper. Marcy died at Cabrini Medical Center in Manhattan on February 1, 1998, at age 86.
