= 1980 United States presidential election in Rhode Island =

- November 4, 1980
- Turnout: 79.0% ▲2.6 pp
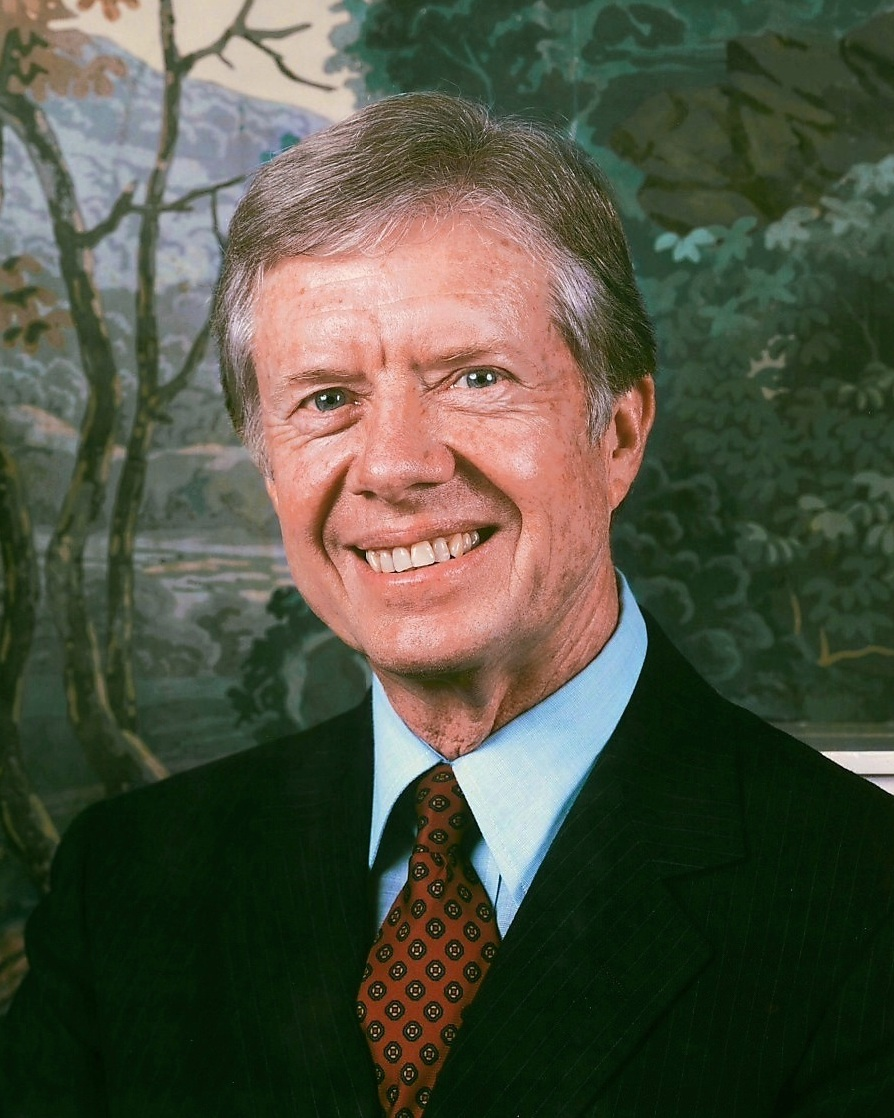

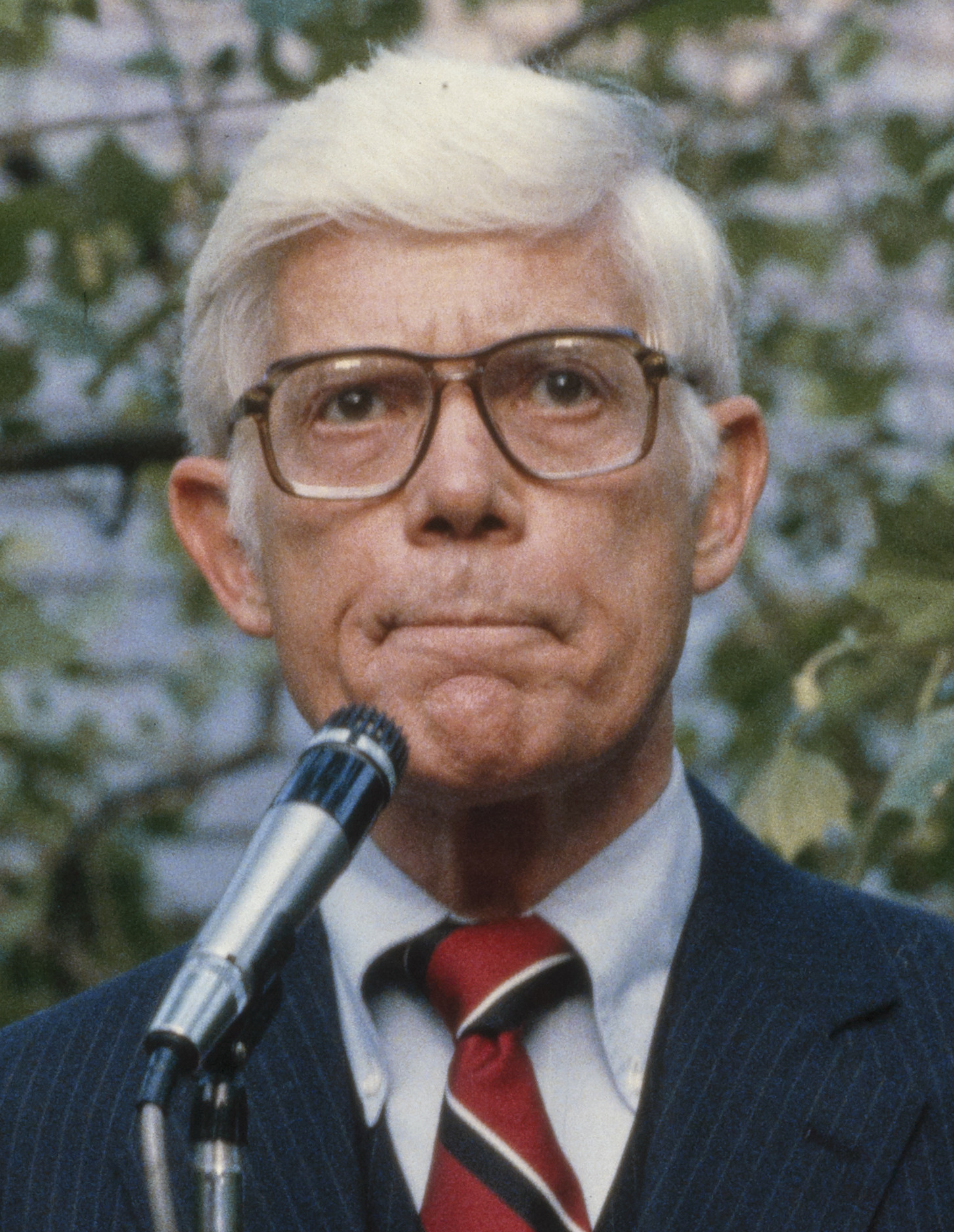
Nominee	Jimmy Carter	Ronald Reagan	John B. Anderson
Party	Democratic	Republican	Anderson for President (Note: Anderson’s party was listed on this state’s ballot as “Anderson for President”.)
Home state	Georgia	California	Illinois
Running mate	Walter Mondale	George H. W. Bush	Patrick Lucey
Electoral vote	4	0	0
Popular vote	198,342	154,793	59,819
Percentage	47.67%	37.20%	14.38%

Carter
30–40%
40–50%
50–60%
Reagan
30–40%
40–50%
50–60%
President before election
Jimmy Carter
Democratic
Elected President
Ronald Reagan
Republican

The 1980 United States presidential election in Rhode Island took place on November 4, 1980, as part of the 1980 United States presidential election. Voters chose four representatives, or electors, to the Electoral College, who voted for president and vice president.

The Democratic Party candidate, incumbent President Jimmy Carter, won the state of Rhode Island over former California Governor Ronald Reagan by 43,549 votes, giving him one of just seven victories in the election (other than Rhode Island, Carter also carried Maryland, Minnesota, Hawaii, West Virginia, the District of Columbia and his home state of Georgia). Rhode Island was the only state in New England that Carter carried in his re-election campaign.

While Carter was able to win Rhode Island by more than 10%, some of his votes were taken away by the strong third party candidacy of John B. Anderson, a liberal Republican Congressman who ran in 1980 as an independent after failing to win the Republican Party's own presidential nomination. Anderson proved very popular with liberal and moderate voters in New England who viewed Reagan as too far to the right and with normally leaning Democratic voters who were dissatisfied with the policies of the Carter Administration. New England would prove to be Anderson's strongest region in the nation, with all six New England states giving double-digit percentages to Anderson. In fact, Rhode Island would ultimately prove to be John Anderson's third strongest state in the nation after neighboring Massachusetts and Vermont, his 14.38% of the vote in the state more than double the 6.61% he got nationwide. As of 2024, this election marks only the third and last time (after 1852 and 1972) that Rhode Island has not voted for the same candidate as neighboring Massachusetts.

== Results ==
1980 United States presidential election in Rhode Island
Party	Candidate	Votes	Percentage	Electoral votes
Democratic	Jimmy Carter (incumbent)	198,342	47.67%	4
Republican	Ronald Reagan	154,793	37.20%	0
Anderson for President	John B. Anderson	59,819	14.38%	0

=== By county ===
County	Jimmy Carter Democratic		Ronald Reagan Republican		Various candidates Other parties		Margin		Total votes cast
County	#	%	#	%	#	%	#	%	Total votes cast
Bristol	9,851	45.08%	8,508	38.93%	3,493	15.99%	1,343	6.15%	21,852
Kent	31,350	44.15%	28,331	39.90%	11,324	15.95%	3,019	4.25%	71,005
Newport	13,904	40.47%	14,555	42.37%	5,897	17.16%	-651	-1.90%	34,356
Providence	126,808	51.15%	86,467	34.88%	34,652	13.97%	40,341	16.27%	247,927
Washington	16,429	40.24%	16,932	41.47%	7,466	18.29%	-503	-1.23%	40,827
Totals	198,342	47.67%	154,793	37.20%	62,937	15.13%	43,549	10.47%	416,072

==== Counties flipped from Democratic to Republican ====
- Newport
- Washington

== See also ==
- United States presidential elections in Rhode Island
