= 1980 United States presidential election in West Virginia =

- November 4, 1980
- Turnout: 71.7% (of registered voters) ▲53.0% (of voting age population) ▼
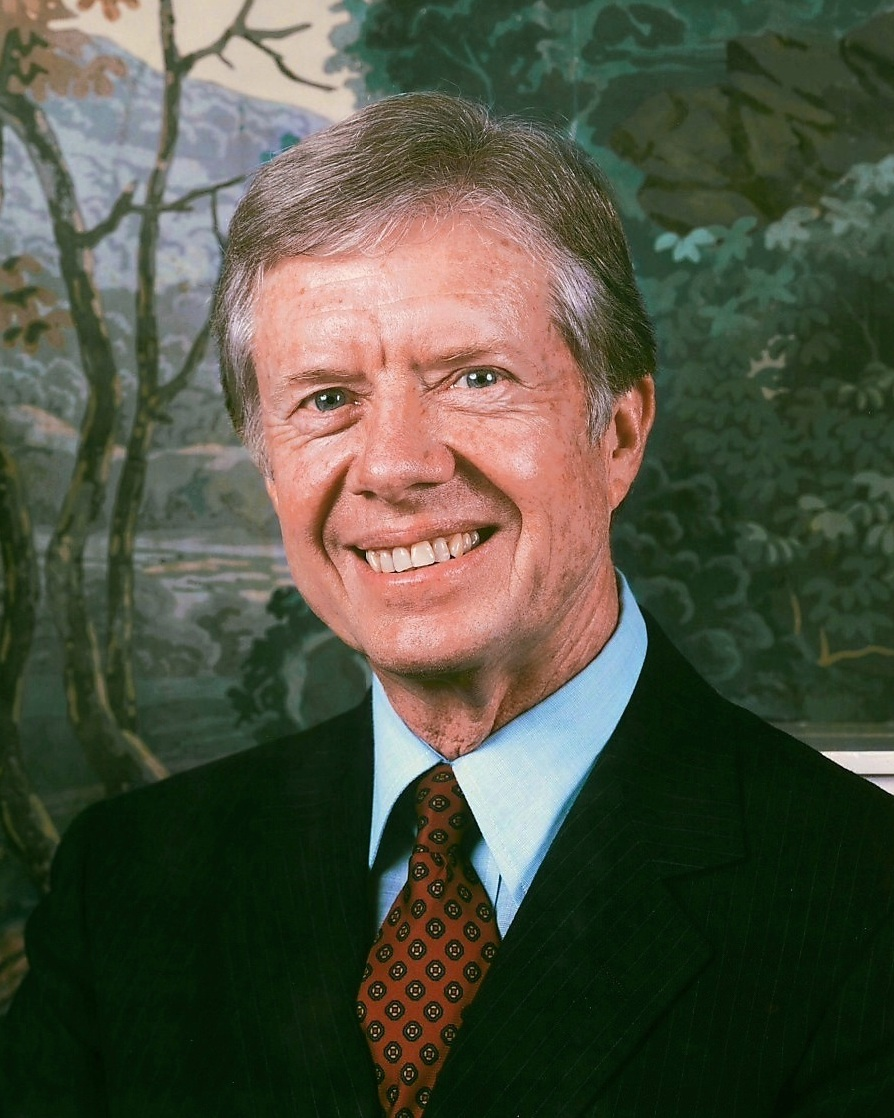

Nominee	Jimmy Carter	Ronald Reagan
Party	Democratic	Republican
Home state	Georgia	California
Running mate	Walter Mondale	George H. W. Bush
Electoral vote	6	0
Popular vote	367,462	334,206
Percentage	49.81%	45.30%
County results
Carter
40–50%
50–60%
60–70%
70–80%
Reagan
40–50%
50–60%
60–70%
70–80%
President before election
Jimmy Carter
Democratic
Elected President
Ronald Reagan
Republican

The 1980 United States presidential election in West Virginia took place on November 4, 1980, in West Virginia as part of the 1980 United States presidential election.

The Democratic Party candidate, incumbent President Jimmy Carter, won the state over former California Governor Ronald Reagan by 33,356 votes, giving him one of just seven victories in the election. West Virginia gave Carter his largest share of the vote in any state outside of his home state of Georgia, but the only other states he carried were Maryland, Minnesota, Hawaii, and Rhode Island.

Nationally, Reagan won the election with 489 electoral votes and 50.75 percent of the popular vote.

== Results ==
1980 United States presidential election in West Virginia
Party	Candidate	Votes	Percentage	Electoral votes
Democratic	Jimmy Carter (incumbent)	367,462	49.81%	6
Republican	Ronald Reagan	334,206	45.30%	0
Independent	John B. Anderson	31,691	4.30%	0
Libertarian	Ed Clark	4,356	0.59%	0

=== Results by county ===
County	Jimmy Carter Democratic		Ronald Reagan Republican		John B. Anderson Independent		Ed Clark Libertarian		Margin		Total votes cast
County	#	%	#	%	#	%	#	%	#	%	Total votes cast
Barbour	3,451	48.70%	3,311	46.73%	292	4.12%	32	0.45%	140	1.97%	7,086
Berkeley	6,783	38.86%	9,955	57.04%	625	3.58%	91	0.52%	-3,172	-18.18%	17,454
Boone	7,515	62.63%	4,164	34.70%	268	2.23%	53	0.44%	3,351	27.93%	12,000
Braxton	3,795	59.22%	2,403	37.50%	173	2.70%	37	0.58%	1,392	21.72%	6,408
Brooke	6,430	54.51%	4,622	39.19%	634	5.38%	109	0.92%	1,808	15.32%	11,795
Cabell	17,732	44.79%	19,482	49.21%	2,146	5.42%	228	0.58%	-1,750	-4.42%	39,588
Calhoun	1,717	49.90%	1,606	46.67%	92	2.67%	26	0.76%	111	3.23%	3,441
Clay	2,185	58.08%	1,452	38.60%	102	2.71%	23	0.61%	733	19.48%	3,762
Doddridge	1,043	34.19%	1,888	61.88%	120	3.93%	0	0.00%	-845	-27.69%	3,051
Fayette	13,175	66.63%	5,784	29.25%	725	3.67%	90	0.46%	7,391	37.38%	19,774
Gilmer	1,854	53.18%	1,452	41.65%	153	4.39%	27	0.77%	402	11.53%	3,486
Grant	1,041	22.67%	3,452	75.19%	87	1.90%	11	0.24%	-2,411	-52.52%	4,591
Greenbrier	7,128	50.90%	6,221	44.42%	546	3.90%	109	0.78%	907	6.48%	14,004
Hampshire	2,522	45.16%	2,879	51.55%	157	2.81%	27	0.48%	-357	-6.39%	5,585
Hancock	8,784	53.32%	6,610	40.12%	917	5.57%	164	1.00%	2,174	13.20%	16,475
Hardy	2,050	45.57%	2,329	51.77%	99	2.20%	21	0.47%	-279	-6.20%	4,499
Harrison	18,813	54.37%	14,251	41.19%	1,339	3.87%	199	0.58%	4,562	13.18%	34,602
Jackson	4,120	38.94%	6,041	57.09%	352	3.33%	68	0.64%	-1,921	-18.15%	10,581
Jefferson	4,679	47.66%	4,454	45.37%	572	5.83%	113	1.15%	225	2.29%	9,818
Kanawha	42,829	46.68%	42,604	46.43%	5,838	6.36%	489	0.53%	225	0.25%	91,760
Lewis	3,455	45.39%	3,747	49.23%	359	4.72%	50	0.66%	-292	-3.84%	7,611
Lincoln	5,317	56.03%	4,009	42.24%	128	1.35%	36	0.38%	1,308	13.79%	9,490
Logan	12,024	68.99%	4,945	28.37%	381	2.19%	78	0.45%	7,079	40.62%	17,428
Marion	14,189	53.60%	10,952	41.37%	1,171	4.42%	159	0.60%	3,237	12.23%	26,471
Marshall	7,832	49.21%	7,252	45.56%	725	4.56%	107	0.67%	580	3.65%	15,916
Mason	5,683	46.94%	6,040	49.88%	312	2.58%	73	0.60%	-357	-2.94%	12,108
McDowell	9,822	70.44%	3,862	27.70%	216	1.55%	43	0.31%	5,960	42.74%	13,943
Mercer	11,804	47.71%	12,273	49.61%	563	2.28%	101	0.41%	-469	-1.90%	24,741
Mineral	4,671	41.43%	6,125	54.33%	386	3.42%	92	0.82%	-1,454	-12.90%	11,274
Mingo	9,328	70.24%	3,716	27.98%	208	1.57%	28	0.21%	5,612	42.26%	13,280
Monongalia	12,883	46.30%	11,972	43.02%	2,745	9.86%	226	0.81%	911	3.28%	27,826
Monroe	2,877	47.38%	2,999	49.39%	166	2.73%	30	0.49%	-122	-2.01%	6,072
Morgan	1,594	34.45%	2,833	61.23%	172	3.72%	28	0.61%	-1,239	-26.78%	4,627
Nicholas	5,265	55.33%	3,885	40.83%	322	3.38%	44	0.46%	1,380	14.50%	9,516
Ohio	10,973	45.96%	11,414	47.81%	1,334	5.59%	152	0.64%	-441	-1.85%	23,873
Pendleton	1,724	49.20%	1,677	47.86%	80	2.28%	23	0.66%	47	1.34%	3,504
Pleasants	1,494	43.34%	1,852	53.73%	84	2.44%	17	0.49%	-358	-10.39%	3,447
Pocahontas	2,170	49.83%	2,011	46.18%	150	3.44%	24	0.55%	159	3.65%	4,355
Preston	4,317	40.17%	5,828	54.23%	515	4.79%	86	0.80%	-1,511	-14.06%	10,746
Putnam	6,409	43.64%	7,561	51.48%	632	4.30%	84	0.57%	-1,152	-7.84%	14,686
Raleigh	16,955	58.81%	10,713	37.16%	1,046	3.63%	117	0.41%	6,242	21.65%	28,831
Randolph	5,937	54.36%	4,374	40.05%	518	4.74%	92	0.84%	1,563	14.31%	10,921
Ritchie	1,450	30.91%	3,081	65.68%	128	2.73%	32	0.68%	-1,631	-34.77%	4,691
Roane	2,498	41.96%	3,219	54.07%	184	3.09%	52	0.87%	-721	-12.11%	5,953
Summers	3,114	53.72%	2,456	42.37%	201	3.47%	26	0.45%	658	11.35%	5,797
Taylor	3,216	49.58%	3,010	46.40%	233	3.59%	28	0.43%	206	3.18%	6,487
Tucker	1,862	48.30%	1,798	46.64%	153	3.97%	42	1.09%	64	1.66%	3,855
Tyler	1,482	33.82%	2,707	61.78%	163	3.72%	30	0.68%	-1,225	-27.96%	4,382
Upshur	2,867	35.40%	4,751	58.66%	415	5.12%	66	0.81%	-1,884	-23.26%	8,099
Wayne	8,687	51.96%	7,541	45.10%	441	2.64%	50	0.30%	1,146	6.86%	16,719
Webster	2,578	64.87%	1,262	31.76%	117	2.94%	17	0.43%	1,316	33.11%	3,974
Wetzel	4,035	50.34%	3,588	44.77%	327	4.08%	65	0.81%	447	5.57%	8,015
Wirt	1,058	46.14%	1,176	51.29%	44	1.92%	15	0.65%	-118	-5.15%	2,293
Wood	13,622	38.36%	20,080	56.54%	1,536	4.33%	274	0.77%	-6,458	-18.18%	35,512
Wyoming	6,624	57.54%	4,537	39.41%	299	2.60%	52	0.45%	2,087	18.13%	11,512
Totals	367,462	49.81%	334,206	45.30%	31,691	4.30%	4,356	0.59%	33,256	4.51%	737,715

==== Counties that flipped from Democratic to Republican ====
- Cabell
- Hampshire
- Hardy
- Lewis
- Mason
- Mercer
- Mineral
- Monroe
- Pleasants
- Putnam
- Roane
- Wirt
