= 1980 United States presidential election in Minnesota =

- November 4, 1980
- Turnout: 72.14% ▼
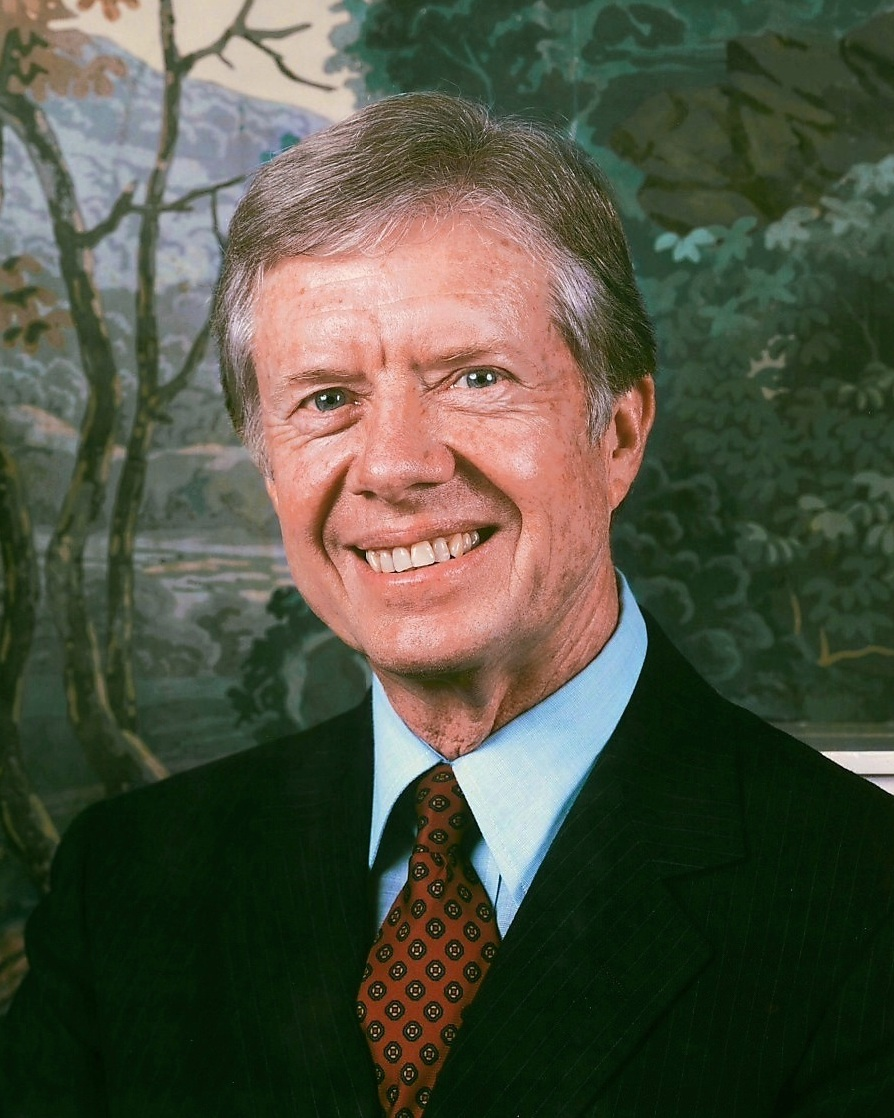

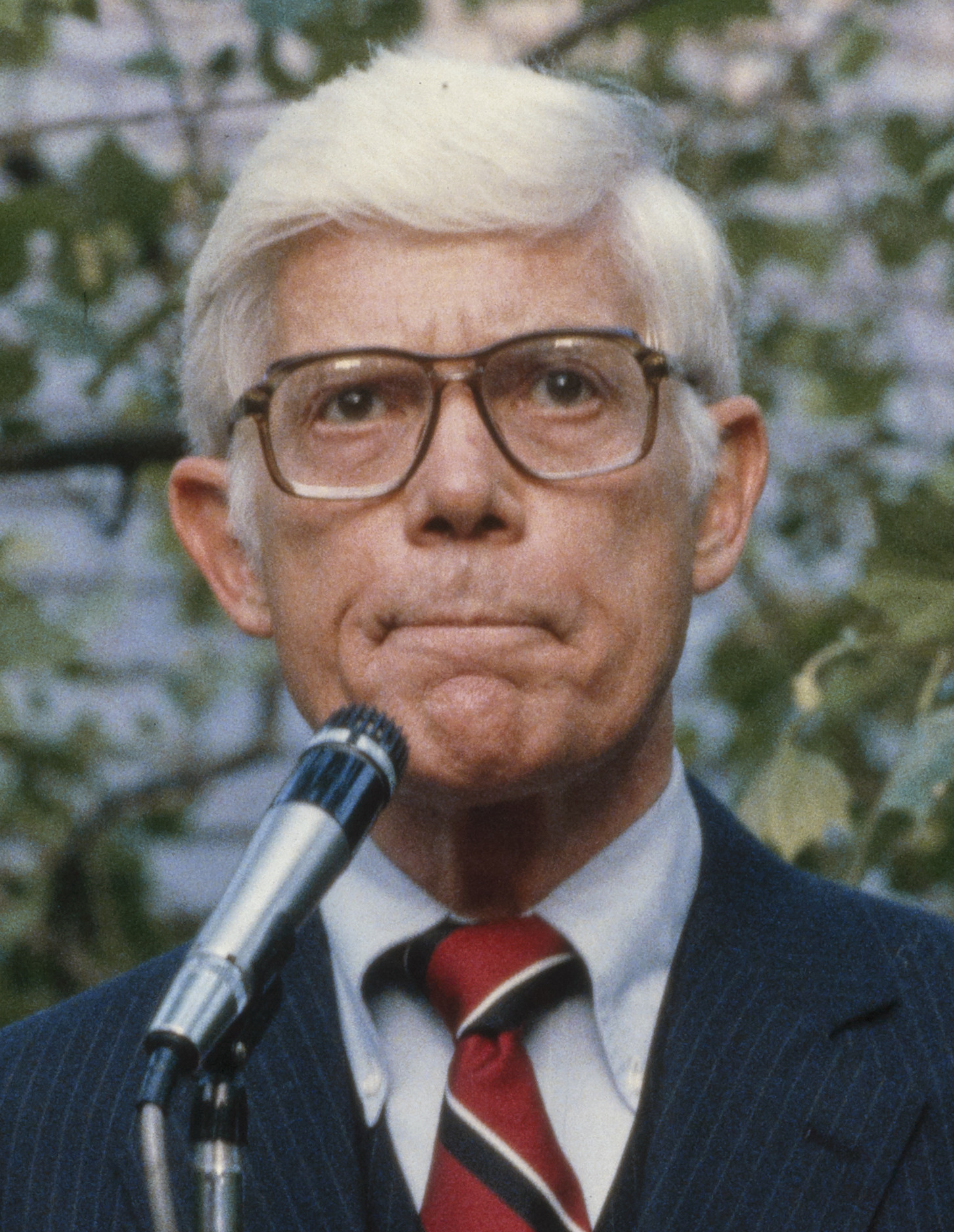
Nominee	Jimmy Carter	Ronald Reagan	John B. Anderson
Party	Democratic (DFL)	Ind.-Republican	Anderson Coalition
Home state	Georgia	California	Illinois
Running mate	Walter Mondale	George H. W. Bush	Patrick Lucey
Electoral vote	10	0	0
Popular vote	954,174	873,241	174,990
Percentage	46.50%	42.56%	8.53%
County results
Carter
40–50%
50–60%
60–70%
Reagan
40–50%
50–60%
60–70%
President before election
Jimmy Carter
Democratic
Elected President
Ronald Reagan
Republican

The 1980 United States presidential election in Minnesota took place on November 4, 1980, as part of the 1980 United States presidential election. State voters chose ten representatives, or electors to the Electoral College, who voted for President and Vice-president.

After having leaned strongly Republican until the 1930s, Minnesota had become one of the most Democratic states in the country during the 1970s: in 1972 it was George McGovern’s second-best state in his disastrous landslide loss and more than one-seventh of the 130 counties he won nationally lay within the state. In 1974, Governor Wendell Anderson won every county in the state in a landslide gubernatorial triumph during the aftermath of Watergate.

Late in February, Carter won the state’s Democratic Party caucus over Ted Kennedy, and defeated 1976 challenger Reagan did the same for the Republicans. At the beginning of the campaign in July, Reagan aimed to focus on the problem of Carter and his lack of leadership in the industrial strongholds of the Midwest like Minnesota, although by August polls were suggesting Carter was strong in the state despite John Anderson’s third-party candidacy. However, by the middle of October Minnesota was once again rated as a “tossup”.

Incumbent Democratic president Jimmy Carter carried the state by 80,933 votes over former California Governor Ronald Reagan. This gave him one of just seven victories in the election (the others being Maryland, West Virginia, Hawaii, Rhode Island, the District of Columbia and his home state of Georgia). Carter became the first Democrat to win Minnesota consecutively since Franklin D. Roosevelt, who won the state every year from 1932 to 1944. Despite Carter's win in Minnesota, Reagan became the first Republican to carry Mahnomen County since Warren G. Harding in 1920. Freeborn County would not vote Republican again until 2016 and Big Stone County until 2012.

Nationally, Reagan won the election with 489 electoral votes and 50.75% of the popular vote. Minnesota was the only state not to back Reagan in either of his presidential campaigns, casting its electoral votes in favor of Walter Mondale (a Minnesota native) in 1984.

== Results ==
1980 United States presidential election in Minnesota
Party	Candidate	Votes	Percentage	Electoral votes
Democratic (DFL)	Jimmy Carter (incumbent)	954,174	46.50%	10
Republican	Ronald Reagan	873,241	42.56%	0
Anderson Coalition	John B. Anderson	174,990	8.53%	0
Libertarian	Ed Clark	31,592	1.54%	0
Citizens	Barry Commoner	8,407	0.41%	0
American	No Candidate	6,139	0.30%	0
Communist	Gus Hall	1,184	0.03%	0
Socialist Workers	Clifton DeBerry	711	0.03%	0
Workers World	Deirdre Griswold	698	0.03%	0
Socialist	David McReynolds	536	0.03%	0
Write-ins	Write-ins	281	0.01%	0
Invalid or blank votes				—
Totals		2,079,451	100.00%	10
Voter turnout		75%		—

=== Results by county ===
County	Jimmy Carter DFL		Ronald Reagan Republican		John B. Anderson Anderson Coalition		Ed Clark Libertarian		Various candidates Other parties		Margin		Total votes cast
County	#	%	#	%	#	%	#	%	#	%	#	%	Total votes cast
Aitkin	3,677	47.94%	3,396	44.28%	380	4.95%	163	2.13%	54	0.70%	281	3.66%	7,670
Anoka	45,532	51.83%	33,100	37.68%	6,828	7.77%	1,631	1.86%	752	0.86%	12,432	14.15%	87,843
Becker	5,221	39.75%	6,848	52.14%	866	6.59%	151	1.15%	48	0.37%	-1,627	-12.39%	13,134
Beltrami	7,432	47.83%	6,481	41.71%	1,254	8.07%	253	1.63%	117	0.75%	951	6.12%	15,537
Benton	5,272	44.75%	5,513	46.79%	646	5.48%	213	1.81%	138	1.17%	-241	-2.04%	11,782
Big Stone	1,814	44.34%	1,950	47.67%	249	6.09%	56	1.37%	22	0.54%	-136	-3.33%	4,091
Blue Earth	10,930	41.82%	11,966	45.78%	2,698	10.32%	327	1.25%	217	0.83%	-1,036	-3.96%	26,138
Brown	4,915	34.80%	8,051	57.01%	842	5.96%	256	1.81%	58	0.41%	-3,136	-22.21%	14,122
Carlton	8,822	59.48%	4,760	32.09%	883	5.95%	279	1.88%	89	0.60%	4,062	27.39%	14,833
Carver	6,621	35.83%	9,909	53.62%	1,496	8.09%	333	1.80%	122	0.66%	-3,288	-17.79%	18,481
Cass	4,717	41.07%	6,119	53.28%	434	3.78%	178	1.55%	37	0.32%	-1,402	-12.21%	11,485
Chippewa	3,164	39.08%	4,252	52.51%	532	6.57%	117	1.44%	32	0.40%	-1,088	-13.43%	8,097
Chisago	6,240	49.83%	5,017	40.06%	939	7.50%	264	2.11%	63	0.50%	1,223	9.77%	12,523
Clay	8,940	39.72%	10,447	46.41%	2,773	12.32%	221	0.98%	127	0.56%	-1,507	-6.69%	22,508
Clearwater	1,955	47.26%	1,919	46.39%	185	4.47%	60	1.45%	18	0.44%	36	0.87%	4,137
Cook	871	38.44%	1,147	50.62%	182	8.03%	48	2.12%	18	0.79%	-276	-12.18%	2,266
Cottonwood	2,958	37.70%	4,258	54.26%	535	6.82%	77	0.98%	19	0.24%	-1,300	-16.56%	7,847
Crow Wing	9,323	43.01%	10,844	50.03%	1,046	4.83%	367	1.69%	97	0.45%	-1,521	-7.02%	21,677
Dakota	43,433	45.84%	40,708	42.96%	8,588	9.06%	1,526	1.61%	500	0.53%	2,725	2.88%	94,755
Dodge	2,698	38.00%	3,900	54.93%	367	5.17%	92	1.30%	43	0.61%	-1,202	-16.93%	7,100
Douglas	5,530	38.28%	7,778	53.85%	844	5.84%	226	1.56%	67	0.46%	-2,248	-15.57%	14,445
Faribault	3,620	34.54%	6,206	59.21%	525	5.01%	105	1.00%	25	0.24%	-2,586	-24.67%	10,481
Fillmore	4,010	35.45%	6,452	57.04%	650	5.75%	157	1.39%	43	0.38%	-2,442	-21.59%	11,312
Freeborn	8,212	46.17%	8,475	47.65%	808	4.54%	225	1.27%	65	0.37%	-263	-1.48%	17,785
Goodhue	8,566	42.31%	9,329	46.07%	1,964	9.70%	288	1.42%	101	0.50%	-763	-3.76%	20,248
Grant	1,822	42.65%	2,054	48.08%	333	7.79%	54	1.26%	9	0.21%	-232	-5.43%	4,272
Hennepin	239,592	47.41%	194,898	38.57%	56,390	11.16%	6,647	1.32%	7,845	1.55%	44,694	8.84%	505,372
Houston	3,218	33.94%	5,582	58.88%	477	5.03%	149	1.57%	55	0.58%	-2,364	-24.94%	9,481
Hubbard	2,840	37.80%	4,172	55.53%	365	4.86%	105	1.40%	31	0.41%	-1,332	-17.73%	7,513
Isanti	5,457	50.49%	4,480	41.45%	641	5.93%	179	1.66%	52	0.48%	977	9.04%	10,809
Itasca	12,134	54.59%	8,368	37.65%	1,080	4.86%	487	2.19%	159	0.72%	3,766	16.94%	22,228
Jackson	3,062	43.35%	3,391	48.00%	463	6.55%	123	1.74%	25	0.35%	-329	-4.65%	7,064
Kanabec	2,654	48.18%	2,500	45.39%	269	4.88%	68	1.23%	17	0.31%	154	2.79%	5,508
Kandiyohi	8,038	44.42%	8,480	46.86%	1,244	6.87%	276	1.53%	57	0.32%	-442	-2.44%	18,095
Kittson	1,407	39.33%	1,875	52.42%	243	6.79%	36	1.01%	16	0.45%	-468	-13.09%	3,577
Koochiching	4,181	50.68%	3,433	41.61%	496	6.01%	110	1.33%	30	0.36%	748	9.07%	8,250
Lac qui Parle	2,457	41.62%	2,981	50.50%	334	5.66%	112	1.90%	19	0.32%	-524	-8.88%	5,903
Lake	3,864	55.75%	2,414	34.83%	443	6.39%	160	2.31%	50	0.72%	1,450	20.92%	6,931
Lake of the Woods	763	38.15%	1,052	52.60%	128	6.40%	44	2.20%	13	0.65%	-289	-14.45%	2,000
Le Sueur	5,161	44.40%	5,478	47.12%	731	6.29%	187	1.61%	68	0.58%	-317	-2.72%	11,625
Lincoln	1,640	39.80%	2,122	51.49%	295	7.16%	48	1.16%	16	0.39%	-482	-11.69%	4,121
Lyon	5,626	43.58%	5,852	45.33%	1,129	8.74%	237	1.84%	67	0.52%	-226	-1.75%	12,911
Mahnomen	1,175	44.59%	1,275	48.39%	153	5.81%	23	0.87%	9	0.34%	-100	-3.80%	2,635
Marshall	2,636	38.91%	3,638	53.70%	397	5.86%	80	1.18%	24	0.35%	-1,002	-14.79%	6,775
Martin	4,301	34.98%	7,057	57.40%	751	6.11%	148	1.20%	37	0.30%	-2,756	-22.42%	12,294
McLeod	4,987	35.53%	7,819	55.71%	852	6.07%	308	2.19%	69	0.49%	-2,832	-20.18%	14,035
Meeker	4,238	41.98%	5,032	49.85%	668	6.62%	124	1.23%	33	0.33%	-794	-7.87%	10,095
Mille Lacs	4,443	49.30%	3,860	42.83%	550	6.10%	126	1.40%	34	0.38%	583	6.47%	9,013
Morrison	6,930	49.44%	6,296	44.91%	559	3.99%	174	1.24%	59	0.42%	634	4.53%	14,018
Mower	10,538	51.85%	7,908	38.91%	1,465	7.21%	281	1.38%	133	0.65%	2,630	12.94%	20,325
Murray	2,714	43.87%	3,004	48.56%	359	5.80%	88	1.42%	21	0.34%	-290	-4.69%	6,186
Nicollet	5,400	39.64%	6,436	47.25%	1,519	11.15%	201	1.48%	66	0.48%	-1,036	-7.61%	13,622
Nobles	4,703	45.37%	4,706	45.40%	657	6.34%	178	1.72%	121	1.17%	-3	-0.03%	10,365
Norman	2,253	46.17%	2,192	44.92%	369	7.56%	46	0.94%	20	0.41%	61	1.25%	4,880
Olmsted	13,983	34.18%	22,704	55.50%	3,638	8.89%	438	1.07%	148	0.36%	-8,721	-21.32%	40,911
Otter Tail	9,108	34.85%	15,091	57.74%	1,538	5.88%	331	1.27%	70	0.27%	-5,983	-22.89%	26,138
Pennington	3,101	41.81%	3,715	50.09%	465	6.27%	69	0.93%	66	0.89%	-614	-8.28%	7,416
Pine	5,121	52.86%	3,899	40.25%	467	4.82%	152	1.57%	48	0.50%	1,222	12.61%	9,687
Pipestone	2,392	38.31%	3,207	51.37%	561	8.99%	72	1.15%	11	0.18%	-815	-13.06%	6,243
Polk	7,151	40.53%	9,036	51.21%	1,207	6.84%	163	0.92%	87	0.49%	-1,885	-10.68%	17,644
Pope	2,527	41.07%	3,159	51.34%	354	5.75%	75	1.22%	38	0.62%	-632	-10.27%	6,153
Ramsey	124,774	53.61%	78,860	33.88%	23,222	9.98%	3,650	1.57%	2,238	0.96%	45,914	19.73%	232,744
Red Lake	1,318	48.69%	1,223	45.18%	116	4.29%	31	1.15%	19	0.70%	95	3.51%	2,707
Redwood	2,952	30.44%	5,993	61.79%	548	5.65%	151	1.56%	55	0.57%	-3,041	-31.35%	9,699
Renville	4,058	38.85%	5,544	53.08%	653	6.25%	155	1.48%	34	0.33%	-1,486	-14.23%	10,444
Rice	9,531	46.10%	8,168	39.51%	2,414	11.68%	350	1.69%	210	1.02%	1,363	6.59%	20,673
Rock	2,089	36.57%	3,164	55.38%	397	6.95%	54	0.95%	9	0.16%	-1,075	-18.81%	5,713
Roseau	2,616	41.41%	3,358	53.16%	259	4.10%	55	0.87%	29	0.46%	-742	-11.75%	6,317
St. Louis	69,403	60.52%	33,407	29.13%	8,719	7.60%	2,202	1.92%	943	0.82%	35,996	31.39%	114,674
Scott	9,115	45.49%	9,018	45.00%	1,475	7.36%	356	1.78%	74	0.37%	97	0.49%	20,038
Sherburne	6,229	45.73%	6,035	44.31%	985	7.23%	300	2.20%	71	0.52%	194	1.42%	13,620
Sibley	2,521	32.99%	4,460	58.36%	509	6.66%	121	1.58%	31	0.41%	-1,939	-25.37%	7,642
Stearns	21,862	42.43%	24,888	48.31%	3,555	6.90%	861	1.67%	356	0.69%	-3,026	-5.88%	51,522
Steele	5,095	35.68%	7,805	54.66%	1,087	7.61%	240	1.68%	52	0.36%	-2,710	-18.98%	14,279
Stevens	2,559	39.52%	3,283	50.69%	524	8.09%	74	1.14%	36	0.56%	-724	-11.17%	6,476
Swift	3,245	47.56%	2,943	43.13%	511	7.49%	102	1.49%	22	0.32%	302	4.43%	6,823
Todd	4,975	41.08%	6,451	53.27%	451	3.72%	194	1.60%	40	0.33%	-1,476	-12.19%	12,111
Traverse	1,258	41.52%	1,574	51.95%	159	5.25%	28	0.92%	11	0.36%	-316	-10.43%	3,030
Wabasha	3,712	39.27%	4,986	52.75%	549	5.81%	165	1.75%	41	0.43%	-1,274	-13.48%	9,453
Wadena	2,635	37.10%	4,089	57.57%	265	3.73%	97	1.37%	17	0.24%	-1,454	-20.47%	7,103
Waseca	3,535	38.01%	4,801	51.62%	777	8.35%	163	1.75%	25	0.27%	-1,266	-13.61%	9,301
Washington	25,634	46.69%	22,718	41.38%	5,050	9.20%	1,183	2.15%	317	0.58%	2,916	5.31%	54,902
Watonwan	2,442	37.07%	3,629	55.09%	415	6.30%	80	1.21%	21	0.32%	-1,187	-18.02%	6,587
Wilkin	1,496	36.43%	2,224	54.15%	318	7.74%	58	1.41%	11	0.27%	-728	-17.72%	4,107
Winona	9,814	42.85%	10,332	45.11%	1,780	7.77%	573	2.50%	404	1.76%	-518	-2.26%	22,903
Wright	12,383	45.88%	12,293	45.54%	1,692	6.27%	526	1.95%	97	0.36%	90	0.34%	26,991
Yellow Medicine	2,833	38.18%	4,004	53.95%	456	6.14%	111	1.50%	17	0.23%	-1,171	-15.77%	7,421
Totals	954,174	46.50%	873,241	42.56%	174,990	8.53%	31,592	1.54%	17,956	0.88%	80,933	3.94%	2,051,953

==== Counties that flipped from Democratic to Republican ====
- Becker
- Benton
- Big Stone
- Blue Earth
- Chippewa
- Clay
- Cass
- Crow Wing
- Douglas
- Freeborn
- Grant
- Hubbard
- Jackson
- Kandiyohi
- Kittson
- Lac qui Parle
- Lake of the Woods
- Le Sueur
- Lincoln
- Lyon
- Mahnomen
- Marshall
- Meeker
- Murray
- Nobles
- Pennington
- Pipestone
- Red Lake
- Polk
- Pope
- Renville
- Roseau
- Stevens
- Stearns
- Todd
- Traverse
- Wadena
- Winona
- Wilkin
- Yellow Medicine

== See also ==
- United States presidential elections in Minnesota
