= 1980 United States presidential election in Hawaii =

- November 4, 1980
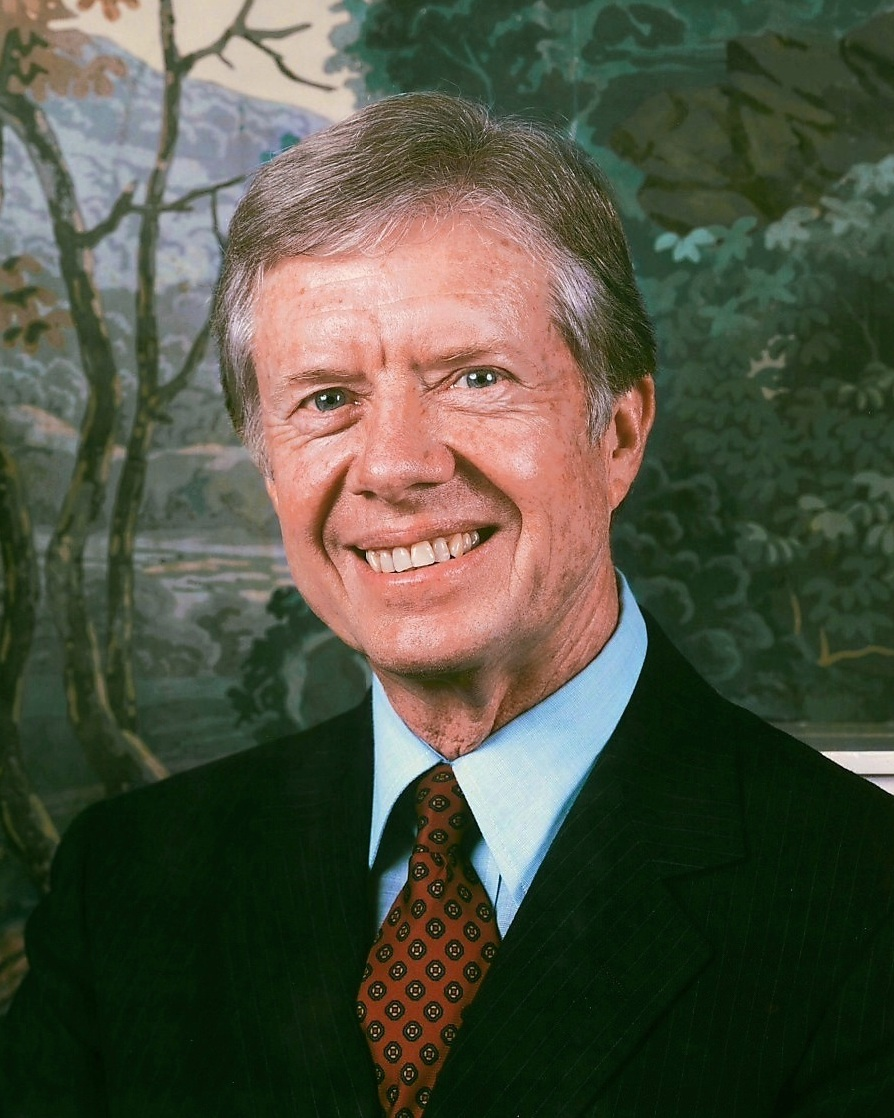

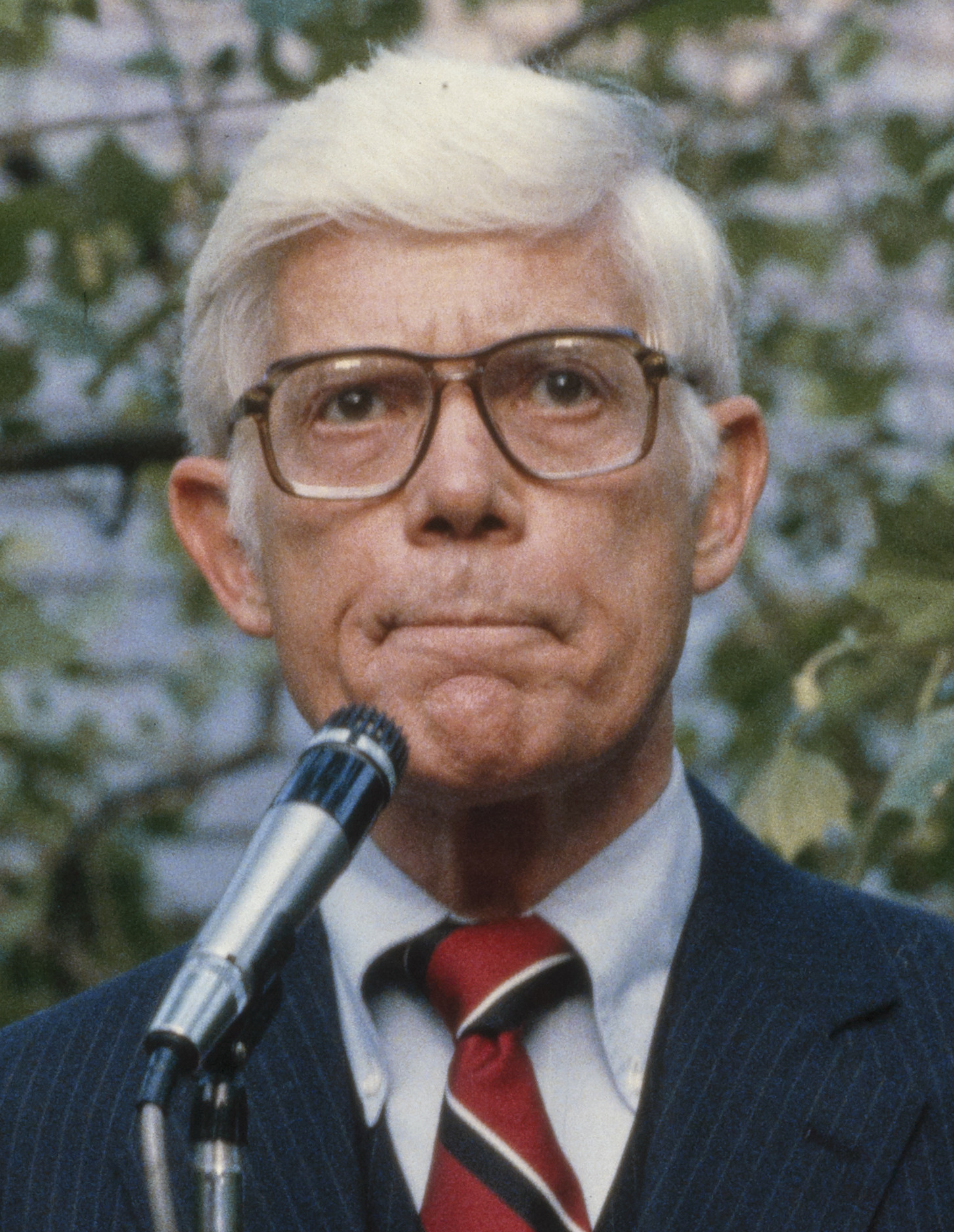
Nominee	Jimmy Carter	Ronald Reagan	John B. Anderson
Party	Democratic	Republican	Independent
Home state	Georgia	California	Illinois
Running mate	Walter Mondale	George H. W. Bush	Patrick Lucey
Electoral vote	4	0	0
Popular vote	135,879	130,112	32,021
Percentage	44.80%	42.90%	10.56%
County results
Carter
40–50%
50–60%
Reagan
40–50%
President before election
Jimmy Carter
Democratic
Elected President
Ronald Reagan
Republican

The 1980 United States presidential election in Hawaii took place on November 4, 1980. All 50 states and The District of Columbia, were part of the 1980 United States presidential election. Hawaii voters chose four electors to the Electoral College, who voted for president and vice president.

Hawaii was one of the six states that President Jimmy Carter (D) won. His margin was 1.9 points, his narrowest victory margin in any state. Hawaii is a very liberal state, and both of the state's U.S. senators have been Democrats since 1977, which is partly the reason Reagan lost, albeit very narrowly. As of 2024, this is the second of two times (the first being 1960) in which not all of Hawaii's counties voted for the same candidate. This was the second of three times in which Oahu supported a Republican on the presidential level. This was the only election since its statehood in which Hawaii did not vote the same as New York.

== Results ==
1980 United States presidential election in Hawaii
Party	Candidate	Votes	Percentage	Electoral votes
Democratic	Jimmy Carter (incumbent)	135,879	44.80%	4
Republican	Ronald Reagan	130,112	42.90%	0
Independent	John Anderson	32,031	10.56%	0
Libertarian	Ed Clark	3,269	1.08%	0
Citizens	Barry Commoner	1,548	0.51%	0
Communist	Gus Hall	458	0.15%	0
Totals		303,287	100.00%	4

=== Results by county ===
County	Jimmy Carter Democratic		Ronald Reagan Republican		John B. Anderson Independent		Other Candidates		Margin		Total votes cast
County	#	%	#	%	#	%	#	%	#	%	#
Hawaii	17,630	49.16%	14,247	39.73%	3,091	8.62%	893	2.49%	3,383	9.43%	35,861
Honolulu	96,472	42.88%	99,596	44.27%	25,331	11.26%	3,596	1.60%	-3,124	-1.39%	224,995
Kauaʻi	9,081	54.64%	5,883	35.39%	1,352	8.13%	305	1.84%	3,198	19.25%	16,621
Maui	12,674	49.22%	10,359	40.23%	2,237	8.69%	481	1.87%	2,315	8.99%	25,751
Totals	135,879	44.80%	130,112	42.90%	32,021	10.56%	5,275	1.74%	5,767	1.90%	303,287

==== Counties that flipped from Democratic to Republican ====
- Honolulu

=== Results by congressional district ===
District	Reagan	Carter	Representative
1st	44.9%	43.6%	Cecil Heftel
2nd	42.7%	47.2%	Daniel Akaka
