= 1980 United States presidential election in Maryland =

- November 4, 1980
- Turnout: 75.4%
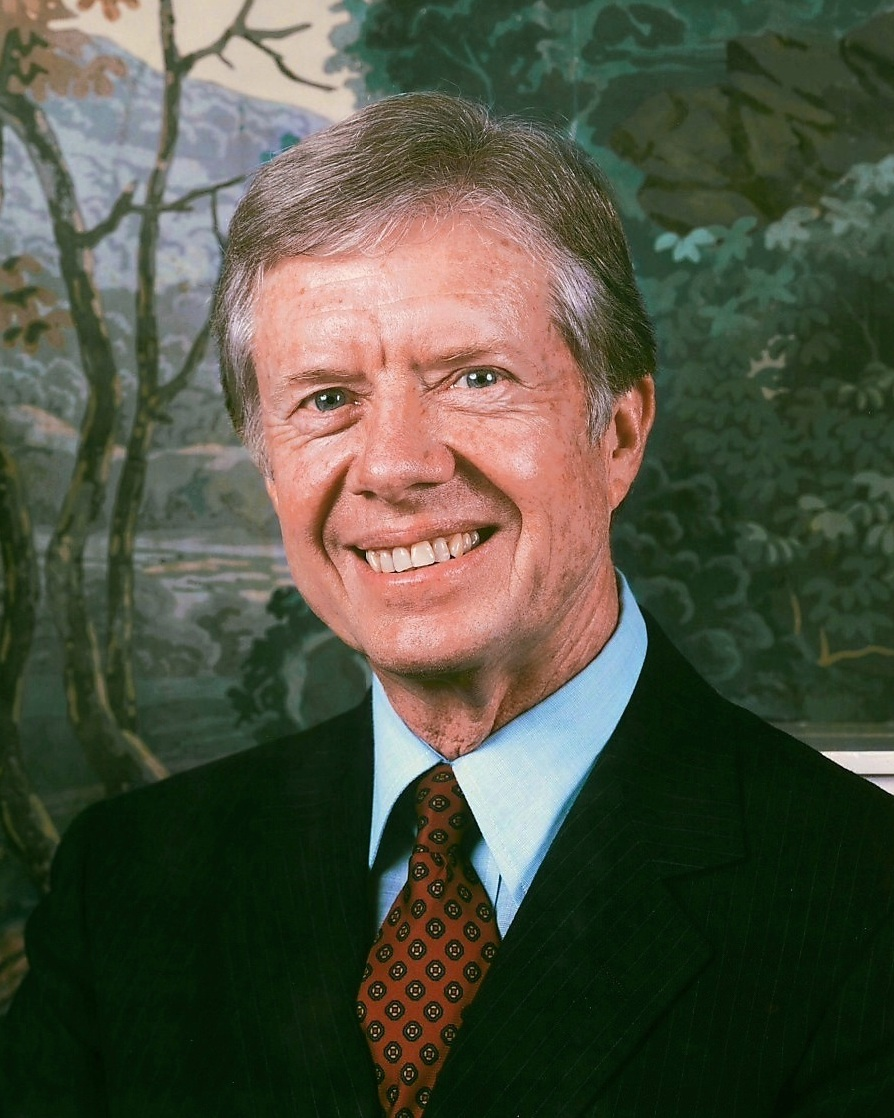

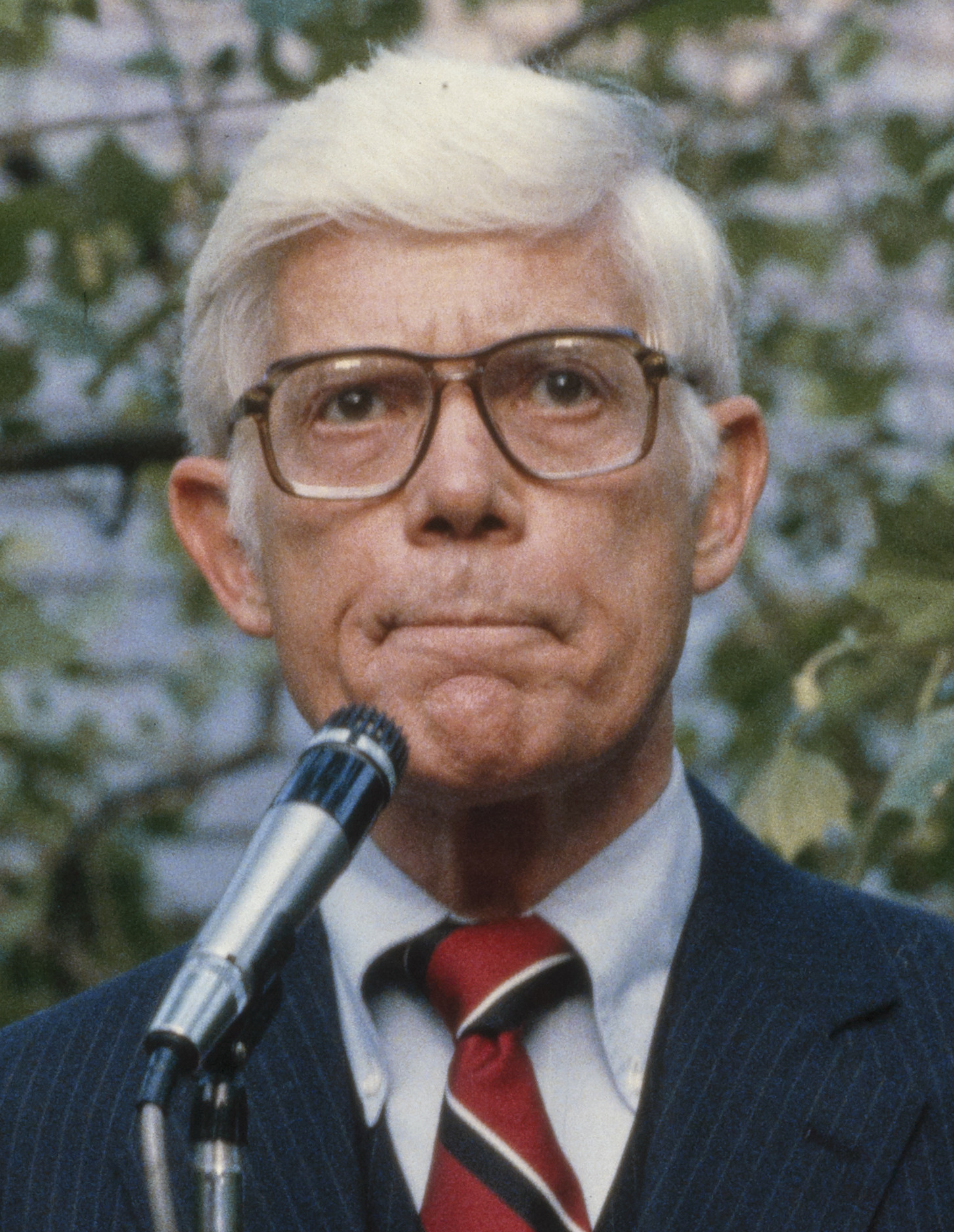
Nominee	Jimmy Carter	Ronald Reagan	John B. Anderson
Party	Democratic	Republican	Independent
Home state	Georgia	California	Illinois
Running mate	Walter Mondale	George H. W. Bush	Patrick Lucey
Electoral vote	10	0	0
Popular vote	726,161	680,606	119,537
Percentage	47.12%	44.18%	7.76%
County results
Carter
40–50%
50–60%
70–80%
Reagan
40–50%
50–60%
60–70%
President before election
Jimmy Carter
Democratic
Elected President
Ronald Reagan
Republican

The 1980 United States presidential election in Maryland took place on November 4, 1980, as part of the 1980 United States presidential election. Voters chose 10 representatives, or electors, to the Electoral College, who voted for president and vice president.

Maryland was won by incumbent President Jimmy Carter (D-Georgia), with 47.12% of the popular vote, over former Governor Ronald Reagan (R-California) with 44.18% of the popular vote, and Republican US Representative John B. Anderson running as an independent candidate (I-Illinois) with 7.76% of the popular vote. Reagan ultimately won the national vote, defeating Carter; Maryland was one of only six states, along with the District of Columbia, to back the embattled incumbent.

On election night, several news outlets incorrectly called the state for Reagan. In a similar vein, many of the same news outlets also called Massachusetts for President Carter, despite the fact that Reagan would ultimately end up narrowly winning Massachusetts.

In this election, Maryland voted 12.7% to the left of the nation at-large, or an 8.69 percent bigger differential than in 1976. As of the 2024 presidential election, this is the last presidential election in which the Democratic candidate won Maryland without carrying suburban Baltimore County, Howard County, or Montgomery County. This election marked the first time since 1908 in which Prince George's County did not vote for the winner of the presidential election. This is one of three elections between 1888 and 2000 in which the state voted for the national loser (along with 1948 and 1968).

== Results ==
1980 United States presidential election in Maryland
Party	Candidate	Votes	Percentage	Electoral votes
Democratic	Jimmy Carter (incumbent)	726,161	47.12%	10
Republican	Ronald Reagan	680,606	44.18%	0
Independent	John B. Anderson	119,537	7.76%	0
Libertarian	Ed Clark	14,192	0.92%	0
Totals		1,540,496	100.0%	10

=== Results by county ===
County	Jimmy Carter Democratic		Ronald Reagan Republican		John B. Anderson Independent		Ed Clark Libertarian		Margin		Total votes cast
County	#	%	#	%	#	%	#	%	#	%	Total votes cast
Allegany	12,167	38.65%	17,512	55.62%	1,486	4.72%	319	1.01%	-5,345	-16.97%	31,484
Anne Arundel	50,780	38.58%	69,443	52.76%	10,020	7.61%	1,389	1.06%	-18,663	-14.18%	131,632
Baltimore	121,280	43.33%	132,490	47.33%	23,096	8.25%	3,051	1.09%	-11,210	-4.00%	279,917
Baltimore City	191,911	72.48%	57,902	21.87%	13,112	4.95%	1,850	0.70%	134,009	50.61%	264,775
Calvert	4,745	43.65%	5,440	50.05%	590	5.43%	95	0.87%	-695	-6.40%	10,870
Caroline	2,833	41.88%	3,582	52.95%	291	4.30%	59	0.87%	-749	-11.07%	6,765
Carroll	10,393	31.55%	19,859	60.29%	2,243	6.81%	445	1.35%	-9,466	-28.74%	32,940
Cecil	7,937	42.12%	9,673	51.33%	1,037	5.50%	199	1.06%	-1,736	-9.21%	18,846
Charles	8,887	40.36%	11,807	53.62%	1,153	5.24%	173	0.79%	-2,920	-13.26%	22,020
Dorchester	4,908	46.52%	5,160	48.91%	360	3.41%	122	1.16%	-252	-2.39%	10,550
Frederick	13,629	34.83%	22,033	56.31%	2,891	7.39%	577	1.47%	-8,404	-21.48%	39,130
Garrett	2,708	31.69%	5,475	64.07%	270	3.16%	92	1.08%	-2,767	-32.38%	8,545
Harford	20,042	39.34%	26,713	52.44%	3,761	7.38%	425	0.83%	-6,671	-13.10%	50,941
Howard	20,702	40.12%	24,272	47.04%	6,028	11.68%	597	1.16%	-3,570	-6.92%	51,599
Kent	2,986	47.37%	2,889	45.83%	371	5.89%	58	0.92%	97	1.54%	6,304
Montgomery	105,822	39.76%	125,515	47.16%	32,730	12.30%	2,084	0.78%	-19,693	-7.40%	266,151
Prince George's	98,757	50.91%	78,977	40.71%	14,574	7.51%	1,679	0.87%	19,780	10.20%	193,987
Queen Anne's	3,820	41.92%	4,749	52.12%	480	5.27%	63	0.69%	-929	-10.20%	9,112
Somerset	3,342	48.18%	3,312	47.74%	215	3.10%	68	0.98%	30	0.44%	6,937
St. Mary's	6,773	42.18%	8,267	51.49%	892	5.56%	124	0.77%	-1,494	-9.31%	16,056
Talbot	3,995	37.30%	6,044	56.43%	570	5.32%	102	0.95%	-2,049	-19.13%	10,711
Washington	14,118	36.12%	22,901	58.60%	1,689	4.32%	375	0.96%	-8,783	-22.48%	39,083
Wicomico	9,431	43.05%	11,229	51.26%	1,092	4.99%	153	0.70%	-1,798	-8.21%	21,905
Worcester	4,195	40.98%	5,362	52.38%	586	5.72%	93	0.91%	-1,167	-11.40%	10,236
Totals	726,161	47.14%	680,606	44.18%	119,537	7.76%	14,192	0.92%	45,555	2.96%	1,540,496

==== Counties that flipped from Democratic to Republican ====
- Allegany
- Calvert
- Cecil
- Charles
- Montgomery
- St. Mary's

== See also ==
- United States presidential elections in Maryland
- 1980 United States presidential election
- 1980 United States elections
