= List of Haitian films =

This is a list of films produced in Haiti (Cinema of Haiti) and by the Haitian diaspora elsewhere:

== A ==
- A la mise pour Rodrig by Claude L.C. Mancuso (1980)
- Anba dlo (2025)
- Albert Mangones, l'espace public (2010) by Arnold Antonin
- Alatraka pou Baba by Raynald Delerme
- Alelouya by Richard J. Arens (2005)
- Ana by Valentin C. Lustra (2011)
- Anita (1982)
- Aristide and the Endless Revolution (2005) by Nicolas Rossier
- Art Naif and Repression in Haiti (1976) by Arnold Antonin
- Ayiti Mon Amour (2016)
- Ayiti Toma (2014) by Joseph Hillel

== B ==
- Barikad by Richard Senecal (2003)
- Blooming Hope: Harvesting Smiles in Port-de-Paix (2010)
- Breaking Leaves (1998)
- Belle Enfant Noire by Jean René Descayette (2006)avec la participation de Black Alex

== C ==
- Café au lait, bien sucré (2005)
- Can sculpture save the village of Noailles? (2009) by Arnold Antonin
- Canne amère (1983)
- Cedor ou l'esthétique de la modestie (2002) by Arnold Antonin
- Chère Catherine (1997)
- ChomeCo by Richard J. Arens (2007)
- Collusion (2009) Herold Israel & Peter Ronald Berlus
- Couloir de L'amitié by Vladimir Thelisma (2010)
- Coup de foudre (Frantz Saint Louis) 2007
- Cousines by Richard Senecal (2006)
- Culture Clash (2014) by Jean-René Rinvil

== D ==
- Des hommes et dieux (2002)
- Desounen: Dialogue with Death (1994)
- Destin Tragique by Vladimir Thelisma (2006)
- Disturbed by Vladimir Lescouflair (2010)
- Dolores by Herold Israel (2006)
- Double jeu by Vladimir Thelisma (2001)

== E ==
- Endurance by Samuel Vincent (2015)
- E Pluribus Unum (2001)
- Et moi je suis belle (1962)
- Évangile du cochon créole, L′ (2004)

== F ==
- Fabiola by Armelle Jacotin (2006)
- Fam se rat by Wilfort Estimable (2009)
- Forgiveness (Le Pardon) by Benedict Lamartine (2008)
- Forgiveness 2 by Samuel Vincent (2012)
- Founérailles byRaynald Delerme (1986)
- Fò Dimanch – Fò Lanmò, short documentary with Jan Mapou by Ronald Osias (2016)
- Freda (2021)

== H ==
- Haiti - Apocalypse Now - January 12, 2010 (2011) by Arnold Antonin
- Haiti: Harvest of Hope (1994) by Kevin Pina
- Haiti - Le silence des chiens (1994)
- Haïti: la fin des chimères?... (2004)
- Haiti, le chemin de la liberté (1973) by Arnold Antonin
- Haitian Corner (1988)
- Haitian Slave Children (2001)
- Haiti Cherie: Wind Of Hope by Richard J. Arens (2010)
- Haiti: Triumph, Sorrow, and the Struggle of a People (2010) (Jonas Nosile) (Vieux-Bourgeois Picture) (ABC TV)
- Hegel's Angel (2008) by Simone Rapisarda Casanova
- Herby, Jazz and Haitian Music (2012) by Arnold Antonin
- Histoire D'infidèles (2009), Peter Ronald Berlus

== I ==
- I Love You Anne (2003) by Richard Senecal
- I Love You Anne 2 (2014) by Richard Senecal
- Infidélité by Raynald Delerme
- Impasse (2011) by Jean-René Rinvil
- Izabel (2017) by Samuel Pierre Louis

== J ==
- Jacques Roumain, the passion for a country (2008) by Arnold Antonin
- Journee de couleur
- July-7 by Robenson Lauvince

== K ==
- Krik? Krak! Tales of a Nightmare (1988), based on a novel by Edwidge Danticat
- Kafou (2017), Un film de Bruno Mourral sur le Kidnapping.
- Kidnapping Inc. (2024), by Bruno Mourral
- Kreyolizay (1960), short documentary with Jan Mapou by Ronald Osias (2019)

== L ==
- L'Amour Et L'Amitié by TUTU Desmonthene (2005)
- L'Enquête se Poursuit by Raynald Delerme
- L'Homme sur les quais (1993)
- L'Imposteur Impromptu by Zagallo Prince, featuring Stardeak Durand and Marie Yves-Elda Calixte (2011)
- La Face De Judas by Nacha Laguerre, (2005)
- La Famille Chabi by Nacha Laguerre (2007)
- Lala Desma Duclair (2010)
- La Femme de mon Ami by Raynald Delerme]
- La Peur D'aimer (2000) by Reginal Lubin
- La Pluie d'espoir (2007) by jack roche
- La Rebelle (2005)
- La Ronde des vodu (1987)
- La vengeance de Rodney (Laura 2) (2009) by Valentin C. Lustra
- La Vie de Job by Valentin C. Lustra
- Lakay (2011) by Hugues Gentillon
- Lakay (2014) by Tirf Alexius
- Lavichè: A crisis for the poor in Haiti (2002) by Jean-René Rinvil
- Laura by Valentin C. Lustra
- Le Miracle de la foi (2005)
- Le President a-t-il Le Sida (2006) by Arnold Antonin
- Les Amours d'un Zombi (2010) by Arnold Antonin
- Les Aventures de Jessica by Valentin C. Lustra
- Les Couleurs de la Dignite by Vladimir Thelisma (2006)
- Les Evades (2013) by Valentin C. Lustra
- Les Gens de Bien (1988) by Raynald Delerme
- Les tontons noel aux sacs vides by Jean Claude Fanfan
- Life in a Haitian Valley Film Study (1934)
- Lovdatnet (2009) by Herold Israel and Peter Ronald Berlus
- Love Me Haiti (2014) by Hugues Gentillon
- Lumumba (2000) by Raoul Peck

== M ==
- Mea Culpa by Samuel Vincent (2011)
- Ma femme et le voisin by Riquet Michel (2004)
- Miami en action
- My name is... by Richard J. Arens (2007)
- Married Man by Robenson Lauvince (2019)
- Mountains (2023) by Monica Sorelle

== N ==
- Natalie by Samuel Vincent (2007)

== P ==
- Player 1/2 by Herold Israel (2006)
- Pluie d'espoir (2005)
- Pouki se mwen by Reginal Lubin
- Pour l'Amour de Suzie by Raynald Delerme] (2000)
- Prefete Duffaut - Piety and Urban Imagination (2006) by Arnold Antonin
- Profit & Nothing But! (2001)
- Prosameres, Herold Israel (2010)

== R ==
- Remo (2008)
- Rezistans (1997)
- Royal Bonbon (2002)
- The Ransom (2022)

== S ==
- Sarah (2009) by Samuel Vincent
- Sarah 2 (2015) by Samuel Vincent
- San Papye (2008) by Hans Patrick Domercant
- Santo contra la magia negra (1973)
- Sentaniz (2011) by Nacha Laguerre
- Sherico s.a. (1989) by Raynald Delerme
- Show Kola (2008) by Richard J. Arens
- Six Exceptional Women (2012) by Arnold Antonin
- Sonson (2003) by Jean-Claude Bourjolly
- Souvenance (1991)
- Stones in the Sun (2012) by Patricia Benoit
- Suspicion (2015) by Samuel Pierre Louis

== T ==
- Temptation by Samuel Vincent (2005)
- The Love of a Zombi or Can a Zombi be President? (2010) by Arnold Antonin
- The Son Of The Evil by Tutu Desmonthene (2007)
- TIGA: Haiti, Dream, Creation, Possession, Madness (2006) by Arnold Antonin

== W ==
- Where The Justice At (2009) by Tony Delerme
- White Darkness, The (2002)

== V ==
- Vengeance Sexuelle (2009) by Belus Roosvelt
- Vocation by Valery Numa

== X ==
- Xtreme Blue (2008), Herold Israel

== Z ==
- Zatrap (1980)

== See also ==
- Cinema of Haiti
- Cinema of the Caribbean
- List of Caribbean films
