= Sea Change Radio =

- Other names: Corporate Watchdog Radio
- Running time: 30 minutes
- Country of origin: United States
- Language: English
- Syndicates: Public Radio Exchange, Pacifica Network, Radio4all.net
- Starring: Alex Wise
- Created by: Bill Baue and Sanford Lewis
- Recording studio: San Francisco, California
- Original release: 2005
- Website: www.cchange.net
- Podcast: [itpc://www.cchange.net/feed/podcast/ www.cchange.net/feed/podcast/]

Sea Change Radio is a weekly radio show whose mission is to advance the shift toward environmental sustainability. The show is nationally syndicated and podcast globally. Launched in January 2009, the show evolved from Corporate Watchdog Radio, founded by Bill Baue and Sanford Lewis in 2005. Francesca Rheannon joined the CWR team in 2007 as Lewis phased out. Alex Wise took over as host and producer in May 2010.

Sea Change Radio is an environmental interview program, featuring guests whose work is advancing the environmental and sustainability movement. The show has featured technology innovators, grassroots activists, public policy advocates, and pioneers in corporate social responsibility. The show is carried by a number of radio affiliates through Public Radio Exchange, Audioport.org, and Radio4all.net, and listeners may stream the weekly podcast on the Sea Change Radio website, or through iTunes.

== History ==
From 2004 through 2006, Bill Baue served on the board of directors of Valley Free Radio (WXOJ-LP 103.3 FM), helping steer the station through its launch and hosting of the 2005 Grassroots Radio Conference. In 2005 Baue and corporate social responsibility attorney, Sanford Lewis, launched Corporate Watchdog Radio. In 2007 Francesca Rheannon joined the team as an on-air contributor. In August 2008, the driving interests of the hosts and input from affiliates and fans prompted a change in the name and orientation of the program from corporate social responsibility to social, environmental, and economic sustainability. In 2009 Corporate Watchdog Radio re-launched as Sea Change Radio.

In 2010, Alex Wise, a Bay Area media consultant and progressive activist, began making contributions as Sea Change Radio's West Coast correspondent. By May 2010 Rehannon and Lewis had both left the show and Baue had stepped down as executive producer and host. Wise assumed the helm of Sea Change Radio as producer and host, although Baue has continued to make occasional contributions and consults on content and guest recommendations.

== Guests ==
The program seeks out well-known luminaries in the environmental movement such as Bill McKibben, Stewart Brand, Van Jones and Louie Psihoyos, but also features less-known personalities making a difference through research, activism, community organizing, and responsible business practices. Some of the stories in this latter category have focused on technological advances promising environmentally sustainable biofuels and plastic production, community activism to raise environmental awareness among low-income inner-city youth, and responsible practices in the production and distribution of products from coffee to diamonds.

== Distribution ==
Sea Change Radio is distributed to public radio stations throughout the US, primarily through content exchange services such as Radio for All and Public Radio Exchange. Some broadcasters also access the weekly show directly from the Sea Change Radio site, or through a direct relationship with the producer. Currently, Sea Change Radio is broadcast weekly by over 30 affiliates.
