= Sawaya =

Sawaya is a surname. Notable people with the surname include:

- Erik Sawaya (born 1984), Portrait and Ballet Photographer
- Christina Sawaya (born 1980), Lebanese beauty queen
- George Sawaya (1923–2003), American actor and stuntman
- George Sawaya Jr. (1930–2012), known as George Murdock, Lebanese-American actor
- Kunio Sawaya (born c. 1950), Japanese engineer
- Nathan Sawaya (born 1973), American Lego artist
- Nicole Sawaya (1952–2018), Lebanese-American media executive
