= Pervasiveness doctrine =

Doctrine stating that media content of broadcasts is subject to regulation

In broadcast law (particularly within U.S. law), the pervasiveness doctrine is the doctrine stating that media content of broadcasts is subject to regulation because broadcast radio waves are available to anyone and therefore "uniquely pervasive". In general, profanity and sex, or other adult material deemed "indecent" by a broadcasting authority, may not be broadcast outside of overnight "watershed" or "safe harbor" hours when children are unlikely to be awake. Material deemed "obscene" may still be prohibited at all times.

This doctrine has generally been held to apply only to the AM broadcast band (medium wave), FM broadcast band (VHF band II), and TV broadcast bands (VHF band I and band III, and UHF). It does not apply to cable TV, cable radio, satellite TV, satellite radio, or other forms of electronic media, because although they also use publicly owned airwaves, these are subscription services which the listener or viewer must explicitly request, and are subject to conditional access, analog scrambling, or digital encryption.

The origin of the name comes from the Federal Communications Commission's 1978 legal case against Pacifica Radio, when the U.S. Supreme Court used the term to justify the verdict against the broadcaster. The Federal Communications Commission v. Pacifica Foundation case is considered a landmark for American broadcasters.
