= Elsa Knight Thompson =

American journalist (1906–1983)

Elsa Knight Thompson (née Elsie Eloise Knight; April 6, 1906 – February 12, 1983) was an American radio documentary maker and broadcaster.

Knight Thompson was Public Affairs Director at Pacifica Radio's KPFA in the San Francisco Bay Area, from 1957 to the early 1970s. She later worked as KPFA's Program Director. Her documentary programs and interviews won numerous broadcasting awards. She was a pathfinder for women in broadcasting and a leading figure in the history of Pacifica Radio and KPFA. Her style of radio influenced generations of public broadcasters.

While at KPFA, Thompson produced programs on civil rights issues, the rise of the Black Panther Party and the Vietnam War, as well as her 1960 documentary on the House Un-American Activities Committee called Black Friday. She worked for the Pacific News Service in San Francisco from 1975 to 1979.

She was born in Bonners Ferry, Idaho, to Murel Bolden and Earl Knight. At the British Broadcasting Corporation in London during World War II, she headed the international desk of the program Radio Newsreel. Thompson was one of the first journalists to interview survivors of Nazi concentration camps.

She died at the age of 76 in Oakland, California.

== Famous quotations ==
"The truth is always left of center!"
