= Cinema of Haiti =

Cinema of Haiti (French: Cinéma d'Haïti) includes the films and filmmakers of Haiti. The Haitian diaspora is active in the industry. Oppressive dictators and economic struggles have limited production.

== History ==
On December 14, 1899, Joseph Filippi, a representative of the Lumiere cinema, made the first public screening at the Petit Séminaire while visiting the island. The next day he filmed a fire in Port-au-Prince. Films from the period of U.S. occupation of Haiti (1915–34) are in the Library of Congress; these depict Marines and official ceremonies. Other early movies filmed in Haiti depicting health care, agriculture, and scenes of social life (particularly carnival) are also in the Library of Congress and the Pathé-Ciné Library.

The first continuous film showings, after the visit of the Lumière brothers' representative, took place starting in 1907 at the Pétion-Ville Grand Hotel, and then starting in 1914 at the Parisiana located in Port-au-Prince's Champ de Mars. The Parisian was the first major cinema and theater (500 seats) which existed in the country. In 1933, the Eden Cinema opened in Cap-Haïtien. The Paramount in Port-au-Prince opened the following year, and the Rex Theater in 1935.

Radio pioneer Ricardo Widmaïer was also involved in Haitian cinema, and in the early 1950s he made newsreels that were filmed at the Paramount Cinema. In his laboratory in Port-au-Prince, he developed his 16 mm films in black and white and in color. He produced the film Moi, je suis belle with Edouard Guilbaud. Jean Dominique, the screenwriter, also lent his voice to the narration. The sound was done by Herby Widmaier who was then only 15 years old.

Although there is limited research and accurate information on Haiti's film history, several variety films were made before François Duvalier's ascendance in 1957. Emmanuel and Edouard Guilbaud made many films on political events and athletes, often under the direction of Ricardo Widmaier.

== Historiography ==
The historiography of Haitian cinema is very limited. It consists of only one double issue of the journal of the French Institute of Haiti Conjonction, released in 1983, devoted to film; a book by Arnold Antonin, published during the same year, entitled Matériel pour une préhistoire du cinéma haïtien ("Material for a prehistory of Haitian cinema"); and an article by the same author in the 1981 book Cinéma de l’Amérique latine (Cinema of Latin America) by Guy Hennebel and Alfonso Gumucio Dagrón.

== Films seen by Haitians ==
Local film production is limited, but Haitians go to the movies. In the 1960s, viewers had the choice of films produced by Italian and French directors. Over time and despite occasional shows by the French Institute, Hollywood cinema has taken over Haitian movie screens.

Throughout the Duvalier regime, strict surveillance was exercised over films, lest they convey revolutionary ideas. For example, Luis Buñuel's La fièvre monte à El Pao (Fever mounts in El Pao) was quickly removed from cinemas. At that time, westerns and films inspired by Chinese martial arts were the most frequent choices available to the public.

In the 1980s, the Maxence Elisée group appeared in the Haitian film market. This corporation has enabled the Caribbean Haitian public to access popular French films and French versions of American films. This group (now Leisure Ltd) dominates the distribution and exhibition of cinema, and Haiti has the most theaters in the country, including the three largest: the Imperial (5 screens), the Capitol (4 screens), the Rex Theater, and the Paramount.

== Haitian films ==
=== Local films ===
During the Duvalier dictatorship, there was little film production within the country. This was primarily caused by the country's extreme poverty and the technological and financial constraints of film production.

In the 28 years of the Duvalier dictatorship, only four films were produced. The first was the 1976 short film Map play net by Raphael Stines, a Creole version of Jean Cocteau's Le bel indifférent. The second was Olivia, a 1977 feature film by Bob Lemoine. The third was Rasul Labuchin's 1980 film Anita, which was very successful thanks to the short-lived "Ciné-Club" Point-de-Vue (Point of View). Olivia was shot on 35mm film, and the other two on 16mm. In 1980, the first Creole-language feature film "A la mise pou Rodrig" was released nationwide. It featured singer Rodrigue Milien, written, directed and produced by Claude L.C. Mancuso - it was shot on 16mm and blown up to 35 millimeters.

Many films have been made now since the fall of Duvalier, many of them by Haitian filmmaker Arnold Antonin.

=== Militant film and film of the diaspora ===
In the diaspora, there is a forceful cinema of denunciation and struggle against dictatorships and repression. Arnold Antonin is known for his documentary films, including Les Duvalier sur le banc des accusés (1973, 25mm, black and white) and Haïti le chemin de la liberté (1974, 120 mm, feature, black and white). The latter film, sponsored by the magazine Les Cahiers du Cinéma, elevated Haitian film to an international level and is still viewed as a cult film. Arnold Antonin's other films include:

- Les Duvalier condamnés (1975, 40 minutes, 16mm, black and white)
- Art naïf et répression en Haïti (1975, medium-length, color)
- Un tonton macoute peut-il être un poète? (1980, 16mm, 40 minutes, color)
- Le droit à la parole (1981, 20 minutes, 16mm, color)

Also of note is Paul Arcelin's feature-length documentary Canne amère (16mm, color), filmed in 1975 and released in 1983.

With the fall of Duvalier, a new activist cinema emerged. It no longer consists exclusively of documentaries but also includes dramatic films, like those of Raoul Peck, whose movies include:

- Haitian Corner (1989, 109 minutes, 16mm, color, drama)
- L'homme sur les quais (1992, 105 minutes, 35mm, color, drama; officially selected at the Cannes Film Festival in 1993)
- Desounen (1994, 52 minutes, 16mm, color)
- Lumumba, ou la mort du prophète (2000)

The semi-biographical film Lumumba was successfully released in Africa and the United States.

Other notable films include:

- Ayisyen leve kanpe (1982 short film directed by Haiti Film; color, documentary)
- Nou tout se refijye (1983 short film directed by Willy Exumé)
- Se mèt Kò (1990 short film; 16mm, color, directed by Patricia Benoit)

The Haitian filmmaker Roland Paret, who lives in Canada, has also directed many short films on various topics. In Paris, Michèle Lemoine and Elsie Hass are also notable. Most Haitian movies are made by directors of Haitian nationality or origin, but they are often financed by foreigners.

Haitian filmmakers making a name for themselves in Hollywood include Jean-Claude La Marre, director of Trapped: Haitian Nights, and award-winning filmmaker Romane Antoine Simon who directed films such as I Am Not For Sale: The Fight to End Human Trafficking, Blood Runs Thick, and Hybristophilia. Romane Simon is also the author of the best selling novel RED TO BLACK (The Power of Love).

=== Video and film ===
The creation and production of images in the social and economic conditions of Haiti often find a way into the media light, especially in video. Independent producers, outside of television which continues to produce very little, make shooting in video, feature films and documentaries in a number that far exceeds the film itself.

Arnold Antonin, since his return in 1986, made largely educational and corporate films, except for a short film about Port-au-Prince, entitled The Third World War Has Already Occurred (1996). Starting in 1999, he began conducting a series of documentary portraits depicting lower class workers as well as important figures in Haitian art such as Tiga, Cédor Albert Mangonès, Andre Pierre, Patrick Vilaire, and Marithou. He produced these films with the Center team Petion-Bolivar, including Oldy August (camera and editing) and Mathieu Painvier, production assistant. From a story by Gary Victor, he adapted the satirical film Piwouli and zenglendo in 2001.

Videographers work as producers or as camera operators and editors. Some of them also work as directors. Notable names include Mario Delatour Jean Fabius, Richard J. Arens, Claude Mancuso, Jean-Pierre Grasset, Richard Senecal, Rachel Magloire, Patrick Barth, Karl Lafontant, Romane Simon, Guy Cantave, Laurence Magloire, Jean Claude Bourjoly, Camille Moses, etc..

Jean-Gardy Bien-Aime's works include:

- Cape Town to the Front (1993; Arc-en-Ciel Video Production)
- Scars (1997; Arc-en-Ciel Video Production)
- Millionaire in error (2003)

Frederick Surprised:

- The people here
- Honey, I love you (1998)

It may also include a video produced by Raphael Stines, Kraze Lanfa with an actor in the popular farce Jessifra. This actor is popular with the public for his imitation of the accent considered colorful by those who live in the north of Haiti. Videos of his theatrical works—filmed without any attention to shooting or editing—have found success, especially in the diaspora.

Raphael Stines was also the director of a television series entitled Pè Toma and Bouqui nan Paradi, from part of Fouche. Mention also the fear of loving and Reginald Lubin Barricades Richard Senecal.

== Characteristics of film production ==
There is weak artistic and technical preparation in the Haitian film industry. Most technicians and artists, including actors, learned on the job. They are forced to solve technical problems, instead of dealing with creative problems. Professionalism is virtually absent. There is no Haitian legislation on cinema, and the state has shown no interest in film production.

There is only one film school in Haiti, the Ciné Institute.

In 2000 the Haitian filmmakers association was created with the most prominent filmmakers living in Haiti at the time and was presided first by Claude L.C. Mancuso and then by Arnold Antonin.

The Motion Picture Association of Haiti (MPAH) was founded in 2007 by Hans Patrick Domercant. Once a year, it invites various businesspeople, civic leaders, renowned Haitian actors, and Hollywood actors of Haitian descent to celebrate the advancement and past achievements of the Haitian movie industry.

Among the 2014 MPAH attendees were famous Haitian actors Bos Macel, Gracié, Frederik, and Papa Piè, Haitian-American filmmaker Hugues Gentillon, and Hollywood actor Cody Walker.

== Foreign films about Haiti ==
Many foreign films—both documentaries and dramatic works—have been made about Haiti. These include The Divine Horsemen, The Living Gods of Haiti (1963) by Maya Deyren and Les comédiens (The comedians) (1965) by Peter Glenville (British production), based on the novel by Graham Greene. The Golden Mistress( 1954) directed by Abner Biberman.

Films by the Cuban Institute of Art and Cinematographic Industry (ICAIC):

- Cumbite (aka Coumbite) (1964) directed by Tomas Gutierrez Alea of Cuba based on the novel Gouverneurs de la rosée by Jacques Roumain.
- Simparele (1974) by Humberto Solás with the Haitian singer Martha Jean-Claude
- Entre el cielo y la tierra (1979) by Manuel Octavio Gómez, also with Martha Jean-Claude

Documentaries on Haiti have been made by foreign directors including Jean-Marie Drot, Charles Najmann, Jonathan Demme, Rudy Stern, Kareen Kramer, Jorgen Leth, Jean-Daniel Lafond, Yves Langlois and Gerard Lechêne.

== Organizations ==
The Motion Picture Association of Haiti (MPAH) is a 501(c)(3) non-profit organization founded in 2007 by Hans Patrick Domercant to support the Haitian Movie industry. MPAH established an annual Haiti Movie Awards event honoring and celebrating Haitian filmmakers and actors. Among MPAH past honorees and guests are Hollywood actor Cody Walker and Hollywood actor Jimmy Jean-Louis.

== See also ==
- List of Haitian films
- Media of Haiti
- Cinema of the world
