= KCUR-FM =

Public radio station in Kansas City

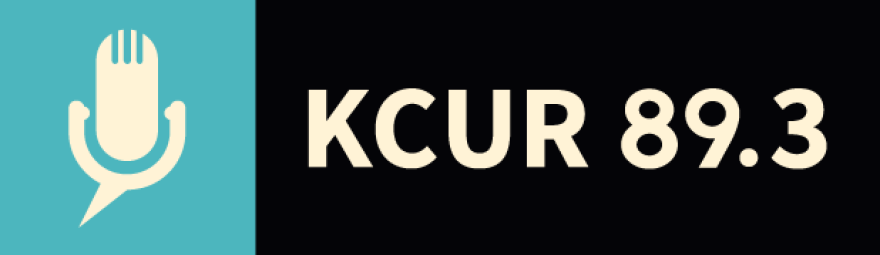
- Kansas City, Missouri; United States
- Broadcast area: Kansas City metropolitan area
- Frequency: 89.3 MHz (HD Radio)
- Branding: KCUR 89.3

Programming
- Format: News/talk (Public)
- Subchannels: HD2: Classical music (KWJC simulcast)
- Affiliations: National Public Radio; Public Radio Exchange; American Public Media

Ownership
- Owner: University of Missouri-Kansas City; (The Curators of the University of Missouri)
- Sister stations: KWJC

History
- First air date: October 21, 1957; 68 years ago
- Call sign meaning: Kansas City University Radio

Technical information
- Licensing authority: FCC
- Facility ID: 14738
- Class: C1
- ERP: 100,000 watts
- HAAT: 250 meters (820 ft)
- Transmitter coordinates: 39°4′59″N 94°28′49.8″W

Links
- Public license information: Public file; LMS
- Webcast: Listen live
- Website: www.kcur.org

KCUR-FM (89.3 MHz) is a public, listener-supported radio station in Kansas City, Missouri, broadcasting over the Kansas City metropolitan area and parts of Missouri and Kansas. It is a service of the University of Missouri-Kansas City, which also owns 91.9 KWJC. KCUR-FM airs mostly NPR and local news and information programming such as All Things Considered, Morning Edition and 1A, while KWJC plays classical music. Weekdays on KCUR-FM, a local hourlong talk show, Up to Date, is broadcast at 9 a.m.

KCUR-FM has an effective radiated power (ERP) of 100,000 watts, the maximum for most U.S. FM stations. The transmitter is off Stark Avenue near Missouri Route 78 in Kansas City.

== History ==
=== Educational radio ===
In the spring of 1956, C.J. Stevens, then Director of Radio and TV at the University of Kansas City (forerunner of UMKC), submitted a budget request for the establishment and operation of an educational FM radio station. This request was turned down. Stevens and Sam Scott then decided to raise money outside the university and, with the approval of then President McGrath, a modest fundraising campaign was undertaken and a separate FM fund was established.

KCUR-FM began broadcasting on October 21, 1957 from the third floor of Scofield Hall with a signal range of four miles, two full-time employees and a budget of $15,000 from the University. Wiring and setup of the station was done by student volunteers, including some from Rockhurst (Richard J. Allen and Gary Labowitz, who was an announcer/engineer the first two years). KCUR was the first university-licensed educational FM station in Missouri and the second FM station in Kansas City. The call letters came from the university's short name, "KCU".

=== Financial problems ===
In 1961, the University of Kansas City Board of Trustees decided to drop operation of KCUR from the 1962 budget along with the elimination of the intercollegiate athletic program. This was a time of financial problems for KCU, leading to its merger into the University of Missouri system a few years later. An Editorial in the Kansas City Times suggested several reasons why the university should reconsider its decision including, "In the community, it (KCUR) is a source of education, culture and pleasure."

The decision to eliminate funding for KCUR was reversed at the next meeting. In 1965 — two years after UKC became the University of Missouri-Kansas City — the station moved to 524 Pierce Street. The MU board approved purchase of $24,000 worth of transmitter equipment that more than doubled the station's coverage area, boosting its broadcasting power to 40,000 watts.

=== NPR affiliation ===
In 1970, KCUR was awarded a grant of $7,500 from the Corporation for Public Broadcasting for Community Service. A year later, it became a charter member and network affiliate of NPR. In 1976, KCUR-FM moved to 5327 Holmes and the signal was expanded to 100,000 watts.

In 1985, KCUR moved to its ongoing location in the Student Services Building at 4825 Troost. Over the next few years, the public radio programming was streamlined and most of the volunteers were either eliminated from on-air responsibilities or became employees of KCUR. The station began broadcasting 24 hours a day with the BBC World Service being heard in the overnight hours.

Previous logo

=== Classical music ===
In 1992, national and local news programming was added to the broadcast schedule, eliminating classical music during the day. These changes along with more sophisticated fundraising success enabled the station to increase its listening audience and local news staff.

On August 16, 2019, KCUR announced it had agreed to purchase KWJC 91.9 FM from William Jewell College in suburban Liberty, Missouri, for $2 million. On July 1, 2020, KCUR completed its purchase of KWJC and signed the station, Classical KC, on with a classical music format.

=== Association with University of Missouri-Kansas City ===
In 2025, the University of Missouri-Kansas City announced it would transfer management of KCUR and Classical KC to an independent nonprofit.

== Programming ==
KCUR is the host of The Midwest Newsroom, a partnership between the station, Iowa Public Radio, Nebraska Public Media News, STLPR and NPR that produces news for the region.

== See also ==
- 12th Street Jump
