= Kevin Pina =

Kevin Pina may refer to:

- Kevin Pina (journalist) (fl. 1985–present), American journalist
- Kevin Pina (footballer) (born 1997), Cape Verdean footballer
