= Alex Wise =

Alex Wise may refer to:

- Alex Wise (radio personality) (born c. 1968), American radio host and producer
- Alex Wise (archer) (born 2000), British archer
