= Veterans Against the War =

Veterans Against the War may refer to:

- Iraq Veterans Against the War
- Vietnam Veterans Against the War

== See also ==
- Veterans for Peace
