= FCC v. Pacifica Foundation =

1978 landmark US Supreme Court case

- Supreme Court of the United States

Argued April 18–19, 1978 Decided July 3, 1978
- Full case name: Federal Communications Commission v. Pacifica Foundation, et al.
- Citations: 438 U.S. 726 (more) 98 S. Ct. 3026; 57 L. Ed. 2d 1073; 1978 U.S. LEXIS 135; 43 Rad. Reg. 2d (P & F) 493; 3 Media L. Rep. 2553
- Argument: Oral argument

Case history
- Prior: Complaint granted, 56 F.C.C.2d 94 (1975); reversed, 556 F.2d 9 (D.C. Cir. 1977); cert. granted, 434 U.S. 1008 (1978).

Holding
- Because of the pervasive nature of broadcasting, it has less First Amendment protection than other forms of communication. The F.C.C. was justified in concluding that Carlin's "Filthy Words" broadcast, though not obscene, was indecent, and subject to restriction.

Court membership
- Chief Justice Warren E. Burger Associate Justices William J. Brennan Jr. · Potter Stewart; Byron White · Thurgood Marshall; Harry Blackmun · Lewis F. Powell Jr. William Rehnquist · John P. Stevens

Case opinions
- Majority: Stevens (Parts I, II, III, and IV-C), joined by Burger, Blackmun, Powell, Rehnquist
- Concurrence: Stevens (Parts IV-A and IV-B), joined by Burger, Rehnquist
- Concurrence: Powell, joined by Blackmun
- Dissent: Brennan, joined by Marshall
- Dissent: Stewart, joined by Brennan, White, Marshall

Laws applied
- U.S. Const. amend. I; 18 U.S.C. § 1464

Federal Communications Commission v. Pacifica Foundation, 438 U.S. 726 (1978), is a landmark decision of the United States Supreme Court that upheld the ability of the Federal Communications Commission (FCC) to regulate indecent content sent over the broadcast airwaves.

== Background ==
On the afternoon of October 30, 1973, radio station WBAI in New York City, owned by the nonprofit Pacifica Foundation, aired a program about societal attitudes toward language and included the monologue "Seven Words You Can Never Say on Television" by comedian George Carlin, from his 1972 album Class Clown. The broadcast included Carlin's recitation of the words "shit", "piss", "fuck", "cunt", "cocksucker", "motherfucker", and "tits".

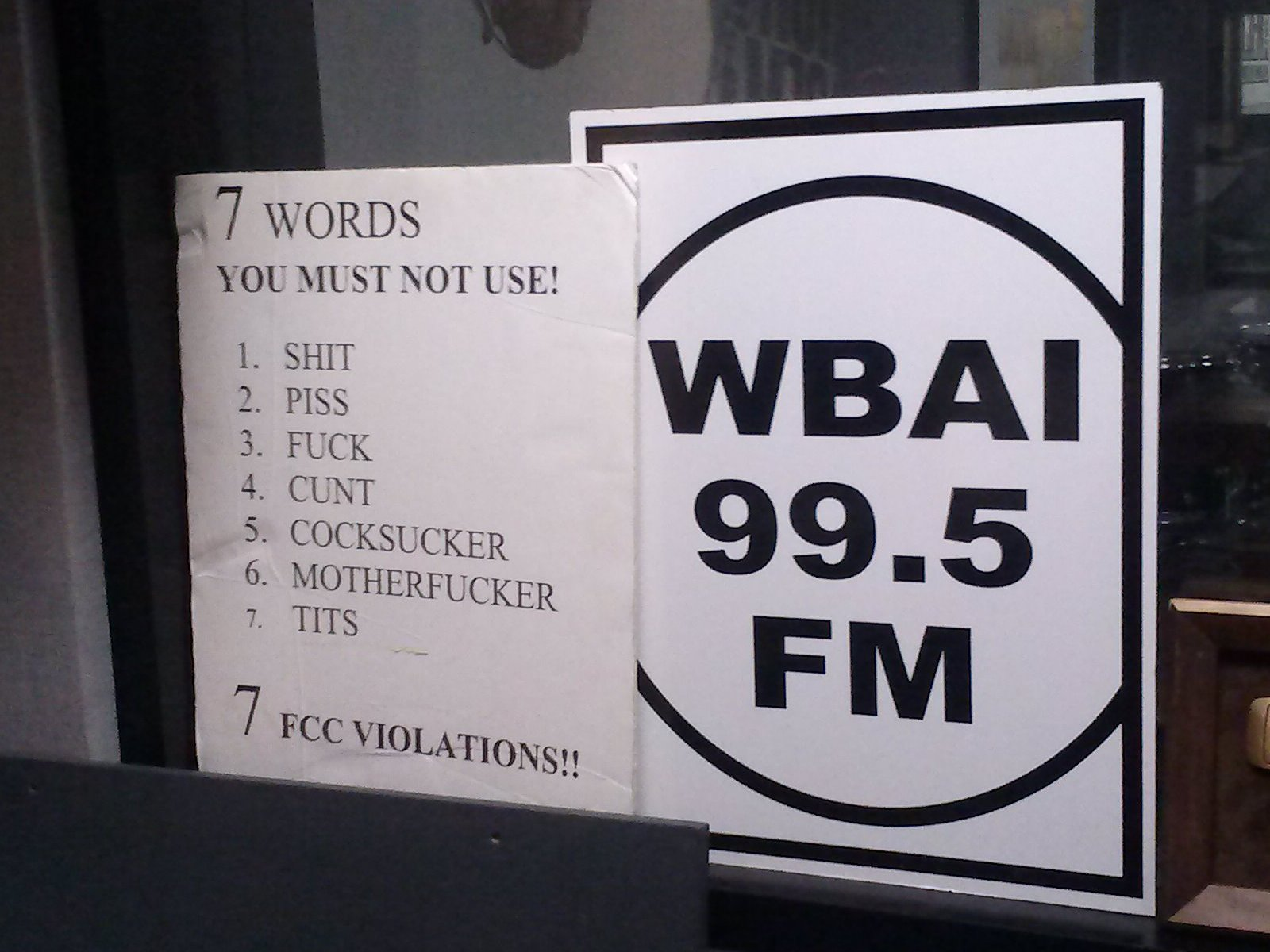
In reference to this case, a poster in a WBAI broadcast studio warns radio broadcasters against using the seven dirty words.

John Douglas, an active member of Morality in Media, filed a complaint with the Federal Communications Commission (FCC) claiming that he had heard the broadcast on his car radio while driving with his young son, and that the content was inappropriate for minors per the FCC's rules on indecency over the public broadcast airwaves. Douglas also noted that the material should not have been broadcast during the daytime (it was approximately 2:00 pm) when minors were more likely to be listening, per the FCC's rule requiring adult-oriented programming to only be broadcast during late-night hours.

The FCC forwarded Douglas's complaint to Pacifica Foundation for comment. The foundation replied that the program was intended to be educational, addressing public attitudes toward language, and that Carlin was "a significant social satirist" who "like Twain and Sahl before him, examines the language of ordinary people... using words to satirize as harmless and essentially silly our attitudes towards those words." Pacifica also noted that it had received no other public complaints about the broadcast.

In February 1975, the FCC issued a declaratory order stating that Pacifica and WBAI "could have been the subject of administrative sanctions." While no such sanctions were imposed, the FCC recorded the incident in the station's file for later consideration if there were customer complaints about the station in the future or if its broadcasting license was up for renewal. The order noted that regulations on indecent broadcast content had indeed been violated by WBAI. The order also explained that the Carlin routine was "patently offensive" and "deliberately broadcast" at a time when minors could have been listening, which was forbidden by the Communications Act of 1934.

Pacifica Foundation challenged the declaratory order, on First Amendment grounds, in the Circuit Court for the District of Columbia. In March 1977, the circuit court reversed the FCC's order against Pacifica, ruling it to be censorship of a type that was prohibited by the Communications Act of 1934. The court also held that the order was overbroad by failing to define the public interest that it sought to serve, beyond the poorly defined protection of an unknown number of children in the audience, while confusing the definition of obscenity (unacceptable for all audiences) as opposed to content that is merely indecent (acceptable for audiences other than minors).

Given the apparently conflicting provisions of the 1934 Act that were raised in the circuit court ruling, the FCC appealed to the U.S. Supreme Court. The Supreme Court accepted the case in 1978 and resolved to reconcile the Act's restrictions on indecent broadcasting content with its prohibition of censorship.

== Supreme Court opinion ==
The Supreme Court primarily addressed the matter of whether government regulation of broadcasting content comports with the free speech rights of broadcast operators under the First Amendment. The high court ruled 5–4 in favor of the FCC, holding that the Carlin routine was "indecent but not obscene". Therefore, the Commission could not ban such content outright, but it could restrict broadcasts to certain times of day. This was because the Commission had the authority to shield children from potentially offensive material, and to ensure that unwanted speech does not intrude on the privacy of one's home.

In light of First Amendment concerns, the high court held that government regulation of broadcasting content, when in the form of a partial restriction but not a total ban, does not constitute "censorship" within the meaning of the applicable statute. This is because of the "uniquely pervasive" nature of the broadcast airwaves, which are "uniquely accessible to children". The court held that these two concerns were sufficient to "justify special treatment of indecent broadcasting", thereby allowing the FCC to sanction broadcasters for airing inappropriate content that violates the provisions of the Communications Act of 1934. Although use of the seven dirty words would be protected by the First Amendment in some contexts, to air them on broadcast radio when children would be likely to be listening was "like a pig in the parlor instead of the barnyard". Thus, the Commission's warning to Pacifica about broadcasting the Carlin routine in the afternoon was found to be an acceptable regulatory action.

If the Carlin routine had included obscenity, the FCC could have banned it from the broadcast airwaves outright. Since the routine was merely indecent (unacceptable for some audiences but acceptable for others), the FCC could not ban the content but could restrict it to certain times of day. This became known as the FCC's safe harbor rule.

The ruling gave the FCC broad leeway to determine what constituted indecency in different contexts. Conversely, it would be acceptable for Pacifica or any other radio station to broadcast the Carlin routine, or any similarly indecent material, outside of the daytime safe harbor hours when vulnerable audiences like children are more likely to be listening.

== Impact ==
The Pacifica ruling is often cited as one of the most important precedents in American broadcasting law and the U.S. government's ability to regulate mass media content. The case is also cited for clarifying the potential conflict between the government's interest in protecting audiences and a broadcaster's First Amendment rights, though the Supreme Court's interpretation is sometimes criticized for its inconsistency and inability to adapt to new media technologies or trends in popular content. The case is also an important precedent for determining the differences between obscene and indecent content and appropriate regulatory reactions to them.

George Carlin has been credited for his role in this turning point for the law. In 1997, Pacifica Radio host Larry Bensky prefaced an interview with Carlin by saying: "George Carlin, you're a very unusual guest for Pacifica Radio. You're probably the only person in the United States that we don't have to give The Carlin Warning to about which words you can't say on this program, because it's named after you."

Despite its victory in Pacifica, the FCC at first used its new safe harbor regulatory powers sparingly. In the 1990s, however, the FCC ramped up sanctions for indecent broadcasts. By the early 2000s, the Commission began to levy more sanctions with higher dollar amounts—with fines of up to $500,000 for some offenses. Such actions have raised accusations of selective enforcement.
