= Richard Sénécal =

Haitian filmmaker

- Born: 1 April 1967 (age 58); Port-au-Prince, Haiti
- Occupation: Filmmaker

Richard Sénécal (born 1 April 1967) is a Haitian filmmaker. He is known for directing and producing numerous Haitian films.

The Haitian Times described his film Barikad as a classic that examines Haiti's class structure. The European Union funded an outdoor screening of his film Cousines in Haiti in 2011 for a European Festival. It received two awards at the Brooklyn International Film Festival.

In 2011, Malpasse was a film planned about Haitian students in the Dominican Republic to be directed by Sénécal. In his 2016 book on Haiti, Paul Clammer called the film I Love You Anne one of the country's most popular "in recent years".

== Filmography ==
- Chère Cathereine (1997), co-cinematographer
- The New Adventures
- Barikad (2002)
- I Love You Anne (2002), starring comedian Tonton Bicha
- Cousins (2006)
- We Love You Anne (2013)
- Gossip Phone (Telefòn Jouda) (2017), television series
- Birth of a Diaspora (Naissance d'une diaspora) (2019), a documentary about Haitian refugees in Chile

== See also ==
- Cinema of Haiti
- Culture of Haiti
