= Larry Bensky =

American journalist (1937–2024)

- Bensky in 2005
- Born: May 1, 1937; New York City, U.S.
- Died: May 19, 2024 (aged 87); Berkeley, California, U.S.
- Occupation: Journalist

Larry Bensky (May 1, 1937 – May 19, 2024) was an American literary and political journalist with experience in both print and broadcast media, as well as a teacher and political activist. He is known for his work with Pacifica Radio station KPFA-FM in Berkeley, California, and for the nationally-broadcast hearings he anchored for the Pacifica network.

A native of New York City, Bensky graduated from Stuyvesant High School in 1954 and, with departmental honors, from Yale University, where he was managing editor of the Yale Daily News.

== Journalism career ==
Prior to his broadcasting career (and continuing throughout), Bensky worked as a print journalist and editor. He worked at the Minneapolis Star-Tribune after college, while attending graduate school at the University of Minnesota. He then worked as an editor at Random House, before moving to France, where he was Paris editor of The Paris Review from 1964 to 1966. He then returned to New York as an editor of The New York Times Sunday Book Review, and also wrote daily book reviews. His views on the war in Vietnam were not well received by editors of the Times, and several of his reviews and features were rejected. In 1968, he moved to the San Francisco Bay Area to take over as managing editor of the radical, anti-war publication, Ramparts magazine, working closely with editor-in-chief Robert Scheer.

After leaving Ramparts, Bensky worked for a time at San Francisco radio station KSAN-FM, before joining the staff of KPFA-FM in Berkeley. In 1972, he anchored and produced Pacifica Radio's coverage of the Democratic and Republican national conventions, both held in Miami, along with the attendant massive anti-war protests, dubbed "The Siege of Miami".

Bensky served as station manager for KPFA from 1974 to 1977. After returning to KSAN as a news anchor, reporter, and talk show host, he narrowly missed accompanying Congressman Leo Ryan to investigate conditions at the Jonestown colony in Guyana in 1978, which resulted in Ryan and four journalists being shot to death on an airstrip, precipitating the mass murder-suicide of over 900 people. In the early 1980s, Bensky turned his attention to the revolutions and American interventions in Nicaragua and El Salvador. He produced the PBS documentary, "Nicaragua: These Same Hands" in 1980.

=== National affairs correspondent ===
Best known as national affairs correspondent for Pacifica Radio from 1987 to 1998, Bensky covered numerous national and international events for Pacifica, including the Iran–Contra hearings in 1987, the confirmation hearings for four Supreme Court justices, the 1990 elections in Nicaragua, and numerous demonstrations and protests in Washington, D.C., and elsewhere. He anchored Pacifica's live coverage of the 9/11 Commission hearings, and co-anchored Pacifica's coverage of the 2004 Democratic and Republican conventions, as well as the Presidential debates. He was anchor for Pacifica's extensive coverage of the post-2004 election controversy in Ohio, as well as several Congressional hearings about the misuse of executive power in the Bush administration.

Bensky retired as host of a weekly two-hour radio talk show, Sunday Salon, originating at KPFA in Berkeley. Among his guests were numerous writers and politicians including Paul Wellstone, Paul Krugman, Manning Marable, Bernie Sanders, Jane Smiley, Calvin Trillin, and Gary Shteyngart.

Bensky wrote for The Nation, magazine, and was a regular contributor to the Los Angeles Times Sunday Book Review. A longtime resident of Berkeley, he was a political writer and columnist for the East Bay Express for fifteen years.

Bensky also appeared as a guest journalist on C-SPAN, CNN, The Today Show, and The MacNeil/Lehrer NewsHour, as well as on San Francisco KQED-FM's "Forum" and KQED-TV's "This Week in Northern California." In addition, he was founding managing editor (1999–2000) of the web site Mediachannel.org.

Bensky won the prestigious George Polk Award for his coverage of Iran–Contra, and won five Gold Reel awards from the National Federation of Community Broadcasters. He won a career achievement award from the Society of Professional Journalists, and the Golden Gadfly award from Media Alliance.

== Educator and activist ==
In addition to his work as a journalist, Bensky spent twelve years teaching broadcast journalism classes at Stanford, and courses in mass communication, journalism, broadcasting, and political science at California State University, East Bay (CSUEB) in Hayward, California. He also taught media criticism and analysis at Berkeley City College and political science at CSUEB.

Bensky was a political activist from the 1960s onwards, working with nuclear disarmament and anti-war groups in New York City, Paris, and San Francisco during the Vietnam War. In 1968, he signed the "Writers and Editors War Tax Protest" pledge, vowing to refuse tax payments in protest against the Vietnam War. He co-designed and wrote numerous successful direct mail appeals for modern progressive organizations, including Greenpeace, the Sierra Club, and the United Farm Workers. He was a devout pacifist and an outspoken opponent of capital punishment.

== Retirement and death ==
After retiring from regular broadcasting in 2007, Bensky returned to a lifetime avocation, French language and literature. He was producer and host of "Radio Proust," a web site which he developed as a fellow of the Bard College Center. He also developed and was teaching classes about Proust for the Osher Lifelong Learning Institute at the University of California, Berkeley.

Bensky was married and had one daughter. He died in Berkeley on May 19, 2024, at the age of 87.

== Sources ==
- Lilley, Sasha KPFA Radio, May, 2007.
