= Bonnie Simmons =

American radio personality

Bonnie Simmons is a California based radio personality. Audio director of the Rock and Roll Hall of Fame, she is also a band manager, currently managing or having managed in the past Cake, Noe Venable and Etienne de Rocher.

Simmons started at KSAN in 1968 as the record librarian, became music librarian, music director, on-air DJ, and by 1975, was the program director.

Simmons is executive director of the Bill Graham Memorial Foundation.

Simmons spent several years working as a sandwich-maker at Ozzie’s Soda Fountain in Berkeley.

Simmons runs the transport department for Hardly Strictly Bluegrass.

Simmons volunteers for The Bonnie Simmons Show at 8:00 PM Pacific Time on Thursdays on KPFA.

Simmons was inducted into the Rock Radio Hall of Fame in the "Legends of Rock Radio-Programming" category for her work at KSAN in 2014.
