= Kevin Pina (journalist) =

American journalist and filmmaker

Kevin Pina is an American journalist, filmmaker and educator. Pina also serves as a Country Expert on Haiti for the Varieties of Democracy project sponsored by the University of Notre Dame Center for Research Computing, the University of Gothenburg Department of Political Science, and the Helen Kellogg Institute for International Studies.

== Human rights in Haiti ==
Pina is known for his reporting focusing on human rights abuses in Haiti following the ouster of Jean-Bertrand Aristide on February 29, 2004, and the installation of the interim government of Gerard Latortue and Boniface Alexandre in March 2004. Pina reported on events in Haiti between 2003 and 2006 as a Special Correspondent for the radio program, Flashpoints, heard on KPFA – the flagship station of Pacifica Radio based in Berkeley, California.

Pina's first Haiti documentary, Haiti: Harvest of Hope, focused on the formation of Aristide's Lavalas political movement, the military coup of 1991 and Aristide's eventual return from exile in October 1994. The Haitian Creole version of Haiti: Harvest of Hope was narrated by Haitian poet Jean-Claude Martineau and premiered in Haiti on Haitian Mother's Day in May 1995. The English version is narrated by the actor Roscoe Lee Brown and was released for distribution in the U.S. in 1997.

In early January 1999, Pina moved to Port-au-Prince where he lived and worked for the next seven years. He was the first journalist to write that paramilitary forces of the former Haitian military and the Front for the Advancement and Progress of Haïti (FRAPH), operating in the neighboring Dominican Republic, were being used as part of a larger strategy to oust the government of President Jean-Bertrand Aristide in April 2003.

Pina was arrested in Haiti on September 9, 2005 and held in jail for three days after attempting to videotape a search by Judge Jean Pérs Paul in the church of prisoner of conscience Father Gérard Jean-Juste. Pina later said he had gone to St. Claire's parish because he had received information that the judge intended to plant weapons in Jean-Juste's rectory to justify holding the priest in prison.

After Haiti: Harvest of Hope, Pina released a second video entitled Haiti: The UNtold Story. The film chronicles human rights abuses by the Haitian police and a military assault on July 6, 2005 by United Nations forces where residents accuse them of massacring civilians in the impoverished neighborhood of Cité Soleil. Haiti: The UNtold Story was an earlier version of Pina's latest documentary, Haiti: We must kill the Bandits, subsequently re-edited for a final release in 2009 at the Bahamas International Film Festival.

Pina's film credits and videography include El Salvador: In the Name of Democracy (1985), Berkeley in the Sixties (1990), Amazonia: Voices from the Rainforest (1990), Haiti: Harvest of Hope (1997), Haiti: The UNtold Story (2005) and HAITI: We Must Kill the Bandits (2007).
