= Pierre-Louis Dieufaite =

Haitian actor (1983–2014)

- At the MPAH awards, in Boston, MA, USA
- Born: Jude Dieuly Pierre-Louis; 13 October 1983; Port-au-Prince, Haiti
- Died: 6 November 2014 (aged 31); Port-au-Prince, Haiti
- Cause of death: Assassination by gunshot

Pierre-Louis Dieufaite (born Jude Dieuly Pierre-Louis; 13 October 1983 – 6 November 2014) was a Haitian actor, best known for his supporting role in the award-winning film Love Me Haiti, the first and only film he ever appeared in. Dieufaite, known as "Jude" by friends, was among the many people killed in Haiti by gangs and thieves during the month of November 2014.

== Death ==
Dieufaite was assassinated along with his best buddy Frédely Desrosiers, the nephew of Haitian National Police (PNH) chief inspector Garry Desrosiers.
