= Public Radio Exchange =

Nonprofit redistributor of radio programs

- Type: Public radio network
- Country: United States
- Broadcast area: Nationwide
- Headquarters: Cambridge, Massachusetts, U.S.

History
- Founded: September 2003; 23 years ago

Coverage
- Availability: Global

Links
- Website: www.prx.org

The Public Radio Exchange (PRX) is a non-profit web-based platform for digital distribution, review, and the licensing of radio programs. The organization is the largest on-demand catalogue of public radio programs available for broadcast and internet use.

== History ==
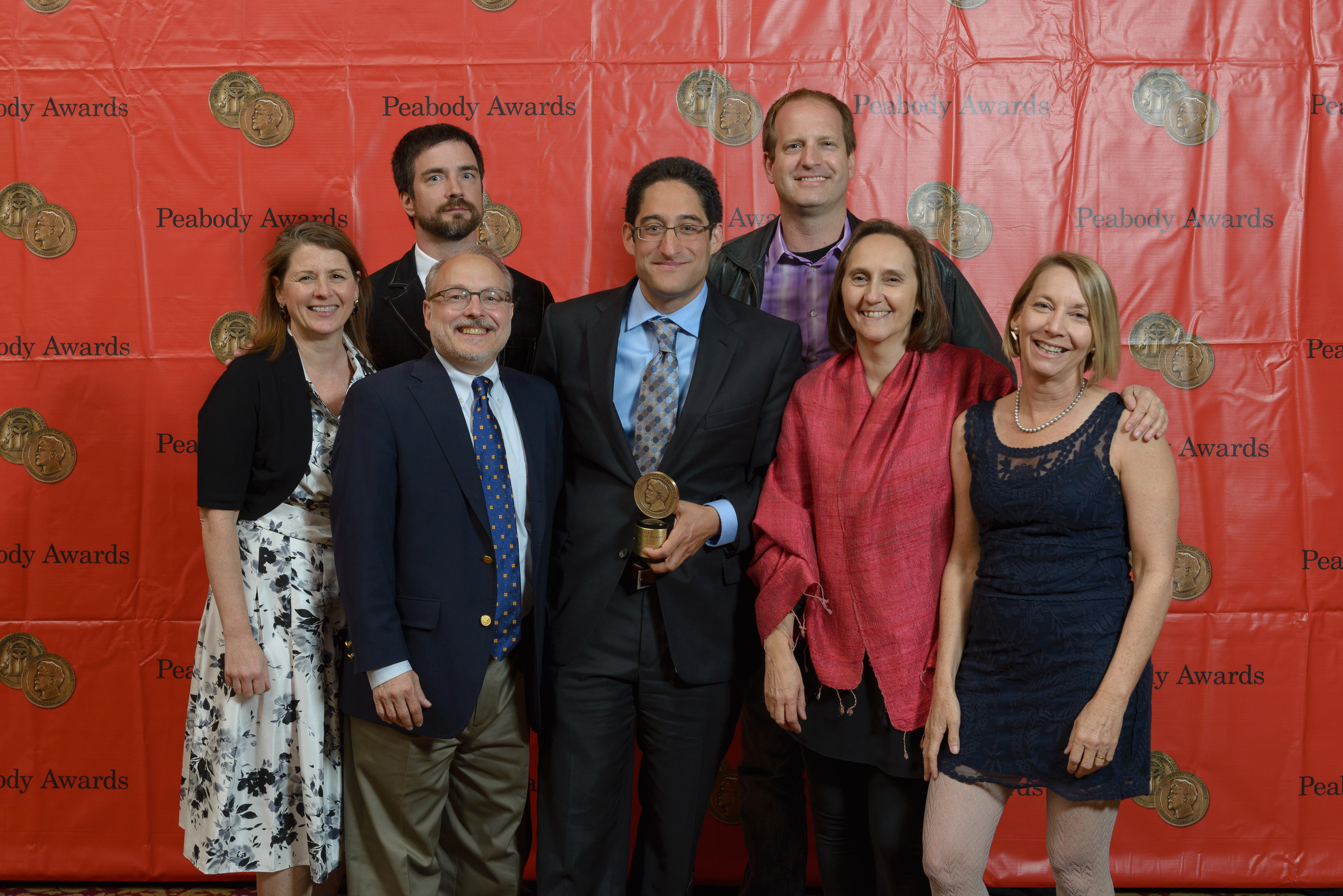
A Peabody Award for Reveal: The VA's Opiate Overload. L to R: Kerri Hoffman, Ben Adair, John Barth, Aaron Glantz, Jake Shapiro, Susanne Reber and Amy Pyle (2015)

The PRX site and services launched in September 2003 after a two-year planning, research, and development phase supported by the Corporation for Public Broadcasting, the National Endowment for the Arts, and the Ford Foundation. PRX received additional support from the NTIA Technology Opportunities Program, the MacArthur Foundation, the Open Society Institute, the Surdna Foundation, and Google Grants. PRX offices are located in Cambridge, Massachusetts.

On February 28, 2007, PRX and the Corporation for Public Broadcasting announced the Public Radio Talent Quest. It was an open search for new public radio talent, allowing producers to produce a pilot show for public radio. Finalists were to be chosen after a five-round competition voted on by fans, public radio professionals and celebrity judges. On May 14, the first round of submissions ended with 1,452 entries. As of May 22, 2007, the Public Radio Talent Quest site had over 14,600 registered users.

On April 9, 2008, the MacArthur Foundation selected PRX as one of its 2008 recipients of the MacArthur Award for Creative and Effective Institutions. In late November of that year, PRX soft-launched PRX 3.0. The launch included their Remix Radio project, which provides a sampling of the content available for licensing on the site.

On January 1, 2009, PRX, Inc became a Massachusetts 501c3 non-profit corporation. Previously PRX had been a project area of the Station Resource Group, a Maryland non-profit. On January 28, PRX Remix was added to XM Satellite Radio on channel 136. Later that year, on July 19, PRX launched the Public Radio Player 2.0, an iPhone app for public radio developed by PRX, NPR, and other public radio partners, and funded by the Corporation for Public Broadcasting. On August 11, PRX was included in CPB's agreement with SoundExchange through 2015 as a covered public radio entity for music webcasting royalties.

In 2010 PRX launched two iPhone apps: the This American Life app on February 1 and the WBUR Boston app on July 7. That same year, PRX won a Peabody Award for The Moth Radio Hour. PRX was also announced as a winner of the 2010 Knight News Challenge for Story Exchange, a crowdfunding journalism project, on June 16. On September 8, 2010, PRX announced $2.7M in new funding from the Corporation for Public Broadcasting, the MacArthur Foundation, and the Ford Foundation.

On December 8, 2011, PRX announced $2.5M in funding from Knight Foundation to create the Public Media Accelerator. In May 2014, PRX received a Peabody Award for the Reveal show "The VA's Opiate Overload".

On August 15, 2018, PRX and Public Radio International announced they would merge, though both networks would maintain separate identities and programming. The PRI brand was retired the following year.

== PRX Remix ==
Formerly known as Public Radio Remix. As of 2025, one radio station, WREM in Canton, New York, airs a full-time schedule of programming from PRX, branded as Public Radio Remix. (A second, KPBZ in Spokane, Washington, formerly did until switching to a jazz format.) Both stations are owned by the same organizations as their markets' primary National Public Radio affiliates. PRX Remix also airs on Sirius XM Channel 123.

Several other public radio stations air some, but not all, Public Radio Exchange programming in their schedules.

== Numbers ==
On May 22, 2007, PRX had 12,167 available radio pieces, 28,149 members, including 445 radio stations, and 2,782 individual producers.

== Programs distributed by PRX ==
Regular series distributed by PRX include:

- 12th Street Jump
- 99% Invisible
- American Parlor Songbook
- American Routes
- Afropop Worldwide
- As It Happens
- Big Picture Science
- Bioneers
- Broadway Bound
- Classical 24
- Day 6
- Echoes
- Exploring Music
- Folk Alley
- Global Village
- Hearts of Space
- HowSound
- Inside Europe from Deutsche Welle
- Israel Story
- Jazz After Hours
- Jazz with David Basse
- Ken Rudin's Political Junkie
- L.A. Theatre Works
- Latino USA
- Live Wire Radio
- Living on Earth
- Meditative Story
- Milk Street Radio
- The Moth Radio Hour
- New Letters on the Air
- On Being
- On Story
- Open Source
- Ozark Highlands Radio
- Philosophy Talk
- Pittsburgh Symphony Orchestra
- Planetary Radio
- Podcast Playlist
- Q
- The Record Shelf
- Reveal Weekly
- Says You!
- The Score with Edmund Stone
- Sea Change Radio
- Selected Shorts
- Skeptoid
- Sound Opinions
- Think
- This American Life (self-distributed, but uses PRX to deliver shows to stations)
- To the Best of Our Knowledge
- The Tobolowsky Files
- Ultima Thule
- Up Close and Acoustic
- A Way with Words
- The World
- Zorba Paster on Your Health

=== Accolades ===
| Year | Award | Category | Nominee(s) | Result | Ref. |
|---|---|---|---|---|---|
| 2022 | Peabody Awards | Podcast & Radio | Kabul Falling | Nominated | |
