= Winter Soldier: Iraq & Afghanistan =

Testimony from veterans against U.S. deployment in the Middle East

Winter Soldier: Iraq and Afghanistan was an event at which more than 200 U.S. military veterans and active duty soldiers, as well as Iraqi and Afghan civilians, provided accounts of their experiences in Iraq and Afghanistan. The event was inspired by the Winter Soldier Investigation of 1971. It was organized by Iraq Veterans Against the War, and held from March 13 to March 16, 2008, timed for the fifth anniversary of the 2003 invasion of Iraq, at the National Labor College in Silver Spring, Maryland.

== Media coverage ==
The event was covered by The Washington Post, The Boston Globe, the Boston Herald, BBC World, Newsday, Democracy Now!, Stars and Stripes, The Real News, Slate, and Salon.com.

The Pacifica Radio network suspended regular programming for three days in order to air a live broadcast of the proceedings from March 14 through March 16, 2008, co-anchored by journalist Aaron Glantz, who has reported extensively on the Iraq War and its effects on veterans. Haymarket Books published a book of testimony from the event, Winter Soldier Iraq and Afghanistan: Eyewitness Accounts of the Occupations, co-authored by Glantz.

Aside from alternative media, coverage outside the United States was much greater than within the United States. Fairness and Accuracy in Reporting criticized the U.S. media, particularly the New York Times, for its lack of coverage, writing that, "given the common media rhetoric of 'supporting the troops'...to ignore these same troops when they speak out about the horrors of the war is unconscionable". New York Times public editor Clark Hoyt responded that the paper "had not been aware of the group or its meeting", but that even if it had been, it would not have reported on "charges and counter-charges at home by organizations with strongly held political viewpoints about the war".
