= Lewis Hill (Pacifica Radio) =

American public radio personality (1919–1957)

Lewis Hill (May 1, 1919 – August 1, 1957) was a co-founder of KPFA, the first listener-supported radio station in the United States, and the Pacifica Radio network.

He was born in Kansas City, Kansas, on May 1, 1919. His father was an attorney who made his fortune by brokering a deal to sell an oil company to J.P. Morgan. His mother's brother was Frank Phillips, builder of Phillips Petroleum. Lewis was sent to Wentworth Military Academy in Lexington, Missouri, because he was too bright for the public school. According to his widow, he "despised" his time at military school, but he completed his first two years of college there and also was the Missouri State doubles tennis champion. He then transferred to Stanford University.

While studying at Stanford in 1937, his interest in Quakerism led him to a belief in pacifism. As a conscientious objector, Hill served in Civilian Public Service during World War II. In 1945, Hill resigned from his job as a Washington, D.C., correspondent and moved to Berkeley, California.

In 1949 he established KPFA. To support the station financially, he founded the Pacifica Foundation. He served as Pacifica's head until his suicide (during a period of failing health from spinal arthritis) in 1957.
