= Hugues Gentillon =

Haitian film director and scientist

- Born: Hugues Gentillon; December 17, 1974 (age 51); Port-au-Prince, Haiti
- Education: Academy of Art University, Medical University of Lodz, Miami Dade College, University of Florida, Collège Roger Anglade
- Occupations: Filmmaker, medical researcher, conceptual artist, philanthropist
- Years active: 2011–present
- Notable work: Love Me Haiti, A Place To Coexist : YUGY
- Awards: MPAH Best Short Film 2014, INTERSTUDENT 2014: Best Int'l Student in Poland

Hugues Gentillon (born December 17, 1974) is a Haitian film director, screenwriter, producer, and scientist. He is the founder of Yugy Pictures Entertainment, a film production company based in the United States.

== Biography ==
Gentillon was born on December 17, 1974, in Port-au-Prince, Haiti to Haitian parents. As both his parents were entrepreneurs, he attended several private schools in Haiti until graduating from high school, when he left the country to attend university in the United States. After initially studying at Miami Dade College and University of Florida in Florida, he transferred to several other universities in North America and Europe, including New York Film Academy, Academy of Art University, Medical University of Lodz, and Université libre de Bruxelles, eventually graduating with a Master of Fine Arts degree. In 2014 he screened his MFA thesis film Love Me Haiti at several film festivals, including Festival de Cannes, Zanzibar International Film Festival (ZIFF), Boston Cinema/Motion Pictures Association of Haiti (MPAH), and Bahamas International Film Festival. The film won Gentillon several awards, including the 2014 Interstudent special award and the 2014 MPAH award for Best Short Film. A year later Gentillon attended the Festival de Cannes 2015, where he promoted and pre-marketed his film The Pearl of Wisdom, a fictional film loosely inspired by a series of events that took place during the Age of Reason (1600-1800).

== See also ==
- Cinema of Haiti
- List of Haitian films
