= Love Me Haiti =

- Love Me Haiti poster
- Directed by: Hugues Gentillon
- Written by: Hugues Gentillon; Alexander Stuart; Joyce Mccauley-Benner; Joe Vetromile
- Story by: Hugues Gentillon
- Produced by: Hugues Gentillon
- Starring: Aurelia Khazan; Pierre-Louis Dieufaite; Deoud Gentillon; François Meknes; Jean-Mary Volney
- Cinematography: Brian C. Miller Richard
- Edited by: George Valdieu
- Music by: Johan Allerfeldt
- Production company: Yugy Pictures Entertainment
- Distributed by: Gonella Productions
- Release date: February 2014 (Clermont-Ferrand)
- Countries: USA, Haiti, Poland, Sweden
- Languages: Haitian, French, English, Latin

Love Me Haiti is a 2014 fictional short film directed by Hugues Gentillon. Love Me Haiti co-stars Aurelia Khazan, Pierre-Louis Dieufaite, Deoud Gentillon, and François Meknes. The script was written by Gentillon, Alexander Stuart, Joyce Mccauley-Benner, and Joe Vetromile. Love Me Haiti was recorded in Port-au-Prince, Haiti. The film won the 2014 Haiti's Oscar for Best Short Film. Love Me Haiti also won Best Interpretation for the Dikalo Peace Award with actress Aurelia Khazan for bringing the character Marie Forstner to life. The young actress collected the prize at the prestigious Palais des Festivals et des Congrès in Cannes, France. The award was co-presented by Nord-Sud Développement and UNESCO.

Love Me Haiti is Gentillon's Master of Fine Art thesis at the Academy of Art University (AAU), located in San Francisco, California, USA. The film has two versions: a 14-minute thesis version submitted to AAU School of Motion Pictures and Television in late 2013 and a 9-minute theatrical version completed in November 2014.

== Plot ==
In so few minutes, Love Me Haiti mirrors 21st century geo-political corruption at its best. The film does it suspensefully by presenting the life of a couple: two doctors who naively think humanitarian medicine is about treating those in needs, having divine faith and hoping for a cure but soon find themselves fighting something beyond belief - a criminal injustice system in a decaying world.

In simple words, the film twistfully illustrates how life is a bitch.

== Production ==
In January 2015, after Gentillon won the Interstudent contest, some Polish news media, lost-in-translation, mistakenly reported that he produced Love Me Haiti while he was a graduate student at the Strzemiński Academy of Art Łódź (ASP Łódź). The truth is Gentillon hired actors and crew members and rented filmmaking equipment from ASP Łódź and from the Leon Schiller National Higher School of Film, Television and Theatre in Łódź (PWSFTviT). He was further assisted by staff of the Promotion Office at the Medical University of Łódź, the Film Commission of Łódź, the Mayor Office of Łódź, to recruit extras and to find locations to produce other AAU films, among which are The Door (2013), Agro Production (2012), and Lakay (2011).

Nonetheless, Gentillon's filmmaking education and most of the financial support to produce Love Me Haiti came from the San Francisco's Academy of Art University and the U.S. Department of Education. The misinformation arises from the fact that Gentillon attended AAU while studying medicine at the Medical University of Łódź in Poland, and both AAU and ASP, are locally known as Academy of Art. Adding up to the confusion, Love Me Haiti development and post-production were done while Gentillon was in the city of Łódź, and its pre-production and production took place in Haiti. During the winter 2012, Gentillon traveled to Paris, New York, Atlanta, Miami, and Port-au-Prince to audition actors. Early 2013, he assembled an international team of filmmakers and recorded the film in Port-au-Prince. There Gentillon recruited his cousin Hugue-Robert Marsan as executive producer. Marsan and his multi-media company GraphCity supported Gentillon by providing him additional filmmaking equipment. Leson Messilie started working on set construction before the team arrived in Haiti. So was Mario Calixte with art direction. He made the paintings for Love Me Haiti set decoration and for the film poster art.

Gentillon's MFA thesis film Love Me Haiti was indeed done extramurally but under the sole academic aegis of the Academy of Art University, located in California and which also awarded his MFA in motion pictures and television.

To piece this enigmatic film production puzzle together, the ideas which gave birth to Love Me Haiti were locked in Gentillon's mind until summer 2007. He conceived the film at the New York Film Academy (NYFA), where he studies acting, then assembled it at AAU, and released it seven years later. At NYFA, he also wrote lyrics for film music. Gentillon recruited and collaborated with music composer Trystan Matthews, musicians from Demo My Song studio (USA), and music production team from BonaFidaStudio (UK) to create an album entitled A PLACE TO COEXIST release under his artist name YUGY. The third track in this album is a song called Love Me Haiti. Later on, under the umbrella of self-founded company Yugy Pictures Entertainment, Gentillon obtained exclusive story-life rights from Dr. Alix Charles and others to produce Love Me Haiti. Gentillon then proposed the project to AAU academic film committee, headed by Diane Baker and composed of James Egan, Eduardo Rufeisen and other Hollywood film industry professionals. Love Me Haiti was accepted as Gentillon's MFA thesis film. Ex-Paramount producer/writer Andy Ruben was assigned as his main coach and famous American TV director Harry Winer as the collateral supervisor. As a result, Gentillon recruited a team of screenwriters and interviewed Dr. Alix Charles again. The story that he originally adapted was subsequently re-written a number of times, as if it was a film development in the real Hollywood collaborative world. Besides Gentillon, Alexander Stuart and Joyce Mccauley-Benner did most of the rewrites. Gentillon took all the supplemental ideas and diluted them into a final shooting script.

== Philosophical influences ==
Though Love Me Haiti seems to have a documentary feel; it fits better in the style of a realistic adaptation where the artist blends together observationalism with inductivism, conceptualism with thought-based and Human self-reflection, innovation with open-mindedness and receptiveness to new ideas. In cinéma vérité or true documentary, as per Jean Rouch's theory, the filmmakers cannot change the facts. Surprisingly, when the well-known deconstructionist-philosopher Jacques Derrida later became the subject of two documentary films, he postulated that everything about cinéma vérité is false: once reality passes through the lens of a camera it is no longer authentic. In other words, there is no such a thing as true documentary. Love Me Haiti is rather a faux cinéma vérité filmmatization or more precisely a dramatization of a true story. The realism in Love Me Haiti virtually subverts Derrida's claim with cognitive estrangement and suspension of disbelief.

== Release ==
A one-minute promo teaser trailer was published online, and a two-minute extended trailer was secretly screened on-site at film events, such as Festival de Cannes, Zanzibar International Film Festival, and Bahamas International Film Festival. The Love Me Haiti VIP trailer along with portion of the film were pirated in a festival screening room, and the patchy bootleg was sold on a Vimeo VOD channel by an underground television company. A number of websites quickly followed with unofficially selling the aesthetic poster of the Film. The new company Yugy Pictures Entertainment soon found itself battling a heavy load of pirates with DCMA copyright claims to stop and prevent further illegal transmission and diffusion of Love Me Haiti. A number of YouTube and Vimeo channels were hit. In June 2014, the French distribution company Gonella Productions non-exclusively acquired the thesis version of the film and sold it to cable/satellite TV and VOD company Shorts TV in Europe. A branch of this full-time short film channel company is known as ShortsHD, launched by DirecTV in the USA. An anonymous source reported that HD1/TF1 offered to be next in the pay-TV queue. However, neither Yugy Pictures Entertainment announced such screening on its websites, and nor Gonella Productions confirmed the existence of such a deal.
