= KWJC =

Radio station in Liberty, Missouri

Coordinates: 39.123°N 94.390°W

- Liberty, Missouri; United States
- Broadcast area: Kansas City metropolitan area
- Frequency: 91.9 MHz
- Branding: 91.9 Classical KC

Programming
- Language: English
- Format: Classical music
- Affiliations: Classical 24; National Public Radio; American Public Media

Ownership
- Owner: University of Missouri-Kansas City; (The Curators of the University of Missouri)
- Sister stations: KCUR-FM

History
- First air date: 1974; 52 years ago
- Former call signs: KWPB (1974–1985)
- Call sign meaning: Formerly owned by William Jewell College

Technical information
- Licensing authority: FCC
- Facility ID: 72478
- Class: C3
- ERP: 7,000 watts
- HAAT: 190 meters (623 ft)
- Repeater: 89.3 KCUR-HD2 (Kansas City)

Links
- Public license information: Public file; LMS
- Webcast: Listen live
- Website: www.classicalkc.org

KWJC (91.9 FM) is a listener-supported, non-commercial, public radio station airing a classical music radio format. It is licensed to Liberty, Missouri, and covers much of the Kansas City Metropolitan Area. KWJC is operated by the University of Missouri-Kansas City, along with sister station 89.3 KCUR-FM, which airs news and informational programming. KWJC mostly carries the national "Classical 24" network. It also runs some public radio network classical shows including Performance Today, Pipedreams and From The Top.

KWJC is a Class C3 station. It has an effective radiated power (ERP) of 7,000 watts. The station's transmitter tower is on East Swearingen Road in Independence, Missouri, off State Route 291.

== History ==
=== KWPB ===
The station signed on the air in 1974. It was a college radio station launched by the head of the William Jewell College communication department, Dr. Georgia B. Bowman. She convinced the school to name the station after a former Jewell president, Dr. Walter Pope Binns. The station broadcast from the third floor of the Yates College Union with a 10-watt FM transmitter. It could reach the college campus and some of the surrounding town of Liberty. There were three rooms: an outer multipurpose production space, an inner work room where the meager collection of albums and '45s were stored, and the control room where broadcasting students operated a two-channel mixing board, two closed cartridge tape transports, one reel-to-reel tape deck and two turntables. The transmitter was located in the control room, with the broadcast antenna mounted just outside the station on the roof of the union building.

Service interruptions were frequent. When a volunteer was unable to fulfill a shift assignment, the station would go off the air. During ice storms, which were common in the area, ice accumulation on the broadcast antenna would force the station to shut down to protect its transmitter. (KWPB staff learned this lesson the hard way after internal transmitter components were damaged during ice events, leading the station to wait weeks for replacement parts.) The station was also silent during school holidays, including the entire summer.

Dr. Bowman made sure that KWPB remained a primarily educational enterprise. The production space was used by students to produce "discussion" recordings, consisting of partly extemporaneous and partly edited recorded conversations among students about issues of the day, that were submitted for competitive evaluation against other college teams. Students wrote and produced public service announcements, ran station operations, and served as on-air talent. The first program director was a Jewell student named George Townsend who had some experience in radio broadcasting. The staff was all-volunteer, except that some students were paid under the U.S. government's work-study financial aid program.

=== Classical and Rock ===
The station broadcast classical music during the day when few students were likely to be listening, then progressive rock and other contemporary music during evenings and weekends. Despite the Baptist heritage of the college, religious content was limited to a regular subscription to "The Word from Unity" and a Southern Baptist youth-oriented program called "Powerline," both of which arrived by mail on reel-to-reel tape.

Evening and weekend contemporary pop music broadcasts were more popular with the staff, who viewed them as superior training experiences for future broadcasting careers. The station's record collection was inadequate even for a small audience, so student disc jockeys often used their personal collections for their shows, producing a de facto playlist that would best be described as eclectic and expansive. These evening shows were not very popular with Dr. Bowman, who occasionally called in to ban a song she had just heard over the air. One example was Bob Marley's "I Shot the Sheriff."

Eventually, William Jewell college football broadcasts were launched for most home and away games. A modest equipment package allowed a two-person broadcast crew to send live play-by-play and color back to the station by telephone link, which were typically dial-up. Leased lines were used as the meager station budget allowed.

During the early years, KWPB did not sell sponsorships that are otherwise common in public broadcasting. The college development staff worried that such appeals might dilute Jewell's larger fundraising efforts, and so the station was forced to survive on a small allocation from the school's operating budget. Necessity being the mother of invention, the student staff and director Dr. Bowman improvised.

=== Upgrading the equipment ===
During the second year of operation, students purchased building materials from a local Liberty merchant (with funds probably provided from Dr. Bowman's personal account). They installed a soundproof, windowed partition between the broadcast booth and the transmitter, finally eliminating transmitter fan noises that had been so noticeable when a microphone was open in the booth. The work was done while the station was on-air, so construction volunteers were forced to suspend work whenever microphones were open.

One cartridge closed-loop tape player used to play public service announcements developed a habit of burning out an internal solid state part. With no repair budget to deploy, student staff enlisted the help of the physics department to diagnose the problem and isolate and replace the failed component.

When an electronics lab student assembled an Emergency Broadcast System receiver using Popular Mechanics plans and donated parts as a class assignment, station staff appropriated and installed the device in the broadcast booth, and from then on faithfully rebroadcast alerts from the other stations in Kansas City.

=== KWJC ===
The 1980s saw two modest upgrades: an ERP increase to 182 watts in 1982, and beginning January 1, 1985, new KWJC call letters, reflecting the name of the college. The station was known as "Stereo 91-9" in this era.

In its later years, the station was "The Edge", playing alternative music with a broad, eclectic playlist. However, the format came to an abrupt end when a tornado struck Liberty and the William Jewell campus; damage to the college was extensive, with most of the residence halls destroyed.

After the tornado, The Edge became "Jewell 91.9" with an adult contemporary format, after a new professor was brought on board and sought to revamp the radio program along the lines of a commercial radio station. The move also came with a $100,000 facility upgrade including all-new sound equipment; professional radio software, sound and recording equipment; and top-quality acoustic foam. Even though many students were disappointed about the change in format, most appreciated the ability to learn more of how a station operated.

=== EMF operation ===
Citing the costs of running the radio station (and probably the decline of radio jobs available to graduates due to the rise of audio streaming and other technologies), William Jewell College opted to terminate the Radio Communication program after the 2005–06 school year and lease KWJC to the Educational Media Foundation to air its K-LOVE Christian radio network. On May 31, 2006, at noon, a few sad members of the Jewell 91.9 Student & Faculty Staff said an on-air goodbye and the station was handed over.

After Union Broadcasting sold KCXM to EMF, KWJC switched from K-LOVE to the Air1 network on December 16, 2007. That same year, the FCC approved a 1998 application to increase power to 4,000 watts; in 2016, it was approved to upgrade to 7,000 watts.

On May 31, 2019, William Jewell College took KWJC silent, citing a loss of programming. The move came after EMF bought K300CH, a translator facility of KCFX-HD3 in Kansas City, from the Calvary Chapel of Kansas City for $515,000, and Air1 moved to the 107.9 frequency, with KWJC airing a loop redirecting listeners to 107.9 and 101.1 HD3.

=== Sale to UMKC, flip to classical ===
On August 16, 2019, KCUR-FM, the National Public Radio affiliate operated by the University of Missouri-Kansas City (UMKC), announced it had agreed to purchase KWJC from William Jewell College for $2 million. KCUR-FM would flip 91.9 into a full-time classical music station, returning the format to the FM band in Kansas City for the first time in 19 years. In August 2000, commercial classical station 96.5 KXTR (now KFNZ-FM) announced it would move to the AM band leaving classical listeners without an FM station. With a full time classical outlet in on the Kansas City FM dial, KCUR-FM 89.3 eliminated its own three-hour weeknight block of classical programming and switched to an all news and information format.

The purchase was consummated on June 26, 2020. On June 30, KWJC returned to the air with all classical music, fed by American Public Media's "Classical 24" service. For a time, KWJC had local classical music hosts during morning and afternoon drive times. But in October 2024, due to declining donations, the station dropped local shows and began running Classical 24 most of the day.
