= Flashpoints (radio program) =

Radio program

Flashpoints is a daily, politically progressive investigative news and public affairs program broadcast weekdays at 5 p.m. PST on Pacifica Radio station KPFA-FM (94.1) in Berkeley, California. The program is broadcast on Pacifica's national feed.

Executive producer Dennis Bernstein and his team focus on issues and events the mainstream and even some alternative news media usually ignore, such as developments in Palestine, Haiti, and Mexico, the struggles of immigrants, Native Americans, and other minority communities within the U.S., and problems of police brutality and prisoner rights. The program's coverage of Israel and Palestine, including reports by former senior producer Nora Barrows-Friedman, has been criticized by Zionists.

The Flashpoints team also includes roving producer Miguel Molina, senior producer Kevin Pina and technical director Mike Biggs.
