= 12th Street Jump =

- Country of origin: United States
- Language(s): English
- Home station: KCUR-FM
- Syndicates: Public Radio Exchange
- Starring: Eboni Fondren, David Basse, Jackie Myers
- Recording studio: Kansas City, United States
- Original release: 2009 – 2020
- Website: www.12thstreetjump.com

12th Street Jump was a weekly public radio series, which was broadcast in the United States as well as over internet radio stations around the world. The show was based in Kansas City, where it began broadcasting from in 2009. The show focused on two genres, Jazz and Blues, while including regular comedy segments. David Basse and Eboni Fondren (Pearl Rovaris MacDonald prior to 2014) were the show's hosts. They regularly had guests on the show and interviewed leading Jazz and Blues artists.

In 2015, the show had spread its reach to over 115 stations across the United States.

== History ==
12th Street Jump began broadcasting in 2009. It was produced by Theater League in Kansas City. The public radio show was a weekly show, focusing on Jazz, Blues and also comedy segments. The show was recorded at the Green Lady Lounge, 1809 Grand Avenue, on Wednesday nights from 7:30 to 9:00pm in Kansas City.

It was first broadcast on KCUR FM89.3, Kansas City's public radio station. Its first broadcast came from the Mutual Musicians Foundation, a historic building in the Historic 18th and Vine Jazz district, where Dizzy Gillespie is rumored to have met Charlie Parker.

In 2010, the show moved to 12th Street Rag, a club located in downtown Kansas City. A renovation of the hotel where the club is located forced the show to move to its next location. It was recorded live at the Broadway Jazz Club for subsequent broadcast on stations across the United States.

In 2017, the show was aired on 60 public radio stations in the United States on a weekly basis.

== Background ==
The weekly show is one hour long, combining Jazz and Blues with topical sketch comedy, similar to shows such as Saturday Night Live and Prairie Home Companion. The show is hosted by Pete Weber and Eboni Fondren (Pearl Rovaris MacDonald prior to 2014), who regularly interview Jazz and Blues musicians on their show. 12th Street Jump celebrates the birthday of a major jazz or blues musical influence on each show.

The show commonly features the music of various Jazz and Blues artists including John Coltrane, Thelonious Monk, Duke Ellington and Louis Armstrong as well as composers like George Gershwin and Johnny Mercer.

=== Guests ===
The show regularly features guests from a variety of backgrounds, including vocalists, drummers, trumpet players, saxophonists and guitarists. The variety of guests gives the show diversity. Guests have included Karrin Allyson, Kevin Mahogany, Jeff Hamilton, Joe Sample, Randy Brecker, Wycliffe Gordon, Sean Jones, Christian McBride, and Rod Fleeman.

=== Comedy ===
Each week comedy sketches are presented on each weekly broadcast, incorporating Jazz and Blues themes. Their weekly "Blues in the News" feature spoofs celebrities and politicians and has received national coverage. Other sketches include "Dr Pearl", "Eboni," " Ask the Professor," Serena's School for Scat," "The Jazz Mechanics," "So What's Your Question", "Sonny Zoot Reedman – Sax Therapist" and "Who's Got the Blues". Each Sketch has a unique approach, more often than not relating back to Blues or Jazz.

== Personnel ==
CURRENT

- Eboni Fondren (Host)
- Jackie Myers (Pianist and Musical Director)
- David Basse (Vocalist)
- Tyrone Clark (Bass)
- Jim Lower (Drums)
- Derek Djovig (Audio Engineer)
- Paul Seaburn (Writer)
- Mark Edelman (Creator, Executive Producer)

PAST MEMBERS INCLUDE

- Pete Weber (Host 2009-2018)
- Pearl Rovaris Ma

cDonald (Host 2009-2014)

- Joe Cartwright (Pianist and Musical Director 2009-2018)
- Mike Warren (Drums 2009-2016)
- Todd Strait (Drums 2016-?)
- Nedra Dixon (Vocalist 2009-2014)
- Ian York (Director)
- Chad Meise (Audio Engineer 2009-2014)
