= KPFA =

Public, listener-funded radio station in Berkeley, California

KPFA and KPFB
Berkeley, California; United States
- Broadcast area: San Francisco Bay Area
- Frequencies: KPFA: 94.1 MHz; KPFB: 89.3 MHz
- Branding: Pacifica Radio

Programming
- Language(s): English
- Format: Free-form; Progressive
- Affiliations: Pacifica Radio Network

Ownership
- Owner: Pacifica Foundation

History
- First air date: KPFA: April 15, 1949
- Call sign meaning: Pacifica

Technical information
- Licensing authority: FCC
- Facility ID: KPFA: 51246; KPFB: 51243
- Class: KPFA: B; KPFB: A
- ERP: KPFA: 59,000 watts (horizontal only); KPFB: 460 watts (horizontal only)
- HAAT: KPFA: 405 meters (1,329 ft); KPFB: −30 meters (−98 ft)
- Transmitter coordinates: KPFA: 37°51′54.7″N 122°13′15.8″W; KPFB: 37°52′19.7″N 122°16′21.8″W
- Translator(s): 94.3 K232CZ (Monterey); 97.5 K248BR (Santa Cruz)
- Repeater(s): 94.1 KPFA-FM3 (Oakley)

Links
- Public license information: KPFA: Public file; LMS; KPFB: Public file; LMS
- Webcast: Listen live
- Website: kpfa.org

KPFA (94.1 FM) is a public, listener-funded talk radio and music radio station located in Berkeley, California, broadcasting to the San Francisco Bay Area. KPFA airs public news, public affairs, talk, and music programming. The station signed on the air April 15, 1949, as the first Pacifica Radio station and remains the flagship station of the Pacifica Radio Network.

The station's studios are located in Downtown Berkeley, and its transmitter site is located in the Berkeley Hills.

== History ==
Launched in 1949, three years after the Pacifica Foundation was created by pacifist Lewis Hill, KPFA became the first station in the Pacifica Radio network and the first listener-supported radio broadcaster in the United States. Previously, non-commercial stations were licensed only to serve educational functions as extensions of high schools, colleges, and universities. This departure into listener-oriented programming brought many detractors as KPFA aired controversial programming. The first interview with anyone from the gay political movement was broadcast by KPFA, as well as Allen Ginsberg's poem Howl in the 1950s. In 1954 the broadcast by a group of marijuana reform advocates extolling the pleasures of cannabis resulted in the tape being impounded by the California Attorney General. In the 1960s KPFA and Pacifica were accused of being controlled by the Communist Party, and several challenges to its license were waged, none of them successful.

In the early 60's Phil Lesh, future founding member and bass player for the Grateful Dead, worked there as a volunteer recording engineer.

KPFA was the first station to broadcast a radio show specializing in space music, with the debut of Stephen Hill and Anna Turner's Music from the Hearts of Space in 1973. Ten years later, the show – now known by the shorter title Hearts of Space – was syndicated in the U.S. to NPR stations, while remaining at its first home at KPFA.

In the 1970s and 1980s, it broadcast a weekly long-running radio program called Fruit Punch for gay and lesbian listeners.

Since 1981, the station is known for airing the pioneering culture jamming sound collage show Over the Edge. Originally hosted by Don Joyce of Negativland, it is the longest-running block of free-form audio collage in radio history.

KPFA is also known for Puzzling Evidence, the longest running radio program of the Church of the Subgenius hosted by Doug Wellman and Harry S. Robins. The program was the inspiration for the Talking Heads song of the same name from the band's film True Stories.

== Labor disputes ==
In 1999 the station was effectively taken over by KPFA's governing Pacifica Foundation, after Dennis Bernstein, the long-established host of the station's Flashpoints news magazine, was forcibly removed by police for airing grievances on air over a labor dispute. A broad cross section of protesters joined in direct action outside of the station in a weeks-long lockout during which station management spent over half a million dollars on security measures. At one point, listeners created a separate fund to accept listener pledges that would be directed away from the Pacifica Foundation.

In 2007, KPFA derecognized its Unpaid Staff Organization. The staff claimed that Pacifica Radio had been making network more corporate, softening its voice of dissent, and attempting to get rid of some of the volunteers at the station. In 2008, a forcible removal by police of a KPFA volunteer highlighted the concerns between management and volunteer staff.

A member of the KPFA board suggested that it was problematic that there was no grievance procedure for unpaid staff at the station.

In November 2010, the management of Pacifica laid off most of the staff of the popular KPFA Morning Show. The union representing the paid staff of KPFA claims that the layoffs were done in violation of the union contract. Pacifica management says the layoffs were financially necessary and done according to staff seniority. Pacifica management replaced the paid staff of the Morning Show with an all-volunteer crew.

== Affiliated stations ==
KPFA's sister stations are WBAI New York, KPFT Houston, KPFK Los Angeles, and WPFW Washington DC. Pacifica continues today to be a listener-supported network of stations. The main KPFA transmitter is a 59 kilowatt class B, though there is a booster KPFA-FM3 in Oakley. KPFB 89.3 is a smaller station, also in Berkeley, that covers areas of Berkeley that are shielded from the main KPFA signal by the Berkeley Hills. It also carries some separate programming specifically for its Berkeley audience. KPFA programs are also rebroadcast by KFCF in Fresno. KZFR in Chico also carries KPFA's programming from 2:00-6:00 a.m. daily. KZSC Santa Cruz simultaneously broadcasts KPFA's Pacifica Evening News on weeknights. In the Bay Area, Comcast carries KPFA's broadcasts on cable channel 967, as part of its digital radio offering. The channel is labeled "Variety/Berkeley".

== See also ==
- Aimee Allison
- Charles Amirkhanian
- Larry Bensky
- Pratap Chatterjee
- Laurie Garrett
- Adi Gevins
- Matt Gonzalez
- Doug Henwood
- Don Joyce
- Pauline Kael
- Ramsey Kanaan
- William Mandel
- Richard Pryor
- Kenneth Rexroth
- Nicole Sawaya
- Bonnie Simmons
- Elsa Knight Thompson
- Alan Watts
- Negativland
- Over the Edge
