= Nicole Sawaya =

Lebanese-American radio journalist (1952–2018)

Nicole Sawaya (14 June 1952 – 11 October 2018) was a Lebanese-American radio journalist who was the Executive Director of the Pacifica Radio Network.

Sawaya started her career as a news reporter before moving into radio management.

Moving from San Francisco to Anderson Valley in Mendocino County, Nicole was also for a period in the 1990s Program Director at community radio station KZYX-KZYZ, Philo, CA.

In July 1999 she was controversially fired as general manager of KPFA-FM, the first public radio station in the US and the flagship station of the Pacifica Network. This led to what has been called the Pacifica Crisis, which involved the largest demonstrations seen in Berkeley, California, since the end of the Vietnam War, more than 10,000 people marching to demand community control of KPFA. She was hired by Pacifica as Executive Director of the network on September 30, 2007, commencing work in November. She resigned in early December 2007 due to the "level of internecine dysfunction.". She resumed the Executive Director position on March 5, 2008, taking over from interim ED Dan Siegel. Nicole died on October 11, 2018, from complications due to cancer.
