= Families of the Fallen for Change =

Families of the Fallen for Change is a US anti-Iraq War group which now has over 1,000 members. It was founded by Paul Schroeder and Rosemary Palmer.

The group formed in response to the deaths of fourteen United States Marines from Columbus, Ohio's Lima Company in August 2005 due to a roadside bomb.
