= Haiti: Harvest of Hope =

- Directed by: Kevin Pina
- Written by: Stephen Most and Kevin Pina
- Produced by: Kevin Pina
- Music by: Various artists
- Release date: March 28, 1994 (Port-au-Prince)
- Running time: 57 minutes
- Countries: United States; Haiti
- Languages: English; Haitian Creole

Haiti: Harvest of Hope is a documentary produced by Kevin Pina and released in 1994. It covers the election of Jean-Bertrand Aristide in 1990 in Haiti, and the four following years of military coup and brutality.

== Presentation ==
Haiti: Harvest of Hope was originally planned as a documentary about democracy coming to Haiti with the election of Jean-Bertrand Aristide in December 1990. During the final editing of the original (late September 1991), Haiti was struck by yet another military coup. Editing of the first version came to a halt when the journalist Kevin Pina returned to Haiti, spending three weeks chronicling the brutality and machinations of Haiti's new military leaders and their supporters. Kevin Pina returned to Haiti in late July 1993 just after the negotiation of the Governor's Island Accord between the Haitian Government in exile and General Raoul Cédras. Pina returned again in 1994 to film Aristide's return to Haiti.

Kevin Pina produced sequels of this documentary, Haiti: The UNtold Story (2005) and Haiti: We Must Kill the Bandits (2007).

== Distribution ==
The world television premiere of Harvest of Hope was in Haiti on May 28, 1995. The Haitian Creole version was produced in association with Jean-Claude Martineau who also introduced the film on Télévision Nationale d'Haïti. The English version is narrated by Roscoe Lee Browne and premiered at the Mill Valley Film Festival in the summer of 1994.
