= Aaron Glantz =

American journalist

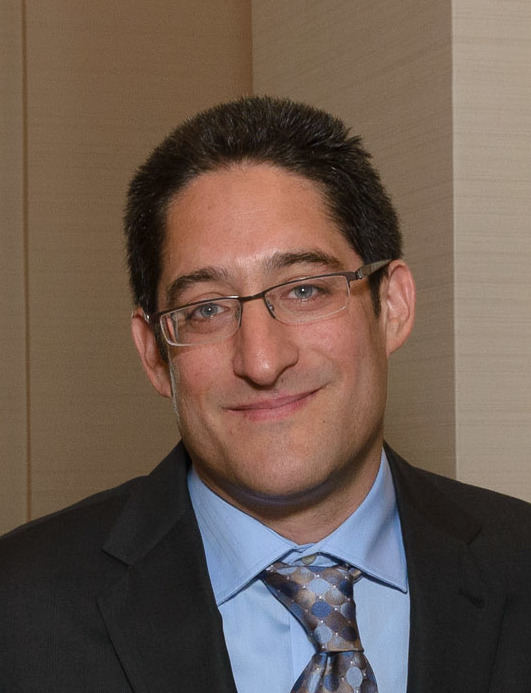
Aaron Glantz at the 73rd Annual Peabody Awards

Aaron Glantz (born August 10, 1977) is an American journalist.

A former war correspondent who has reported from a dozen countries, including Iraq, Glantz has been a fellow at the DART Center for Journalism and Trauma at Columbia University, a Rosalynn Carter Fellow for Mental Health Journalism at the Carter Center, a JSK Journalism Fellow at Stanford University, and a visiting professor at the University of California Berkeley's Graduate School of Journalism.

== Career ==
In November 2002, when the Anglo-American invasion of Iraq appeared imminent, Glantz traveled to Istanbul to cover regional reaction to the crisis. When Saddam Hussein was overthrown on April 9, 2003, Glantz traveled to Baghdad as an unembedded journalist to cover Iraqi experience of U.S. occupation.

Since returning from his last visit to Iraq, Glantz has devoted considerable attention to the damaging effects of the war on American veterans focusing on the difficulties that veterans have experienced in their efforts to obtain services from the United States Department of Veterans Affairs.

During the course of his career, Glantz has also reported internationally in a dozen countries across Europe, Asia, and the Middle East.

== Awards and fellowships ==
Glantz's reporting has been honored with numerous awards, including a George Foster Peabody Award, two Military Reporters and Editors awards, and an award for from the Online News Association. He also received a national investigative reporting award from the Society of Professional Journalists for his coverage of veterans' suicides. and was nominated for a national News and Documentary Emmy Award for his reporting on narcotics.

He has been a Rosalynn Carter Fellow for Mental Health Journalism at the Carter Center, a DART Center Fellow for Journalism and Trauma at Columbia University Journalism School, and a fellow at the Hechinger Institute on Education and the Media and Columbia University Teachers College.

In 2011, the San Francisco Board of Supervisors issued a proclamation to honor to Glantz for his "extraordinary efforts as a critically acclaimed author... who through word and deed is saving lives."

Glantz is a two-time Peabody Award-winning journalist and Pulitzer Prize finalist.

== Books on the Iraq War ==
In 2005 Aaron Glantz published his book How America Lost Iraq (Tarcher/Penguin), in which he gives a voice to the Iraqis and tells how the U.S. government squandered, through a series of blunders and brutalities, the goodwill with which most Iraqis greeted the American invasion and the elation they felt at the fall of Saddam Hussein.

In 2008 the book Winter Soldier: Iraq & Afghanistan (Haymarket) was published edited by Glantz in collaboration with Iraq Veterans Against the War. The book dovetails with the Winter Soldier: Iraq & Afghanistan event detailing allegations of military misconduct among U.S. soldiers in Iraq.

In 2009, Glantz published "The War Comes Home: Washington's Battle Against America's Veterans" (UC Press), the first book to systematically document the government's failure to care for returning soldiers coming home from Iraq and Afghanistan.

== Personal life ==
Glantz lives in San Francisco with his wife, journalist Ngoc Nguyen and their two children. His father is Stanton Glantz, Ph.D., a leading researcher and activist on the health effects of tobacco. He is a third-generation San Franciscan.

== Bibliography ==
- Glantz, Aaron (2019), Homewreckers: How a Gang of Wall Street Kingpins, Hedge Fund Magnates, Crooked Banks, and Vulture Capitalists Suckered Millions Out of Their Homes and Demolished the American Dream, Custom House, LCCN 2019030888, OL 20818455W, Wikidata Q119791024
- Glantz, Aaron (2009). The War Comes Home: Washington's Battle against America's Veterans. University of California Press. ISBN 978-0-520-25612-5. LCCN 2008035579. Wikidata Q119791767.
- Glantz, Aaron (2008), Winter Soldier: Iraq and Afghanistan: Eyewitness Accounts of the Occupations, OL 12049528W, Wikidata Q119791718
- Glantz, Aaron (2005). How America Lost Iraq. Penguin Group. ISBN 1-58542-426-9. LCCN 2005043941. Wikidata Q119791807.
