= About Face: Veterans Against the War =

Advocacy group

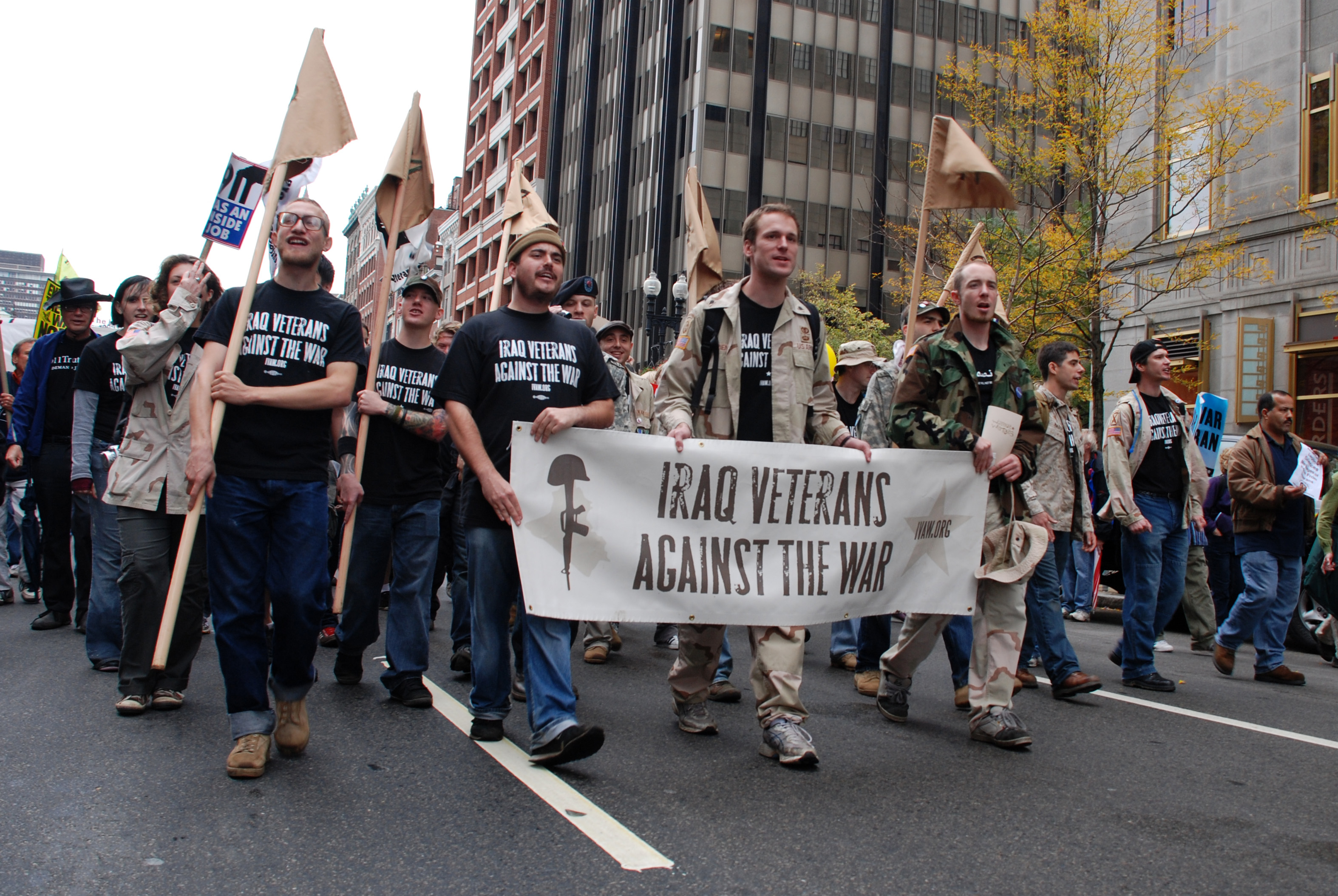
Iraq Against the War marching in Boston, October 2007

About Face (formerly Iraq Veterans Against the War) is an advocacy group founded in 2004 of formerly active-duty United States military personnel, Iraq War veterans, Afghanistan War veterans, and other veterans who have served since the September 11, 2001 attacks; who were opposed to the U.S. military invasion and occupation in Iraq from 2003 to 2011. The organization advocated the immediate withdrawal of all coalition forces in Iraq, and reparations paid to the Iraqi people. It also provides support services for returning veterans including health care and mental health.

Al Hubbard, co-founder of Vietnam Veterans Against the War, has stated his support of the organization.

== Membership ==
The membership is composed of American military veterans, active-duty service personnel from all branches of the military, and U.S. National Guard members and reservists who have served since September 11, 2001. Prospective members are required to provide proof of military service.

The group was founded in July 2004, with controversy due to its exclusion of Desert Storm veterans, who had served in Iraq, and were opposed to war. Desert Storm veteran Dennis Kyne spoke at the opening session during the Veterans for Peace (VFP) convention against this separation. After the organization changed name from 'Iraq Veterans Against the War' to more broadly 'Veterans Against the War', they have opened membership to anybody who served in the military since September 11, 2001.

== Stop-loss policy ==
About Face has protested the military's stop-loss policy, which is an extension of soldiers' Active Duty service period by the Department of Defense. All service members sign up for a minimum of eight years of total service, a portion of which may be served in the Individual Ready Reserve. The Defense Department may recall members from inactive service as noted in their enlistment contracts. Several tower-guard vigils against the stop-loss have been held in various places including Colorado Springs, Colorado; Bellingham, Washington; and Washington D.C.

== Winter Soldier: Iraq & Afghanistan ==
Winter Soldier: Iraq & Afghanistan was an event in Washington, D.C. in March 2008, run by About Face, at which U.S. veterans spoke about their experiences during the Iraq War and the War in Afghanistan (2001–present). It was inspired by the similar 1971 event put on by Vietnam Veterans Against the War (VVAW).

== Action following Fort Hood shooting ==
Following the Fort Hood shooting of November 5, 2009, Michael Kern, former President of the Fort Hood About Face chapter attempted to hand President Obama a statement from the organization, when the President visited his barracks at Fort Hood on November 10. The statement in part demanded that the military radically overhaul its mental health care system, and halt the practice of repeated deployment of the same troops.

== Refuge in Canada ==
The Canadian parliament is considering an amendment to the Immigration and Refugee Protection Act, which would provide legal sanctuary for U.S. war resisters.

== See also ==
- Winter Soldier: Iraq & Afghanistan
- Gold Star Families for Peace
- Vietnam Veterans Against the War
- The Ground Truth
- Coffee Strong, a GI coffeehouse
- Under the Hood Café, a GI coffeehouse
- Diplomats and Military Commanders for Change
- Families of the Fallen for Change
- List of anti-war organizations
- List of peace activists
- Stephen Funk
- Robin Long
- Camilo Mejia
- Adam Kokesh
