= Kunio Sawaya =

Japanese engineer and researcher

Kunio Sawaya (born c.1950) is a Japanese engineer and researcher, currently a professor at the Laboratory of Electromagnetic Wave Engineering in Tohoku University, Sendai.

Sawaya obtained his first degree, his master's degree and his doctorate from Tohoku University during the 1970s. He was named Fellow of the Institute of Electrical and Electronics Engineers (IEEE) in 2012 for contributions to computational electromagnetics and characterization of antennas in plasmas.
