= Radio4all.net =

Internet radio

A-Infos Radio Project
- Website type: archive
- Available in: English
- Owner: Northern California Public Broadcasting
- Website: radio4all.net
- Commercial: No
- Registration: Optional
- Launched: October 1996; 30 years ago
- Current status: Active
- Content license: Non-commercial

The A-Infos Radio Project was formed in October 1996 by Lyn Gerry and other grassroots broadcasters, free radio journalists and cyber-activists to provide the means to share radio programs via the Internet. Programs are typically submitted from "independent or alternative media", which refers to a form of media that is free of influence by government or corporate interests (i.e. "mainstream media."). Anyone may upload programs and the content is posted to the web page immediately.

== Origins ==
The A-Infos audio internet archive began in response to a reorganisation of the Pacifica radio station that eliminated many of its more controversial programmers. An interview with Lyn Gerry reports that the original intention of the project was "to create a “wire service” of sorts where radio producers can source other producer's material in a wide process of collaboration." It may have been the first website to allow free upload and download of audio files, a deliberately created free alternative to the concentration of corporate media outlets and perspectives. The site never made any distinction between downloads to radio stations and downloads for personal listening, which from 2004 came to be known as podcasts.

== Operations ==
Radio4all accepts donations from its users and has never carried advertising or received corporate sponsorship. Radio4All.net is operated exclusively by volunteers on an occasional basis, many of whom have never met in person, but who communicate through a mailing list. Lyn Gerry has stated that the decision not to censor any material was mainly pragmatic. Northern California Public Broadcasting was a nonprofit formed in 1990 to start a radio station in northern California but this didn't happen, instead it became an engineering support project that in 2019 adopted Radio4all, with the same engineers who had maintained the site from the late 1990s. Operating expenses are met by voluntary user contributions.

== Contents ==
The A-Infos Radio Project was the first grassroots media project of its kind on the internet to allow free upload and download of programs, and has attracted a wide variety of audio material. The focus remains on public domain radio programmes from various perspectives and often of an alternative political nature. Programs address both local and global issues and perspectives vary substantially, but the most often included are environmentalism, socialism, humanitarianism and anarchism.

Beginning in the late 1990s using dial up modem connections, program producers and micro-radio stations began exchanging radio programming segments using radio4all.net as an open audio library. Lyn (Lyn Gerry) attended the N.A.B. 2000 counter convention in San Francisco CA Radio Show #31 and presented this concept to Low Power FM station applicants who were awaiting FCC licensing of Local Non-Corporate radio station service. In a few years more than 500 LPFM stations were licensed and began broadcasting and creating content and sharing it with Similar stations across North America and worldwide. Radio4all.net ran as a free service worked well for the no-budget LPFM stations springing up across the country (WSCA, WRIR, WCOM, KNFS, KQRP, KRFP, KRFP-LP).

In December 2016 the archive reached 90,000 uploads from over 5,000 producers, of which around 68,000 were still available for download. As a 100% non-commercial operation, it relies on donations. The site has occasional outages and has occasionally limited download speed. On May 14, 2012, the site suffered an outage due to late payment of domain renewal charges, but was soon restored. The site functions autonomously without human intervention or moderation; anyone can upload or download programs.

Several long running syndicated radio shows such as Deconstructing Dinner, TUC Radio, If You Love This Planet and Lyn Gerry's own Unwelcome Guests have used the site for hosting their archives.

== See also ==
- Internet activism
- Independent media
- Concentration of media ownership
- Freedom of speech
- Freedom of the press
- Mainstream media
- Media bias
- Media democracy
- Media imperialism
