= Observationalism =

Observationalism is the philosophical study of reality or knowledge by observation. From observation, one can derive utter facts. It is often called "The Art to Understanding Everything". At the center of this belief is Epistemology.
