= Alex Wise (radio personality) =

Alex Wise (born c. 1968) is the host and executive producer of Sea Change Radio, a nationally distributed interview-format radio show concerned with the advances being made toward a more environmentally sustainable world, economy, and future.

== Background ==
Originally from New England, Wise graduated from the prep school Phillips Academy at Andover in 1986. After that he earned a bachelor's degree at Emory University and a Masters at the Fletcher School at Harvard and Tufts. In his early career he worked as a bond broker, then for Time Warner and News Corp in Los Angeles and Japan. He eventually settled in San Francisco where he spent the 1990s employed by various companies floating upon the dot com bubble. Once the bubble burst, Wise shed his corporate chains and got in touch with his progressive values. By 2008 Wise had co-founded ObamaTravel.com, a project which Craigslist founder Craig Newmark called “a good example of genuine grassroots democracy.” With no actual training in journalism, in 2010 Wise began as the host and executive producer of Sea Change Radio. On this weekly show, focused on environmental sustainability, Wise has interviewed environmentalist superstars such as Van Jones, Paul Ehrlich, and Stewart Brand, as well as some of his personal heroes like Bill Kreutzmann and John Perry Barlow.

== Sea Change Radio ==
Under Wise, Sea Change Radio's distribution model changed. Previously, Sea Change Radio was exclusively heard through low-power radio stations, community radio, internet radio, and public radio. In 2010, Wise took the show out from the fiscal sponsorship of the Trusteeship Institute, a 501(c)3, and out of nonprofit mode. Wise put the show on the Bay Area's commercial progressive talk radio station Green 960 and began to solicit sponsors, allowing the show to generate revenue for the first time and building its potential for long-term survival. Since taking over Sea Change Radio, Wise has stirred up some minor controversy in environmental circles. First, Wise interviewed a guest who had a favorable opinion of smart grid electricity networks, which inspired a number of fans opposed to the technology to disavow the show. Then he featured pro-nuclear power advocates Jesse Jenkins from the Breakthrough Institute and Stewart Brand, and alienated an additional set of listeners. Wise has also featured guests opposed to nuclear power.

== Musical career ==
Wise has played guitar and been the front man for bands such as The Shreep and A. Wise Groove. The Shreep released its first album Shreepwalkin' in 2003. Later in 2003, Wise wrote and produced his first solo album of all original material called Front Porch, which received praise from critics who called it, “a hybrid conflation of J.J. Cale's and the Grateful Dead's spaciousness” and, “blues-based acoustic folk with swampy overtones”. In 2012, Wise completed his second solo album, Blurred. The album also received favorable reviews. In 2016, Wise released a musical project with his band Fog Swamp — the debut album, entitled Slinkin', was described as "a swampy sound that's sly, shifting and consistently seductive" in No Depression Magazine. Fog Swamp's next two releases were the eponymously titled Fog Swamp (2018) and Dropped Days (2020).
