= Rex Theater (Haiti) =

Rex Théâtre
- Interactive map of the Rex Théâtre area

General information
- Location: Port-au-Prince, Haiti
- Coordinates: 18.539°N 72.335°W
- Completed: 1935

The Rex Theater (French: Rex Théâtre) is a venue in Port-au-Prince, Haiti that opened in October, 1935. It was built by the Société Haïtienne des Spectacles (Haitian Entertainment Corporation), led by Daniel Brun. The theater seated 1,200 people and was managed by Mrs. Muffat Taldy until 1951.

== Cultural events ==
The Rex has been the site of many cultural and entertainment events. In its first week, the Rex Theater screened films that included La Bataille (The Battle), La Robe Rouge (The Red Dress), Gai Divorce (The Gay Divorcee), and Banque Nemo (Nemo's Bank), and hosted its first play in April 1937. Marian Anderson performed at the Rex in January 1954 in honour of the 150th anniversary of Haitian independence^{:60}. Folk acapella ensemble Sweet Honey in the Rock also performed at Rex Théâtre in Fall 1994 to mark the return of constitutional democracy to Haiti.

From 1961 to 1971, the theatre was managed by Monsieur Edouard Rigaud and his wife, Nelly Mercier Rigaud, under an agreement with its owner at the time, Philippe Charlier. During their ten-year tenure, the theatre hosted numerous ballet performances, annual productions by the Jean Gosselin troupe, and several major film events. Weekends were devoted to special musical entertainment featuring local ensembles such as Nemours Jean-Baptiste, Jazz des Jeunes, Weber Sicot, and many others.

== Political events ==
On various occasions events at the Rex have had a political focus or political implications. For example, on 20 December 1945, as the first of a planned series of twelve lectures, the poet André Breton spoke at the Rex on "Surréalisme". Upon completing his lecture, which was attended by six hundred students as well as the president of Haiti and many of his ministers, senators and deputies, and some military dignitaries and business people,

legend has it that Breton did not shake President Lescot's hand upon leaving the Rex Theater... If true, President Lescot would have taken the gesture as a public affront, and those in attendance would have read it as an act of solidarity to their cause.... the publication of the speech in La Ruche led to the Haitian government's seizure of the magazine and the imprisonment of certain of its editors, including Depestre, in turn provoking a student demonstration that led to the fall of President Lescot.

Many years later, in 2001, the Rex was the planned site of an opposition political event. The Rex Theater had been the initially planned site for the "inauguration" of Gérard Gourgue as an "alternative president". However, "the theater's management, fearful of popular outrage, canceled the event".
