= Arnold Antonin =

Haitian film director

Arnold Antonin
Haitian Screenwriter and Director
Born: December 3, 1942 in Port-au-Prince, Haiti
Alma mater: La Sapienza Facoltà, Università di Roma and Central University of Venezuela
Notable works: Jacques Roumain : la Passion d'un Pays, Le Président a-t-il le sida ?, Les amours d'un zombi, etc.

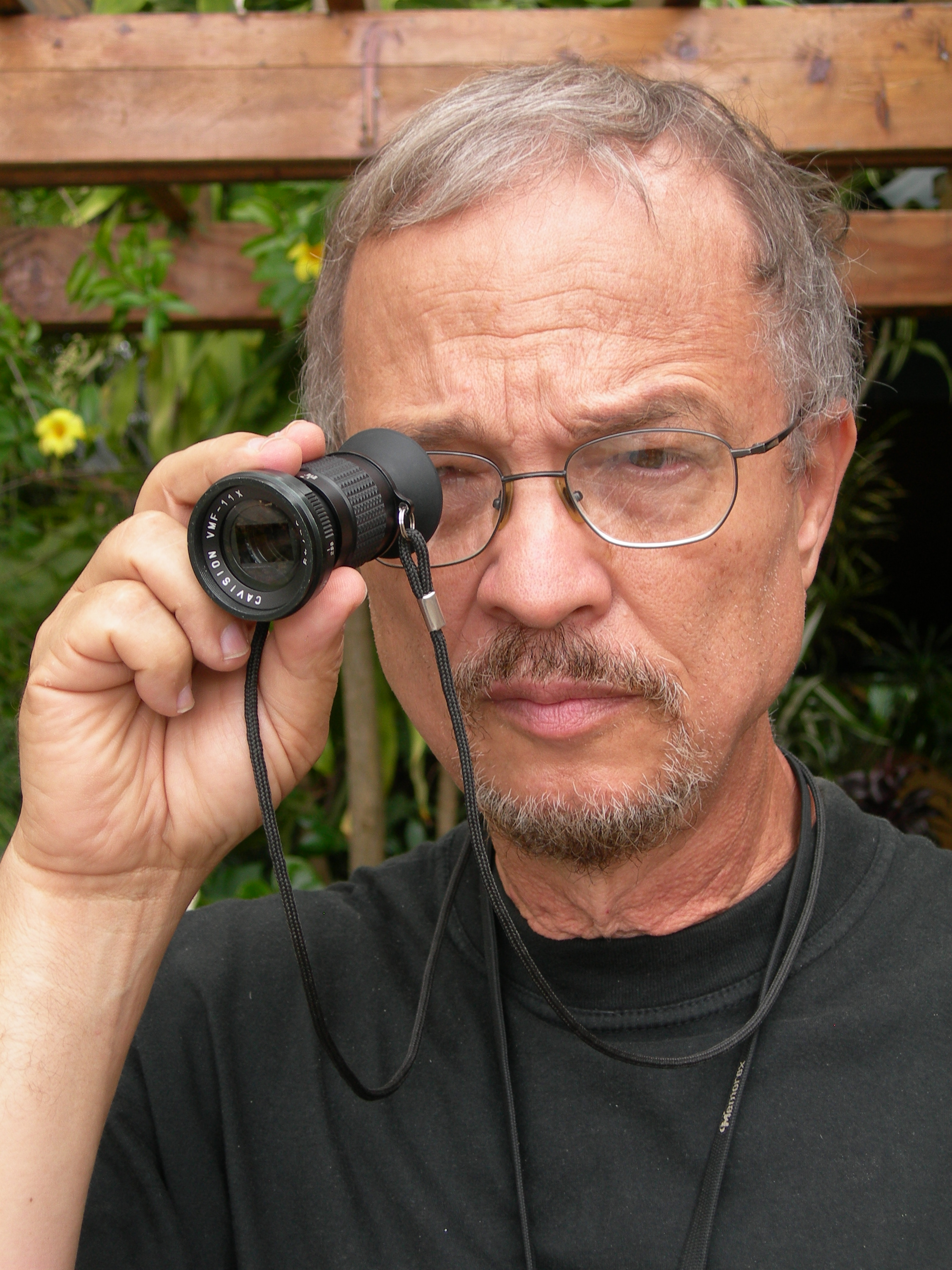
Filmmaker Arnold Antonin was honored as part of the Book Fortnight 2019 which ran from June 2 to 20, 2019.

Arnold Antonin (born 1942 in Port-au-Prince, Haiti) is a Haitian film director. A man of diverse careers, Arnold Antonin is known both inside and outside Haiti for his social, political and cultural commitment. He was honored for lifetime achievement with the Djibril Diop Mambety award at the International Film Cannes Festival in 2002. He received the Paul Robeson African Diaspora best film award at FESPACO in Ouagadougou in 2007, 2009, and 2011. He also received numerous awards and accolades at festivals for his documentaries and fiction movies. He was president of the Haitian Filmmakers Association (AHC) from 2005 to 2009.

== Biography ==
Born Celesti Corbanese in Port-au-Prince, Haiti in 1942, Arnold Antonin is a film director and a university professor who also organizes debates and heads a cultural center. He was, from 2005 to 2009, the president of the Association of Haitian Movie Directors.

Arnold Antonin completed both primary and secondary school at an all boys catholic school called "Petit Séminaire Collège Saint-Martial" in the capital city of Haiti. During his youth he would regularly attend films at a popular theater complex in downtown Port-au-Prince. Antonin left for Europe after he completed his "etudes classiques" or high school in order to earn a bachelor's degree and in 1970 a doctorate degrees in economics from La Sapienza Facoltà, Università di Roma.

A man of diverse careers, Arnold Antonin is known both at home and abroad for his social, political, and cultural commitment. He was honored for his work with the Djibril Diop Mambety award at the International Film Festival in Cannes in 2002. He has received the Paul Robeson best film award three consecutive times at the African Diaspora FESPACO in Ouagadougou in 2007, 2009, and 2011. He has also received many awards at various festivals for his documentaries and fiction movies.

Antonin has been a judge at several international film festivals including Havana, Namur and FESPACO. He was honored for his work and for his documentary Women of Courage at the Cannes Festival in 2002.

In 1975 he directed the film Haiti, The way to Freedom (Ayiti, men chimin Libete) a documentary critical of the Jean-Claude Duvalier dictatorship which was shown around the world. The film was the first Haitian feature-length movie and it details the Haitian people's search for freedom from the native Taino's battle against the Spanish conquest to the oppressive Duvalier rule. Antonin spent several years in exile and returned to Haiti in 1986 after the fall of the dictatorship. He created the community center Petion Bolivar, a center that promotes culture and political debates. He organizes debates regularly under the name Thursday's Public Forum (Forum Libre du Jeudi).

When Baby Doc was overthrown in 1986, Antonin came back to Haiti. At first he focused on human rights issues, he created the Réseau National de Défense des Droits Humains (National Human Rights Defense Network, or RNDDH) with the support of UNESCO in December 1986. Also in 1986, Arnold Antonin constructed the Centre Pétion-Bolivar, a nonprofit educational foundation based in Pétionville, a suburb of Port-au-Prince. The non-profit cultural center subsidized, among other things, the production of documentaries and feature films by Haitians, about Haiti. Many of Arnold's own films were supported by the centre. The Centre Pétion Bolivar closed in March, 2020, after 34 years due to financial constraints which were worsened by the coronavirus pandemic. After the creation of these organizations, which are still important even over 20 years later, Antonin became increasingly engaged in politics.

As someone who is very engaged in Haiti's socio-political scene, Antonin many times shows the counties socio-political and economic problems through the men in his films. While the women are portrayed as the guiding lights away from violence and political corruption. Arnold Antonin even created his 2006 film "Le President a-t-il le Sida" to acknowledge the stigma Haitians held towards AIDS and to encourage them to get tested as well as to view the disease as treatable.

Antonin has produced and directed more than forty documentaries and two films, Piwouli (Piwouli and the Zenglendo) and Does The President Have Aids (Le président a-t-il le Sida?) starring Jimmy Jean-Louis who plays The Haitian in the American television series Heroes.

1942: Born Celesti Corbanese in Port-au-Prince, Haiti.

1970: Obtains a doctorate in economics and commerce at the University of Rome.

1974: Made his first film: Duvalier accusé, a black and white short film of 20 min. Shot in 16mm.

1975: Directs Ayiti, men chimen libète, a film in which he tours the world as part of the mobilization against the Duvalier dictatorship. This 120-minute feature film is in black and white. It was shot in 16mm.

1980: His film Un Tonton Macoute peut-il être un poète? wins the award for best short film in Caracas, Venezuela.

1983: Receives a master's degree in economic and international law from the Central University of Venezuela while also teaching there.

1986: Found and directed the Pétion Bolivar Center and becomes one of Haiti's most prominent human rights defenders and politicians.

1987: Starts the Libre du Jeudi forum, a pluralist space for meetings and debates.

1988: Starts working on a video, creating a documentary on his 20 years of working with the poor.

1992: Publicly withdraws from the political scene, presenting a self-critical explanation, surprising all of Haiti.

2001: After his film «A nayif nan peyi kout baton» which in 1976 won the special jury prize at the French-speaking film festival, he made his first documentary on Haitian artists like Tiga: Haiti, rêve, possession, creation, folie. A 52-minute movie, this film was broadcast by RFO and in the video section of the Saint Barthélémy Caribbean Film Festival.

2002: Honored at the Cannes Film Festival for his body of work and for his documentary Courage de femmes, as part of the Djibril Diop Mambety Prize.

2009: At the Fespaco awards in Ouagadougou, Burkina Faso, Arnold Antonin presented his documentary Jacques Roumain: la Passion d'un Pays. He received the Paul Robeson Award in the "Feature Film of the African Diaspora" section.

2011: At Fespaco 2011, Ouagadougou Pan-African Cinema and Television Festival, Arnold Antonin presents his documentary The Loves of a Zombie or can a Zombie be President?. This is one of his only films available in English, Spanish, French and creole. He received the Paul Robeson Award in the "Feature Film of the African Diaspora" section.

== Awards ==
- 1975 Festival of Havana Festival of Havana
- 2002 Djibril Diop Mambety for Women of Courage at the Cannes Festival.
- 2006 FESPACO Special Award Of the Committee of Struggle against aids of Burkina Faso Does the Président have AIDS?
- 2006 Festival Vues d'Afrique de Montreal Mention speciale du Jury Does the Président have AIDS?
- 2007 FESPACO Paul Robeson prize for Does the President Have Aids?
- 2009 FESPACO Paul Robeson prize for Jacques Roumain: The Passion for a Country
- 2011 FESPACO Paul Robeson prize for The loves of a zombi or can a zombi be president?
- 2011 MPAH Haiti Movie Awards Lifetime Achievement Award * Motion Picture Association of Haiti
- 2021 Haiti International Film Festival Arnold Antonin was honored as the Father of Haitian Cinema
- 2022 Best documentary for Jean-Jacques Dessalines, the man who defeated Napoleon Bonaparte at 7th Annual Haiti International Film Festival
- 2023 Prix Documentaire for Jean-Jacques Dessalines, the man who defeated Napoleon Bonaparte at the 39th Vues d'Afrique festival, Montreal Canadsa
- 2024: Prix Court Métrage Documentaire for The sublime and melancholic kitsch of Lionel St Eloi at the 28e edition of the Festival International du Film (FEMI)de la Guadeloupe
- 2024: Prix Documentaire for Anténor Firmin Between the sword and the pen or the equality of human races at the 28e edition of the Festival International du Film (FEMI)de la Guadeloup

== Filmography ==
- 1974: Duvalier accused, 20min., 16 mm.
- 1975: Duvalier condemned, 40 min. 16 mm.
- 1975: Haiti, The Way to Freedom. (First long shotage Haïtian movie)
- 1976: Naive Art and Repression in Haïti, 45 min. Color 16 mm.
- 1981: Can a Tonton Macoute be a poet ?, 35 min. Color 16 mm.
- 1984: The Right to Speak, (Radio Haïti, 1980) 15 min. Color 16 mm.
- 1988: 20 Years of Work with the Poors, 45 min. Video.
- 1988: The Manioc and the Life of Maréchal, 40 min. Video.
- 1989: Drugs don’t Forgive! 15 min. Video.
- 1989: Children’s Rights 15 min. Video.
- 1993: Port-au-Prince World War III has already happened. 15 min. Video.
- 1998: What is a Union? 20 min. Video.
- 1999: Citizen’s Rights 20 min. Video.
- 2000: A Woman’s Courage 17 min. Video.
- 2001: Tiga: Haïti, Dream, Possession, Creation, Folly. 52min. Video.
- 2001: Beauty against Poverty at Jalousie. 13 min. Video.
- 2001: The Lantern Maker. 14 min. Video.
- 2001: Old People’s Dignity. 15 min. Video.
- 2002: Piwouli and the Zenglendo. 90 min. Video.
- 2002: Cédor or the beauty of being modest. 39 min. Video.
- 2003: Albert Mangonès, public space. 52 min. Video.
- 2003: André Pierre, the one who paints what’s good. 26 min. Video.
- 2003: Ti Machin, the woman mechanic. 13 min. VVideo.
- 2003: Youth, sexuality and Aids: three 2 min vignettes. Video.
- 2003: Youth Carnival against AIDS at Jacmel. 15 min. Video.
- 2003: Remembering, Dahomeen Community of Vodoo. 13 min. Video.
- 2003: All Children are Children. 13 min. Video.
- 2004: I don’t want to give HIV/AIDS to my child. 13 min. Video.
- 2004: Economy of survival in Haiti. 26min. Video.
- 2004: GNB against Attila, 120 min. color. Video.
- 2006: Le President a-t-il Le Sida? 123 min, color. Video.
- 2006: Children in Danger. 10 min, color. Video.
- 2007: Préfete Duffaut, piety and urban imagination, 30 min., color, vidéo.
- 2007: Aubelin de Jolicoeur, Mister Haïti, 26 min., color, vidéo..
- 2008: Jacques Roumain: The Passion for a Country 118 min, color
- 2008: Five true stories, 30’, color. Video.
- 2008: To build the future, 30’, color. Video.
- 2009: Loves of a zombi, fiction, 1 h. 30’, color. Video.
- 2009: To know is to be able to, 20’, color. Video.
- 2009: Can sculpture save the village of Noailles? 32 min, color. Video.
- 2010: The January 12th Earthquake or Haïti: apocalypse now, 18 min, color. Video.
- 2010: The blue planet of Lucner Lazard, 23 min, color. Video.
- 2010: Once upon a time Pericles 6 min, color. Video.
- 2011: Six femmes d’exception 88 min., color, Vidéo.
- 2012: Herby, Jazz and Haitian Music 82 min., color DVD French and Creole subtitled in English and Spanish
- 2012: Gerard Gourgue: the man who could have changed the course of history 122 min., color DVD French and Creole subtitled in English and Spanish
- 2013: The Kingdom of Impunity 65 min, color, DVD French and Creole subtitled in English and Spanish
- 2013: Le miroir brisé de Valcin II Color/DVD/24 minutes/French
- 2014: Georges Corvington: Port-au-Prince, my unique and only lovwe 52 min, color, DVD, French and Creole with subtitles/voice over in English and Spanish
- 2015: Journey through Franketienne's worlds 86 min color, DVD, French and Creole with subtitles/voice over in English and Spanish
- 2016: René Depestre : We can't miss an Eternal Life 120 min color, DVD, French and Creole with subtitles/voice over in English and Spanish
- 2016: Lafortune Félix, le dernier des grands peintres de l’Artibonite Color/DVD/20 minutes/French
- 2016: Jambes de bois ou Gérard Fortuné, le dernier des naïfs Color/DVD/20 minutes/French
- 2017: Bernard Diederich, the Tusitala, narrates Haïti 26 min color, DVD, French and Creole with subtitles/voice over in English and Spanish
- 2019: Anthony Phelps à la frontière du texte 79 min color, DVD, French only
- 2019: Atis kap taye banda nan lari Pòtoprens/Heureux sculpteurs des rues de Port-au-Prince Color/DVD/86 minutes/Haitian Creole/French
- 2020: Thus Spoke the Sea, DVD, color, 49mn, Haitian Creole subtitled in English
- 2021: Levoy Exil and his court or Bliss at the Tip of the Paintbrush, DVD, Color, 27 minutes in Haitian-Creole, subtitled in French and English.
- 2022: Jean-Jacques Dessalines: the man who defeated Napoleon Bonaparte, 2022/USB/1h34min French & Creole with subtitles in French, English & Spanish.
- 2022: The sublime and melancholic kitsch of Lionel St Eloi, USB flash drive – 22mm49 - Creole and French, subtitled in French and English
- 2023 : Pepe Mujica, Nelson Mandela & Haïti, 61 min. USB, couleur
- 2024 : Anténor Firmin Between the sword and the pen or the equality of human races 78 min USB
- 2024 : Haïti-Chili, le choc et la rencontre, 77 min., USB, couleur
- 2025 : Haiti Papam Habebit ? Will the next pope be haitien?, 120 min, couleurs USB
- 2025 : "The children musicians of St Suzanne" USB/1h01mn/French with subtitles in English

== Prizes, Festivals and other achievements ==
Participation in many congressional seminars and international conferences. In 1975 Arnold won an Arabic critics prize in Geneva for his film (Ayiti, men chimin Libete).

In 1976 he won a prize at the Francophone FiFEF Festival in New Orleans for Naive Art and Repression in Haiti

In 1980, his movie "Un Tonton Macoute peut-il être un poète?" was praised as poetic. The movie got the prize for being the best short film in Caracas, Venezuela for that year.

In 1982 Antonin received a special mention at the Mérida Cine Festival for "Un Tonton Macoute peut-il être un poète?".

Also in 1982, Arnold wrote and published a book centered around the history of Haitian cinema. It is called Matériel pour une préhistoire du cinéma haïtien (Material for a prehistory of Haitian cinema).

In 1983 he received a master's degree in Economics and International Law from the Central University of Venezuela while also teaching there.

In 1983 he received another special mention for his role as a jury at the International Festival of the New Latin American Cinema of Havana for "Haiti, the path of freedom."

In 2001 after his film "Nayif Nan Peyi Kout Baton" obtained a special Jury prize at the Francophone Film Festival in 1976, he created his first documentary on Haitian artists with Tiga a famous Haitian painter. Mr. Antonin addressed the Haitian dream, creation and madness. The film turned out to be 52 minutes. It was broadcast by RFO and in the video section of the Caribbean Film Festival of Saint Barthélémy.

In 2007, his documentary made the previous year called "Le president a-t-il le sida", was selected for the Caribbean Films Itinerant Festival.

On January 20, 2011, UNESCO organized a round table in Paris to celebrate Haiti. They then projected six of Arnold Antonin's films in the presence of the director.

He has been a member of several international juries for films in Havana, Caribbean Images, Namur, Ouagadougou Fespaco, Oaxaca México, Bogota, Sugar (Bolivia).
