= Pacifica Foundation =

American radio organization founded in 1946

Pacifica Network
- Type: Public radio network
- Country: United States
- Broadcast area: Nationwide
- Headquarters: Los Angeles, California

Ownership
- Owner: Pacifica Foundation

History
- Founded: 1946; 80 years ago by Lewis Hill and E. John Lewis
- Launch date: April 15, 1949 (77 years ago)

Coverage
- Availability: Global

Links
- Website: www.pacifica.org

Pacifica Foundation is an American nonprofit organization that owns five independently operated, noncommercial, listener-supported radio stations known for their progressive/liberal political orientation. Its national headquarters adjoins station KPFK in North Hollywood, California.

Pacifica Foundation also operates the Pacifica Network, a program service that supplies more than 200 affiliated stations with various programs, primarily news and public affairs. It was the first public radio network in the United States and is one of the world's oldest listener-funded radio networks. Programs such as Democracy Now! and Free Speech Radio News have been some of its most popular productions.

== Early history ==
Pacifica was founded in 1946 by pacifists E. John Lewis and Lewis Hill. During World War II, both of them had filed for conscientious objector status. The foundation was created as an alternative to commercial broadcasting, with listener support intended to fund radio programming without relying on advertisers or educational institutions.

After the war, Lewis, Hill and a small group of former conscientious objectors created the Pacifica Foundation in the town of Pacifica, California, in the San Francisco Bay Area. Its first station, KPFA in Berkeley, began broadcasting on April 15, 1949. By 1977, the network had added WBAI in New York City, KPFK in Los Angeles, WPFW in Washington, DC, and KPFT in Houston.

=== FCC v. Pacifica Foundation ===
In 1973, one of Pacifica's stations, WBAI, broadcast comedian George Carlin's Filthy Words routine uncensored. Following a listener complaint, Pacifica received a letter of reprimand from the FCC, censuring it for allegedly violating broadcast regulations that prohibited airing indecent material. The foundation took the matter to the U.S. Supreme Court in FCC v. Pacifica Foundation and lost in a 5–4 decision. This became a landmark moment in the history of free speech, and the case continues to define the power of the government over broadcast material it calls indecent.

== Governance ==
=== Pacifica national board ===
The Pacifica Foundation is governed by a national board of directors. Under the foundation’s bylaws, each local station board elects directors from among its members to serve on the national board.

=== Local station boards ===
During two years of each three-year cycle, subscribers and station staff at each station vote to elect local station board members, as required by the Pacifica Foundation bylaws. The local station boards have support and advisory duties for their station. They also elect members from their body to serve on the Pacifica Foundation's national board of directors. The full local station board meets monthly, and its committees meet on both regular and ad hoc bases.

== Internal conflicts ==
=== 1990s–2002 ===
For most of its history, Pacifica gave each of its stations independent control of programming. During the 1990s, a major controversy arose over rumors that the Pacifica National Board and national staff were attempting to centralize control of content, to increase audience. The rumors included accusations that the board proposed changing the network's funding model away from a reliance exclusively on listener donations and toward a mix of listener donations and corporate foundation funding similar to that of NPR. There were also accusations that the Board was considering selling both KPFA and WBAI in New York City, which operate on commercial-band FM frequencies (94.1 and 99.5, respectively) worth hundreds of millions of dollars.

This led to years of conflict, including court cases, public demonstrations, firings and strikes of station staff, whose common plight inspired creation of Radio4all.net to preserve what they saw as the original spirit of Pacifica. Many listeners of the individual stations, especially KPFA and WBAI, objected to what they saw as an attempt to tone down the overtly left-leaning political content on Pacifica stations. The controversy included highly publicized ideologically charged disputes between grassroots listener organizations and Mary Frances Berry, a former chairperson of the U.S. Commission on Civil Rights, who chaired Pacifica's national board at the time.

The board eventually was embroiled in counter-lawsuits by board members and listener-sponsors and, after global settlement of the lawsuits in November 2001, an interim board was formed to craft new bylaws, which it did in two tumultuous years of national debates among thousands of listener-sponsors and activists, finally giving listener-sponsors the right and responsibility to elect new Local Station Boards at each of the five Pacifica stations. These local boards in turn elect the national board of directors. Aside from some minor changes, the same 2003 bylaws remain in effect today.

=== 2002–2009 ===
Pacifica National News director Dan Coughlin (director) was voted Interim Executive Director of the network in 2002 (the "Interim" was later dropped). The years of internal legal battles and financial mismanagement had taken a toll. In 2005, Coughlin resigned, the network was still largely disorganized, and Pacifica reverted to operating with an interim executive director for most of the year.

In January 2006, Pacifica hired Greg Guma as the next executive director of the Pacifica Foundation. By the end of the year, the Foundation had fully recovered its financial health and had launched two new national programs: Informativo Pacifica, a daily Spanish Language newscast, and From the Vault, a weekly program drawn from Pacifica's extensive audio archives. Pacifica also produced Informed Dissent, a ten-week series for the 2006 mid-term elections that drew from talent across the network. Guma left his post in September 2007.

Pacifica's National Board unanimously chose former KPFA general manager Nicole Sawaya as the next executive director. Sawaya had been among the staff members fired by the national board in 1999 amidst Pacifica's internal crisis. Sawaya began her tenure as executive director in mid-November 2007, but abruptly changed her mind two weeks later. Pacifica historian Matthew Lasar said she "found the level of internecine dysfunction at Pacifica overwhelming, and fled her job." The Pacifica National Board spent the next several months negotiating with her, and Sawaya resumed her job on March 5, 2008. She resigned effective September 30, citing "dysfunctional" governance and "shoddy and opaque" business practices that had plunged the organization into a financial crisis.

Sawaya's departure was followed by major staff layoffs. In 2009, Pacifica Board chair Grace Aaron became interim executive director, former board member LaVarn Williams replaced Lonnie Hicks as chief financial officer, and the national office took control of WBAI in New York. Aaron appointed Williams acting GM of WBAI in May, and Hicks filed a lawsuit against the foundation alleging that he was dismissed because he is African American and a whistleblower.

=== Financial situation in the 2010s ===
On August 9, 2013, Pacifica interim executive director Summer Reese announced that due to financial problems, Pacifica-owned radio station WBAI-FM in New York was laying off about two-thirds of its staff, effective August 12, 2013. The entire news department was reportedly included in the layoff.

After Pacifica's board of directors completed the 2016 board year with the exclusion of 75% of WBAI's board representation, it then moved to decertify Pacifica's 2016 board elections, which had been won handily by the independent faction not in power. The new 2017 board of directors replaced interim executive director Lydia Brazon with KPFT director Bill Crosier and reinstated WBAI's delegation.

On Friday, October 6, 2017, Pacifica lost a $1.8 million settlement over what they claimed was price gouging by Empire State Realty Trust (ESRT), which had been raising antenna rental charges for WBAI at 9% per year for the last 12 years under a 15-year lease WBAI signed in 2005 that did not expire until 2020. The rent was set at more than half a million dollars annually, which Pacifica claimed was approximately 4 times the current market rent for Midtown Manhattan antenna rentals. Pacifica Radio's WBAI has housed its transmitter on the Empire State Building since 1966. The 9% annual rental increases were facilitated by the destruction of the twin towers on September 11, 2001, which dramatically reduced space available for comparable antennas. The ruling encumbered all of Pacifica's assets including KPFA and KPFB in Berkeley, KPFK in Los Angeles, WPFW in Washington, DC, and KPFT in Houston in addition to WBAI in New York City but does not affect the assets of any of its affiliates. On April 6, 2018, The Pacifica Foundation announced the settlement on a series of agreements that release WBAI, the organization's New York radio station, from a court judgment as well as the last two years of its lease at the Empire State Building as of May 31, 2018. The Foundation later completed an agreement to relocate its transmission facility to a new site nearby.

On October 8, 2019, it was announced that WBAI's local operations were abruptly shut down. Their programming was superseded by Pacifica Across America: a compilation of work from sister stations and other sources; Democracy Now! continued to be broadcast.

The 2019 WBAI shutdown was litigated in the fall of 2019. The New York State Supreme Court ruled in November 2019 that the WBAI shutdown by then-executive director John Vernile was executed "ultra vires" (without the proper authority) and ordered the station re-opened.

In April 2024, the FCC entered into a consent decree with Pacifica involving WBAI’s compliance with underwriting and sponsorship-identification rules. Under the agreement, Pacifica agreed to pay a $25,000 penalty, accept a short-term two-year license renewal for WBAI and implement a compliance plan across its stations.

== Programs ==
=== Democracy Now! ===
A show that for years has been considered the flagship of Pacifica Radio's national programming is Democracy Now!, an independent news organization that covers democracy, human rights and justice issues, and questions the motives of U.S. foreign and domestic policy. Hosted by Amy Goodman and Juan González, this program is a compilation of news, interviews, and documentaries. Democracy Now! is heard and seen on more than 700 radio and TV stations across the U.S. including public-access television stations and satellite television channels Free Speech TV and Link TV. WDEV, based in Waterbury, Vermont, is the only commercial radio station in the U.S. that carries the program—even though it is also heard in north-central Vermont over Pacifica affiliate WGDR in Plainfield and its sister station, WGDH in Hardwick.

In 2002, as Pacifica implemented its new listener-sponsor-accountability structure and as Pacifica and Democracy Now! settled outstanding disputes from previous years, Democracy Now! spun off with substantial funding from Pacifica to become an independent production.

=== Other Pacifica programming: 2000–2006 ===
The Pacifica network, in addition to extensive community-based productions at its various stations around the United States, also featured a daily half-hour radio newscast called Free Speech Radio News (FSRN) from 2003 to 2013. FSRN was founded by Pacifica Reporters Against Censorship, a group of mostly Pacifica Network News reporters who went on strike against the Pacifica national board's policies of the late 1990s.

FSRN was primarily funded by Pacifica, and included headlines and news features produced by reporters based around the U.S. and in scores of countries around the world. In September 2013, the board of directors of FSRN issued a lay-off notice to all staff, and confirmed that their last broadcast would take place on September 27, 2013. The board cited financial difficulties as the reason for the decision.

In 2006, Pacifica added two new national programs: From the Vault from the Pacifica Radio Archives, a weekly program that thematically repackages archival material, making it relevant to contemporary listeners; and Informativo Pacifica, based at KPFK in Los Angeles, a daily Spanish-language newscast that includes reporters from the U.S. and many Latin American countries.

=== Initiatives 2007–2008 ===
- In 2007, the Federal Communications Commission (FCC) announced that it would accept new applications for non-commercial radio licenses for the first time in more than a decade. In response, Pacifica joined forces with other advocates for independent media in the "Radio for People" campaign, helping local groups apply for these full-power licenses.
- Pacifica has expanded its schedule of national special broadcasts, distributing more audio documentaries, covering the Attorney General Alberto Gonzales hearings live, and sending production teams to the United States Social Forum and the National Conference for Media Reform.
- Pacifica expanded its offerings in multiple media platforms, using "Web 2.0" technology. In September 2007, one interactive website, KPFA's Warcomeshome.org, began to offer hard-hitting stories from reporter Aaron Glantz about the human costs of the Iraq War, as well as innovative ways of contributing to, and distributing information about, the impact of the conflict.
- Pacifica suspended regular programming for three days to air a live broadcast of the Iraq War Winter Soldier event in Silver Spring, Maryland from March 14 through March 16, 2008. The broadcast was co-anchored by journalist Aaron Glantz and KPFA Morning Show host Aimee Allison.

=== Recent programming ===
Local Pacifica stations produce many programs that are available to network stations and affiliates. These include: Sprouts, a weekly showcase of producers and stations around the network, often in documentary format, Explorations in Science with Dr. Michio Kaku, a weekly radio program on science, politics, and the environment, Dennis Bernstein's Flashpoints, a daily drive-time public affairs program, Against The Grain, a progressive and radical commentary program, and many other regular programs.

Pacifica also produces a wide variety of special broadcasts, including live coverage of major U.S. Congressional hearings, national mobilizations against war, and other important events, such as the United States Social Forum. Special programs also include news documentaries, holidays and commemorations, and archival audio from the Pacifica Radio Archives.

Pacifica distributes program content via the Audioport system.

== Pacifica Radio Archives ==
The Pacifica Radio Archives, housed at station KPFK in Los Angeles, is the oldest public radio archive in the United States documenting more than five decades of grassroots political, cultural and performing arts history. The archive includes recordings of interviews with John Coltrane, James Baldwin, Lorraine Hansberry, and Langston Hughes, among many others. The Pacifica Radio Archives were featured in their own 30-minute slot on BBC Radio 5 Live's (now defunct) Up All Night program.

== Pacifica-owned stations ==
The Pacifica-owned stations are listed below in alphabetical order by state and community of license.

Note: All stations except for WBAI were built and signed-on by the Pacifica Foundation.

City of license/market	Station	Owned since
Berkeley, California (San Francisco Bay Area)	KPFA–94.1	1949
Berkeley, California (San Francisco Bay Area)	KPFB–89.3	1954
Los Angeles	KPFK–90.7	1959
New York City	WBAI–99.5	1960
Houston	KPFT–90.1	1970
Washington, D.C.	WPFW–89.3	1977

== See also ==
- FCC v. Pacifica Foundation
- List of Pacifica Radio stations and affiliates
- Radio4all.net
- National Federation of Community Broadcasters
