= Winter Soldier Investigation =

1971 anti-Vietnam War event in Detroit, Michigan

The "Winter Soldier Investigation" was a media event sponsored by the Vietnam Veterans Against the War (VVAW) from January 31, 1971, to February 2, 1971. It was intended to publicize war crimes and atrocities by the United States Armed Forces and their allies in the Vietnam War. The VVAW challenged the morality and conduct of the war by showing the direct relationship between military policies and war crimes in Vietnam. The three-day gathering of 109 veterans and 16 civilians took place in Detroit, Michigan. Discharged servicemen from each branch of the armed forces, as well as civilian contractors, medical personnel and academics, all gave testimony about war crimes they had committed or witnessed during the years 1963–1970.

With the exception of Pacifica Radio, the event was not covered extensively outside Detroit. However, several journalists and a film crew recorded the event, and a documentary film titled Winter Soldier was released in 1972. A complete transcript was later entered into the Congressional Record by Senator Mark Hatfield, and discussed in the Fulbright Hearings in April and May 1971, convened by Senator J. William Fulbright, chair of the United States Senate Committee on Foreign Relations.

== Background ==
Prompted by numerous investigations into war crimes such as the Russell Tribunal, National Veterans Inquiry and Citizens Commission of Inquiry (CCI), the Vietnam Veterans Against the War wanted to have a large scale public hearing. With the courts martial for the My Lai Massacre making front-page news, and the recent disclosure by members of the Central Intelligence Agency's Phoenix Program of its record of human rights violations in Vietnam, the VVAW was determined to expose a broad pattern of war crimes in Vietnam. The Winter Soldier Investigation (WSI) was intended to prove that massacres like the My Lai were not isolated and rare occurrences, but were instead the frequent and predictable result of official American war policy.

=== Organizers ===
The groundwork for what would become the Winter Soldier Investigation was laid by Jeremy Rifkin, Tod Ensign, Michael Uhl and Bob Johnson of CCI. In search of first-hand information on war crimes, they contacted the Vietnam Veterans Against the War and gained the support of VVAW co-founder Jan Crumb. During the summer of 1970, the CCI were approached by Al Hubbard who had become a full-time organizer with VVAW. Hubbard suggested that CCI combine their efforts with Jane Fonda, Rev. Dick Fernandez of Clergy and Laymen Concerned about Vietnam (CALCAV), Mark Lane, and Donald Duncan (who had previously testified at the Russell Tribunal in Denmark). An initial steering committee was formed, consisting of Duncan, Ensign, Fonda, Lane, Hubbard, Rifkin and Fernandez, and continued to organize the WSI through September, 1970.

Among the growing collective of organizers, differences of opinion and direction arose concerning the planned public event. VVAW leaders felt it should be an all-veteran event, to maintain its credibility. Less than three months into planning for the Winter Soldier Investigation, most of the Vietnam veteran organizers and Jeremy Rifkin had become adamant that WSI disassociate itself from Mark Lane. CCI staffers criticized Lane as being arrogant and sensationalistic, and said the book he was writing had "shoddy reporting in it." The CCI leaders refused to work with Lane further and gave the VVAW leaders a "Lane or us" ultimatum. VVAW did not want to lose the monetary support of Lane and Fonda, so the CCI split from the project. The following month, after caustic reviews of Lane's book by authors and a Vietnam expert, VVAW would also distance itself from Lane just one month before the event. Lane had recently published a book, Conversations with Americans, in which Lane relied on unverified interviews with thirty three servicemen, four of whom were later exposed as unreliable by Neil Sheehan in a New York Times book review. Leaders of VVAW feared involvement with Lane would tarnish the credibility of the WSI. A new steering committee was created without Lane, but he was allowed to continue with fundraising events and was available for legal counsel. The new six-member steering committee for WSI was composed of three national office leaders (Al Hubbard, Craig Scott Moore and Mike Oliver) and three members of the growing list of chapters (Art Flesch, Tim Butz, and William F. Crandell). Organizers hoped Lane would keep a low profile during the event, and he did, as he spent his time flying around the country defending his book. Ultimately, the WSI was an event produced by veterans only, without the need of "so-called experts" such as Lane and Fonda.

After the organizers of the national hearings separated into two groups, they each developed their own events. The CCI advanced its plans for a December event in Washington, D.C., while the WSI's new organizers continued with the original plan to hold its hearings in Detroit. The Washington, DC, event would be called the National Veterans Inquiry. The Detroit event would be called the Winter Soldier Investigation. Seven of the 142 total participants would provide testimony at both events.

The support of antiwar celebrities was considered crucial to generate both money and publicity. A series of benefit productions, Acting in Concert for Peace, were created and featured performances by Jane Fonda, Dick Gregory, Donald Sutherland and Barbara Dane. Two concerts by Crosby and Nash, as well as folk singer Phil Ochs, also raised funds.

The WSI also relied on considerable support from the Detroit community. Dean A. Robb and Ernie Goodman solicited donations from their fellow local attorneys and several clergymen arranged housing for the witnesses. In the words of the Director of Missions for the Detroit Metropolitan Council of Churches, Dr. John B Forsyth, "It is important that the public realize that American atrocities in Vietnam are an every day [sic] occurrence." The Secretary-Treasurer for the United Auto Workers, Emil Mazey and Michigan Secretary of State Richard Austin also helped raise funds for the event.

=== Purpose ===
The purpose of the Winter Soldier Investigation was to show that American policies in Vietnam had led to war crimes. In the words of one participant veteran, Donald Dzagulones,

"We gathered not to sensationalize our service but to decry the travesty that was Lt. William Calley's trial for the My Lai Massacre. The U.S. had established the principle of culpability with the Nuremberg trials of the Nazis. Following those principles, we held that if Calley were responsible, so were his superiors up the chain of command – even to the president. The causes of My Lai and the brutality of the Vietnam War were rooted in the policies of our government as executed by our military commanders."

The name "Winter Soldier Investigation" was proposed by Mark Lane, and was derived as a contrast to what Thomas Paine described as a "summer soldier" in the opening lines of his first American Crisis paper, written in December 1776. When future Senator and Secretary of State John Kerry, then a decorated Lieutenant in the Naval Reserve (Inactive), later spoke before a Senate Committee, he explained,

"We who have come here to Washington have come here because we feel we have to be winter soldiers now. We could come back to this country; we could be quiet; we could hold our silence; we could not tell what went on in Vietnam, but we feel because of what threatens this country, the fact that the crimes threaten it, not reds, and not redcoats but the crimes which we are committing that threaten it, that we have to speak out."

=== Planning ===
The collecting of testimony from veterans had begun under the auspice of the CCI the previous year, and it took almost two months of on-site planning in Detroit to organize the conference. Detroit was proposed by Fonda because of its central location in the American heartland, and the "blue-collar" social status of most of the residents. The steering committee set up a collective in a house on the industrial east side of Detroit with the help of Catholic antiwar activists; and five clergymen of different denominations, including the director of missions for the Detroit Metropolitan Council of Churches, offered housing for the witnesses.

The program consisted primarily of testimony, with 109 Vietnam veterans to appear on panels arranged by unit so they could corroborate each other's reports. Grouping these veterans by unit would also help to establish that events and practices to which they testified were unit-wide policy, and not just random and rare occurrences. Several civilian experts who had been to Vietnam were also to speak during this event. Arrangements had been made to include the testimony of several expatriated Vietnamese students residing in Canada, but they were denied visas to the United States by the Canadian government.

Organizers also investigated the legal implications of veterans publicly admitting to criminal acts which they had witnessed or participated in. With legal advice from the Center for Constitutional Rights, the organizers were assured that the armed forces could not charge or try veterans for crimes committed while they were on active duty. The veterans giving testimony were also instructed not to reveal the specific names of others involved in war crimes. The goal of these hearings was not to indict individual soldiers, but instead to expose the frequency of criminal behavior and its relationship to U.S. war policy.

== Credibility of the veterans and their testimony ==
=== Verifying the participants ===
The organizers of the Winter Soldier Investigation took several steps to ensure the validity of the participants. Each veteran's authenticity was checked before the hearings by the investigation event organizers, and subsequently by reporters and United States Department of Defense (DoD) officials. In addition, they also gave specific details about their units and the locations where the events had occurred. Those who wanted to testify were carefully screened by the officers of VVAW, and care was taken to verify the service records and testimony of the veterans. After the severe criticism of the accuracy of Mark Lane's book about atrocities a month before the event, the organizers of the Winter Soldier Investigation made the credibility of the participants a top priority. As noted by one VVAW leader, "The lesson is that we'd better do our work right. We'd better talk to these vets and weed out the bullshitters so that we can't get set up, because we're going to come under attack. We're going to do this right." All veterans participating in Winter Soldier were required to bring their discharge papers (DD-214s) and IDs.

The identifying military affiliation of each veteran testifying, including in almost all cases, the dates of service, appears on the roster for each panel that was included with the testimony in the Congressional Record.

A later search of the service records of at least 2 of the participants found that they could not have been in the claimed location on the relevant date.

=== Verifying the testimony ===
The organizers had two primary concerns when considering the testimony they would use. They wanted testimony that would not allow the scapegoating of individuals when they were attempting to show what was being done in Vietnam was due to policy, not decisions by individual GIs. They also wanted the testimony to be accurate, and double and sometimes triple confirmed by others in the same units. Specific sets of questions were drafted by experienced combat vets to help verify that participants were not fabricating their stories or faking their knowledge, and that only the strongest testimony was used.

According to Army reports compiled by the Criminal Investigation Command (CID) and later reported by the Village Voice following declassification, the Army found the allegations made by 46 veterans at the hearings to merit further inquiry. As of March 1972, the CID reported successfully locating 36 of the people who had testified, 31 of whom submitted to interviews.

One WSI participant, Jamie Henry, had reported the massacre he described at the hearings to the Army, which investigated and subsequently confirmed his story. However, the details of the investigation were not made public until 2006, when the Los Angeles Times published the declassified information.

=== Efforts to discredit the WSI ===
Months before the WSI event, the organizers anticipated heavy scrutiny and attacks on their credibility, and they prepared for it. Although military documentation was provided, some media organizations such as the Detroit News tried to discredit the hearings on the very first day of testimony by questioning the authenticity of the 109 testifying veterans. Discharge papers were examined; military records were checked against DoD records; after all their digging, it was claimed that not one fraudulent veteran was found. The Detroit Free Press reported daily of participants who had been confirmed by the DoD as veterans.

As noted in VVAW records, each veteran's authenticity and testimony were also checked shortly after the hearings by Nixon's "plumbers." Charles Colson was assigned the task. In a confidential "Plan to Counteract Viet Nam Veterans Against the War," Colson wrote, "The men that participated in the pseudo-atrocity hearings in Detroit will be checked to ascertain if they are genuine combat veterans." At one point, the Nixon team suggested in a memo about VVAW, "Several of their regional coordinators are former Kennedy supporters." VVAW was also targeted by the FBI for observation as a possible dissident organization.

The Nixon administration also attempted to rally pro-war veterans to counter VVAW. "What happened to the president's request that we take steps to mobilize veterans?" demanded White House Chief of Staff H. R. Haldeman to Colson just a few weeks after the WSI. "The President should know that we are continuing the effort to discredit VVAW," Colson assured Haldeman. Nixon aides formed the Vietnam Veterans for a Just Peace, according to Colson, as a "counterfoil" to Kerry and the VVAW, and they did everything they could to boost the group. John O'Neill, representing this group, made public appearances denouncing the antiwar veterans and promoting Nixon's Vietnamization policy. According to White House memos, Colson worked behind the scenes to get a Kerry-O'Neill debate on nationwide television. "Let's destroy this young demagogue before he becomes another Ralph Nader," he wrote, referring to Kerry.

Seven years after the hearings, writer Guenter Lewy claimed in his book, America in Vietnam, that allegations against Marines were investigated by the Naval Investigative Service. Lewy wrote that the report stated that some veterans contacted by the NIS said they did not attend the WSI hearing in Detroit or had never been to Detroit, and many refused to be interviewed. However, government officials have no record of the report and no other historian has seen it. Lewy later said that he could not recall if he had actually seen the alleged report or simply been told of its contents.

More than 30 years after the Winter Soldier Investigation, during the 2004 presidential campaign in which former VVAW spokesman and Navy veteran John Kerry was a candidate, the WSI was again in the news. Steve Pitkin, who participated at the investigation in 1971, now claimed just weeks before the presidential election at an anti-Kerry political rally that he was not originally planning to testify at the WSI, but was pressured by Kerry and others into testifying about rape, brutality, atrocities and racism. Pitkin also signed a 2004 affidavit making similar claims about Kerry, but after being challenged by other participants, admitted that his recollections were flawed. On 1971 archival film footage of the WSI panel, Pitkin criticized the press for its coverage of the war, and detailed what he considered poor training for combat in Vietnam, and low morale he claimed to have witnessed while there. Although he introduced himself by saying, "I'll testify about the beating of civilians and enemy personnel, destruction of villages, indiscriminate use of artillery, the general racism and the attitude of the American GI toward the Vietnamese," his actual testimony contained no such statements.

Upon hearing of these claims by Pitkin, another WSI participant named Scott Camil filed his own affidavit refuting Pitkin's statements. Pitkin has subsequently admitted his recollections were flawed, and has re-issued a second affidavit now reflecting a different date of discharge from the Army, different people traveling with him to the Winter Soldier event, and different circumstances under which he joined the VVAW.

Fritz Efaw, a Chapter Representative of VVAW, stated: "The claims that the WSI hearings contained falsified testimony from men who were not veterans is an old one, and it's definitely false. The testimony was startling even at the time it took place: startling to the general public, startling to the military and the Nixon administration and startling to those who participated because each of them knew a piece of the story, but the hearings brought a great many of them together for the first time and provided a venue in which they could be heard for the first time. It's hardly surprising that those on the other side would set out almost immediately to discredit them."

The U.S. participation in the Vietnam War was the source of much deeply divided sentiment among Americans. The Winter Soldier Investigation produced a conglomerate of testimony resulting in the implication and indictment of American leadership in criminal conduct, and thereby further drove a wedge between proponents and opponents of the war.

== Winter Soldier panels ==
See Opening statement excerpt in Wikiquote

The three days of testimony was presented by unit:

- Sunday, January 31, there were speakers from the 1st Marine Division, 3rd Marine Division and 1st Cavalry Division
- Monday, February 1, from the 101st Airborne Division and 5th Special Forces
- Tuesday, February 2, from the 25th Infantry Division, 1st Infantry Division, 4th Infantry Division, 9th Infantry Division and Lieutenant Calley's 23rd Infantry (Americal) Division

Other veterans testified to the treatment they received when held captive as POWs by the Vietcong (VC). In contrast to accounts of mistreatment described by prisoners of the People's Army of Vietnam (PAVN) in the north, the former prisoners speaking at the WSI said they were never physically abused, except for some rough handling during their capture. The VC provided enough food and medical attention to sustain them, and in the particular case of Sgt. George E. Smith, he claims "I usually had more food than I could eat," although he would often grow ill from intolerance. Smith admitted fearing for his life when he heard Hanoi Radio broadcasts saying VC soldiers were being executed in Saigon and the VC was promising to execute Americans in retaliation. Shortly afterward, two American prisoners held in the same camp with Smith are believed to have been executed in reprisal. At a press conference when Smith was released after two years as a POW, he made statements in support of the VC and against US involvement in Vietnam, and immediately faced court-martial charges for violation of Article 104 of the Uniform Code of Military Justice (aiding the enemy). The charges were dropped due to insufficient evidence, and five years later at the WSI, Smith said that he stood by his statements.

In addition to the testimony panels, the veterans also held open discussions on related subjects such as "What We Are Doing to Vietnam", "What We Are Doing to Ourselves", violations of international law, Prisoners of War, racism in the military, and also press censorship. Dr. Bert Pfeiffer of the University of Montana presented the first public testimony about the potential toxicity and health effects of the chemical Agent Orange. A special panel of psychiatrists was convened, many of whom had served in Vietnam, to discuss the impact of the war on American society. Midway through the hearings, the organizers insisted that no one make statements on behalf of the Vietnam veterans except for vets. It was presumed by reporters that this was to separate the participation of veterans from that of people like Mark Lane.

=== Testimony from veterans ===
Testimony given during the three-day event covered both broad policy concerns, such as the use of chemical agents, indiscriminate bombing and free-fire zones as well as more specific and unusual war crime incidents, including rape, torture and desecration of the dead. The testifying veterans were usually grouped by branch of military service and geographic location of service. Before launching into their detailed testimony, each gave a brief statement of personal information including rank, division, unit, length of service and a summary of what their testimony would cover. While only 109 veterans gave testimony, over 700 veterans attended the hearing. Excerpts from the testimony transcripts:

Stephen Craig: "...My testimony covers the maltreatment of prisoners, the suspects actually, and a convoy running down an old woman with no reason at all..."
Rusty Sachs: "...my testimony concerns the leveling of villages for no valid reason, throwing Viet Cong suspects from the aircraft after binding them and gagging them with copper wire..."
Scott Camil: "...My testimony involves burning of villages with civilians in them, the cutting off of ears, cutting off of heads, torturing of prisoners, calling in of artillery on villages for games, corpsmen killing wounded prisoners..."
Kenneth Campbell: "...My testimony will consist of eyewitnessing and participating in the calling in of artillery on undefended villages, mutilation of bodies, killing of civilians, mistreatment of civilians..."
Fred Nienke: "...My testimony includes killing of non-combatants, destruction of Vietnamese property and livestock, use of chemical agents and the use of torture in interpreting prisoners..."

After giving their brief initial statements, a moderator had each of them elaborate upon their testimony, and then the press and observers were given time to ask questions of the veterans.

=== What are we doing to ourselves? Panel ===
During the "What are we doing to ourselves?" panel, Robert J. Lifton spoke of the psychological impact the events in Vietnam had on returning soldiers. He pointed out how rampant disapproval was for the war and highlighted how that affected returning veteran:

So the returning veteran, who has a psychological need, as he returns from any war, to make his difficult transition into civilian life by in some way giving significance to what he did in his war, has no such opportunity, because he can't, in any way, inwardly approve of what he has done in this war. Nor can the rest of society find sources of pride for him or acceptance or necessity about this war. Both the veteran and the larger society see him the taint of this filthy, unnecessary, immoral war.

=== Racism and Third World Panels ===
Two of the discussion panels conducted with veterans during the Winter Soldier Investigations centered on racism in the American military. These panels addressed one source of resentment towards the Vietnam War by black soldiers, as "African Americans and Latinos paid a higher human price for the war". Studies have shown that black soldiers suffered disproportionately more casualties than white soldiers at the beginning of the war. Black veterans testifying at the WSI intended to show that racism by the U.S. military toward the Vietnamese, as well as toward non-whites within the military, were both extensions of the racism present in American society. Many veterans testified that black soldiers were demeaned by platoon leaders and refusal to comply to orders often led to beatings and starvation, and black soldiers were intentionally endangered by being placed as "point, rearguards, and side-guards". As a result of the attention brought to the significant disparity between white and black soldiers assigned to, and dying in, combat units, Pentagon officials implemented cutbacks in the number of blacks in combat positions. The fact that this racial inequality was taking place during the height of the Civil Rights Movement in the United States was of great significance.

African Americans were not the only ones subject to discrimination during the war. The American military portrayed Asians as "sub-human" as a means of providing justification for killing children and civilians. This notion was also projected into medical treatment of soldiers and POWs. Non-white patients were reported to have been operated on without anesthetic on several occasions. There is a specific case where the driver for a Medical Battalion describes incidents where Army of the Republic of Vietnam (ARVN) soldiers were treated without anesthetic. He recalls filling a syringe with anesthetic and setting it beside the doctor, only to later find out that it was never used when hearing the patient screaming.

The testimony given by the soldiers during the racism panel of the WSI was presented as evidence that the veterans were justified in their disapproval of the war, on the grounds that basic principles such as civil rights were not being upheld during the war. African Americans and Latinos expressed increasingly greater disapproval of the war than whites during its later stages.

=== Laos operation revealed ===
The previously secret two-week U.S. penetration into Laos in February 1969, which was part of Operation Dewey Canyon (primarily taking place in South Vietnam at the time), became a controversial subject at this event since the Pentagon had only days before denied that any American troops had crossed the Laotian border and carried out military operations. Five veterans from the 3rd Marine Regiment who had returned from the war were present at the WSI and refuted the claims of the Pentagon. They described their secret operations in Laos and also revealed that they were given meticulous orders to hide the fact that they were American including, but not limited to, the removal of identification from uniforms and switching to Russian arms that were typically used by the PAVN. They were also ordered to deny all knowledge of involvement of American troops in Laos. A Marine Corps spokesman persisted in issuing a statement at the WSI saying, "no platoons or any large number of Marines ever crossed the border." This quickly prompted investigations by American media such as the Detroit Free Press, St. Louis Post-Dispatch and The Boston Globe, which were successful in turning up testimonies from other veterans that they had crossed into Laos throughout a 16-month period extending through all of 1971, well past the enactment of the Cooper–Church Amendment forbidding such actions and which had come into effect in January 1971. On March 27, 1974, Senator Harold Hughes informed the Senate that several witnesses had testified to the Senate Armed Services Committee about U.S. combat forces entering Laos and Cambodia after they were forbidden to do so. Department of Defense white papers revealed thirteen platoon-sized operations in Laos between January 1971 and April 1972.

== Winter Soldier results ==
Immediately following the WSI, Senator George McGovern and Representative John Conyers announced that they were calling for congressional investigations based on the testimony. This announcement was received with skepticism by the veterans, but VVAW representatives agreed to meet with McGovern and Conyers.

=== Senator Hatfield's address to Congress ===
On Monday, April 5, 1971, Senator Mark Hatfield of Oregon addressed the WSI allegation made in Detroit that war crimes were the result of military policy and racism was widespread in the armed forces. Hatfield noted that some of these allegations, specifically of war crimes, would place the United States in violation of the Geneva Convention and international laws of war.

Hatfield made several recommendations. He asked that a transcript of the Winter Soldier Investigation be read into the Congressional record and made available to the public. Hatfield also asked congress to hold hearings discussing the use of military force in Vietnam and their relation to international agreements ratified by the United States legislature. He sent the testimony to the Department of Defense, the Department of State asked Marine Commandant, Leonard F. Chapman, Jr., to investigate the allegations. He recommended consideration be given to forming a special commission that would look into these issues and provide a forum to determine the moral consequences of American involvement in Vietnam.

On April 22, 1971, John Kerry testified before the Senate Foreign Relations Committee during their hearings on the Vietnam war, and made reference to evidence brought forth by veterans at the WSI. He covered some of the actions of Americans in Vietnam, saying "We rationalized destroying villages in order to save them...We learned the meaning of free fire zones, shooting anything that moves, and we watched while America placed a cheapness on the lives of Orientals. We watched the U.S. falsification of body counts, in fact the glorification of body counts...We fought using weapons against those people which I do not believe this country would dream of using were we fighting in the European theater or let us say a non-third-world people theater, and so we watched while men charged up hills because a general said that hill has to be taken, and after losing one platoon or two platoons they marched away to leave the high for the reoccupation by the North Vietnamese because we watched pride allow the most unimportant of battles to be blown into extravaganzas, because we couldn't lose, and we couldn't retreat, and because it didn't matter how many American bodies were lost to prove that point."

=== Media coverage ===
Mainstream media all but ignored the Winter Soldier Investigation. The East Coast papers refused to cover the hearings, other than a New York Times story a week later. The local field reporter for the Times, Jerry M. Flint, commented with uninterest, "this stuff happens in all wars." In a February 7, 1971 article he wrote that "much of what they said had been reported or televised before, even from Vietnam. What was different here was the number of veterans present." Several of the VVAW representatives speculated that there was an "official censorship blackout," and they would express this theory later in their newsletter.

A few articles that were sympathetic to the veterans appeared in lesser-known publications, and Pacifica Radio, known for its left-wing perspective, gave the event considerable coverage. The CBS television crew that showed up were impressed, but only three minutes made it to the nightly news on the first night—three minutes that were "mostly irrelevant to the subject", according to VVAW.

The Detroit Free Press printed several stories about the event, including comments from the military. This included confirmation by the Pentagon that WSI participants investigated by reporters were indeed Vietnam veterans. The Pentagon's denials of large scale U.S. activity in Laos was reported as well, until reporters learned from several marines not involved with WSI that operations in Laos had been conducted.

The words of the participants have been permanently recorded in the Congressional Record. Portions of the testimony, as well as some photos of the event, appear in a book produced by the Vietnam Veterans Against the War and John Kerry entitled The New Soldier.

In addition, film footage of the event, as well as some pre-event and post-event footage, and commentary can be found in Winter Soldier: A film / Winterfilm Collective in association with Vietnam Veterans Against the War. Winterfilm, Inc., 1972.

- Film version: 1972, B&W, 16 mm, 93 min.
- Videotape: 1992, B&W with some color, 110 or 130 minutes
- The Winterfilm Collective consisted of: Fred Aranow, Nancy Baker, Joe Bangert, Rhetta Barron, Robert Fiore, David Gillis, David Grubin, Jeff Holstein, Barbara Jarvis, Al Kaupas, Barbara Kopple, Mark Lenix, Michael Lesser, Nancy Miller, Lee Osborne, Lucy Massie Phenix, Roger Phenix, Benay Rubenstein, Michael Weil.

A documentary film of the event, titled Winter Soldier, was first released in February 1972 at the Cinema 2 theater in the Whitney Museum in Manhattan, New York. In May 1972 it was reviewed at the Berlin and Cannes Film Festivals. Due to the disturbing nature of the subject matter about an ongoing war, it got little distribution and support at that time and had been archived by its creators, collectively called the Winterfilm Collective.

In September 2005, it was re-released across the U.S. in small art house theatres. Most of the media reviews have regarded the film positively, with some calling it a "powerful" and "emotional" record of the era. The same year, a website was established to spread information about this documentary and to spread information about further showings of the film (in the United States).

Despite significant fund raising efforts by supporters of the VVAW, the cost of the Winter Soldier Investigation event financially bankrupted the organization. Organizers of the event hoped to recoup some of their expenditures through the above-mentioned book, film and recording deals. Orders were taken at the event for copies of the film footage, which was to be made available for $300.

== Winter Soldier: Iraq & Afghanistan ==
Winter Soldier: Iraq & Afghanistan was an event organized in March 2008 by Iraq Veterans Against the War, inspired by the Vietnam-era Winter Soldier Investigation, at which U.S. veterans provided accounts of their experiences in Iraq and Afghanistan.

== See also ==
- Rape during the Vietnam War
- Going Upriver – Documentary recounting John Kerry's participation in the Vietnam war and subsequent antiwar movement.
- GI Coffeehouses
- GI Underground Press
- Soldiers in Revolt: GI Resistance During the Vietnam War, book about soldier & sailor resistance during the Vietnam War
- Vietnam War Crimes Working Group – Documentary evidence compiled by a Pentagon task force detailing war crimes committed by US troops.
- Detroit Committee to End the War in Vietnam
- Vietnam Veterans Against the War
