= Ed Murphy (activist) =

American peace and labor activist (born 1945)

Ed Murphy (born August 6, 1945) is an American peace and labor activist, the founding and retired executive director of the Workforce Development Institute. He was a former military intelligence soldier who exposed the CIA's Phoenix Program in April 1970.

== Early life ==
Murphy attended a public grammar school and graduated from St. Peter's Boys High School, run by the Christian Brothers. When he discerned a vocation to the priesthood, he chose the Paulist Fathers in Baltimore.

He spent his third year in seminary in silence and meditation as a Paulist novitiate without academic classes, radio, TV or newspapers. In July 1966 he left the seminary without being ordained, returning to secular life.

He surrendered his draft deferment and enlisted in the military, to work in Military Intelligence. In January 1967 he attended Basic Training at Fort Gordon, Georgia and then returned to Baltimore for the US Army Intelligence School at Fort Holabird; followed by eight months studying Vietnamese, at the Defense Language Institute, Biggs Field, El Paso, Texas.

== Career ==
Murphy served in Vietnam from May 1968 to May 1969 as a sergeant in the 4th Military Intelligence Detachment, 4th Infantry Division in Pleiku, where his first recorded statement against the war was made.

Murphy returned to the U.S. and was assigned to the 116th Military Intelligence Detachment in Washington D.C., conducting background checks for those applying for security clearances. He completed his military duty on January 15, 1970. The next day he met with Sam Brown, organizer of the Vietnam Moratorium and immediately spoke out against the Vietnam war and use of the military to spy on domestic activities. In January 1970, Murphy returned to Staten Island and became an early organizer of VVAW, Vietnam Veterans Against the War. In May 1970, he appeared at the Overseas Press Club with Michael Uhl and the Citizens Commission of Inquiry to expose the Phoenix Program.

In 1977, Murphy wrote a history of conservationists' efforts to protect the mineral springs in Saratoga Springs, New York and the founding of the Saratoga Spa State Park, This document, The Politics of Hydrotherapy and The Development of a New York State Policy (December 14, 1977) is part of the local history collection in the Saratoga Room at the Saratoga Springs Public Library. Mario Cuomo, then-Governor of New York, appointed Murphy Deputy Director, NYS Division of Veterans Affairs.

In 1991, Murphy left New York to work on reconciliation with Vietnam, do business and environmental consulting and provide humanitarian assistance. He participated in the United Nations' Industrial Development Organization (UNIDO)'s 1991 Investors Forum in Ho Chi Minh City and subsequent meetings with government leaders in Hanoi. For a decade Murphy worked with government, businesses, organized labor, NGOs and educational institutions interested in establishing programs in Southeast Asia. Through his alma mater, the College of Staten Island (CSI), he lectured, initiated programs related to and assisted in development of the City University of New York's establishment of English language training in and educational exchanges with Vietnam. He brought his daughter Zoeann with him on a CSI trip to Indochina, after which they wrote their book Vietnam: Our Father Daughter Journey

In 1999, Murphy began to work with the NYS AFL-CIO, and helped establish the Workforce Development Institute (WDI), as a national leader in workforce intelligence, education and training of unionized workers. In addition to serving as the executive director of WDI, he is co-founder of the Apollo Alliance.
