= Field of fire =

Area that can be reached by a weapon

The field of fire or zone of fire (ZF) of a weapon, or group of weapons, is the area around it that can easily and effectively be reached by projectiles from a given position.

== Field of fire ==
The term originally came from the field of fire in front of forts (and similar defensive positions), cleared so there was no shelter for an approaching enemy.

== Sector of fire ==
A similar term sector of fire is used to describe the area into which each gunner or group are allowed to fire. The boundaries are assigned by the commanding officer and thus can be arbitrary, even three-dimensional (a rifleman attacking a building might be assigned a set of windows to target).

== Arc of fire ==
The arc of fire of a mounted gun is a horizontal ("traverse") angle range within which the gun (or guns) can be fired. It can be limited by the construction of the gun mount or obstacles (for example, superstructure of a ship). If there are no restrictions, the term all-round arc of fire is sometimes used. Overlapping arcs of fire create a crossfire.

== Cone of fire ==
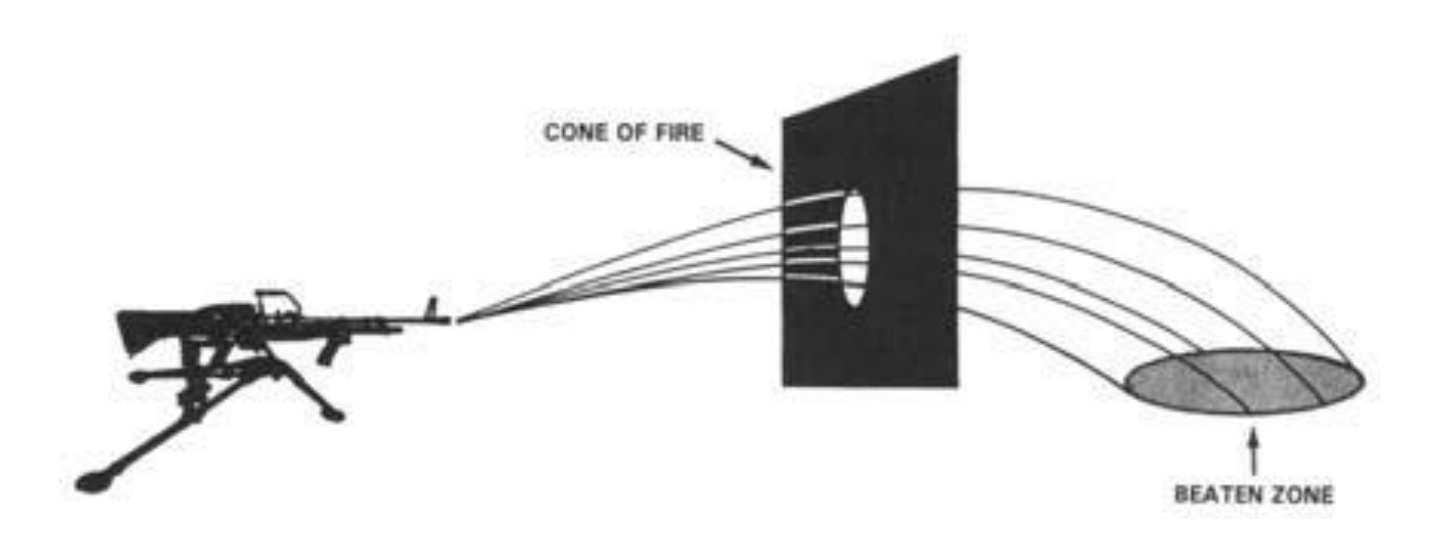
Cone of fire and beaten zone of a machine gun

The cone of fire describes a cone-like pattern formed by the projectiles with the gun not being moved. It is mostly used in reference to machine guns. The spread of rounds is due to vibration of the gun, tolerances of the ammunition and weapon, and the gunner's posture. For a typical machine gun, the spread between bullets is proportional to the distance (for example, the width of the cone for M240G is 2/1000 of the distance). The cone of fire makes impact in an elliptical pattern called the beaten zone.

== Danger space ==
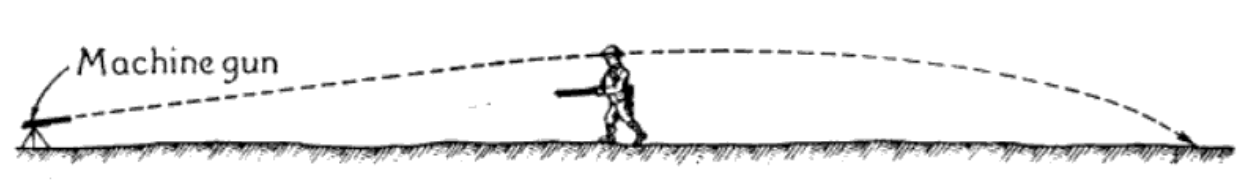
Danger space of the machine gun fire

When firing over terrain, any space up to 1.8 m above the ground (the height of an average man) is considered danger space; that is, within the effects of the rounds. For small arms fire, when the distance to the beaten zone is up to approximately 700 m, on a flat terrain the danger zone is contiguous (the trajectory of the round is never above the height of a man). The area that cannot be seen or aimed at within the gun's range (usually due to the terrain) is referred to as dead space. It is sometimes possible to send projectiles into the dead space using the indirect fire.

== See also ==
- Kill box

== Sources ==
- Bond, P.S.; Garey, E.B.; Ellis, O.O.; McMurray, T.L.; Crouch, E.H. (1922). Field Engineering: A Practical Exposition of the Organization of the Ground for Defense as Developed by the U. S. Army in the World War. New military library. New military library.
- DOD Dictionary of Military and Associated Terms (PDF). Department of Defense. 2017.
- Heal, S. (2005). An Illustrated Guide to Tactical Diagramming: How to Determine Floor Plans from Outside Architectural Features. Lantern Books. ISBN 978-1-59056-096-9.
- McLean, R.; Van der Veer, N.R. (1918). The Bluejackets' Manual: United States Navy, 1918. Military Publishing Company.
- United States. Joint Chiefs of Staff (1987). "field of fire". Department of Defense Dictionary of Military and Associated Terms. JCS pub. Joint Chiefs of Staff.
- USMC. B3N4478 Machine Gun Employment (PDF). US Marine Corps.
