= Samuel Proctor Oral History Program =

Program at the University of Florida, US

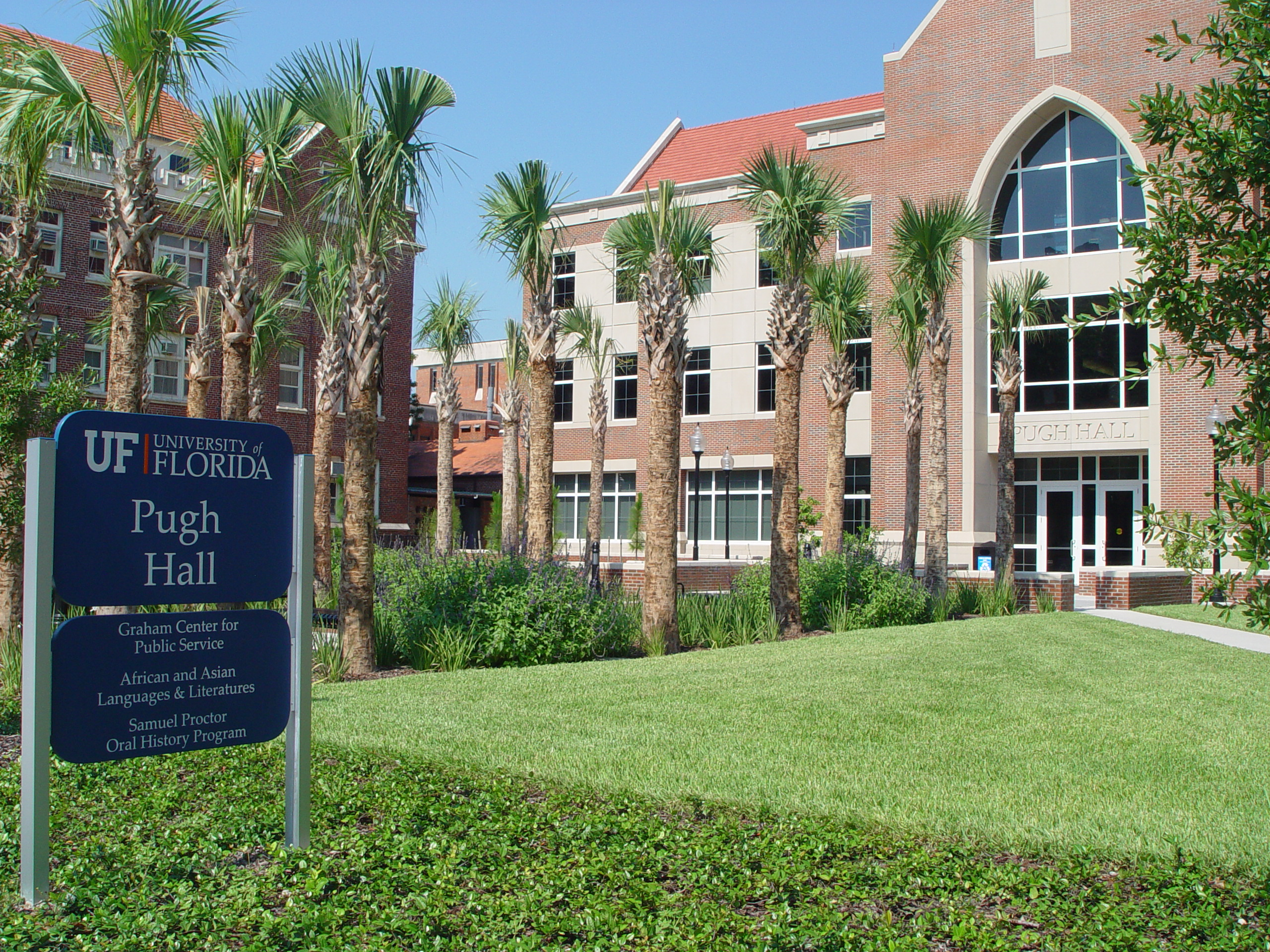
- Former name: University of Florida Oral History Program
- Motto: One community, many voices
- Type: Oral history program
- Established: 1967
- Parent institution: University of Florida
- Director: Dr. Jamin Wells
- Location: Gainesville, Florida, United States
- Nickname: SPOHP
- Website: oral.history.ufl.edu

The Samuel Proctor Oral History Program (SPOHP) is the official oral history program at the University of Florida. With more than 10,000 interviews and sound recordings and more than 150,000 pages of transcribed material, it is one of the largest university based oral history programs in the United States. SPOHP's mission is "to gather, preserve, and promote living histories of individuals from all walks of life." The program's activities involve staff, undergraduate and graduate students, and community volunteers.

== History ==
The program was founded by Dr. Samuel Proctor in 1967 as the University of Florida Oral History Program. Its original projects were collections centered around Florida history with the purpose of preserving eyewitness accounts of economic, social, political, religious and intellectual life in Florida and the South. Major projects focused on Native American, African American, military, and Florida county-specific history. Much of SPOHP's early work was initiated by grants and support from the Doris Duke Foundation.

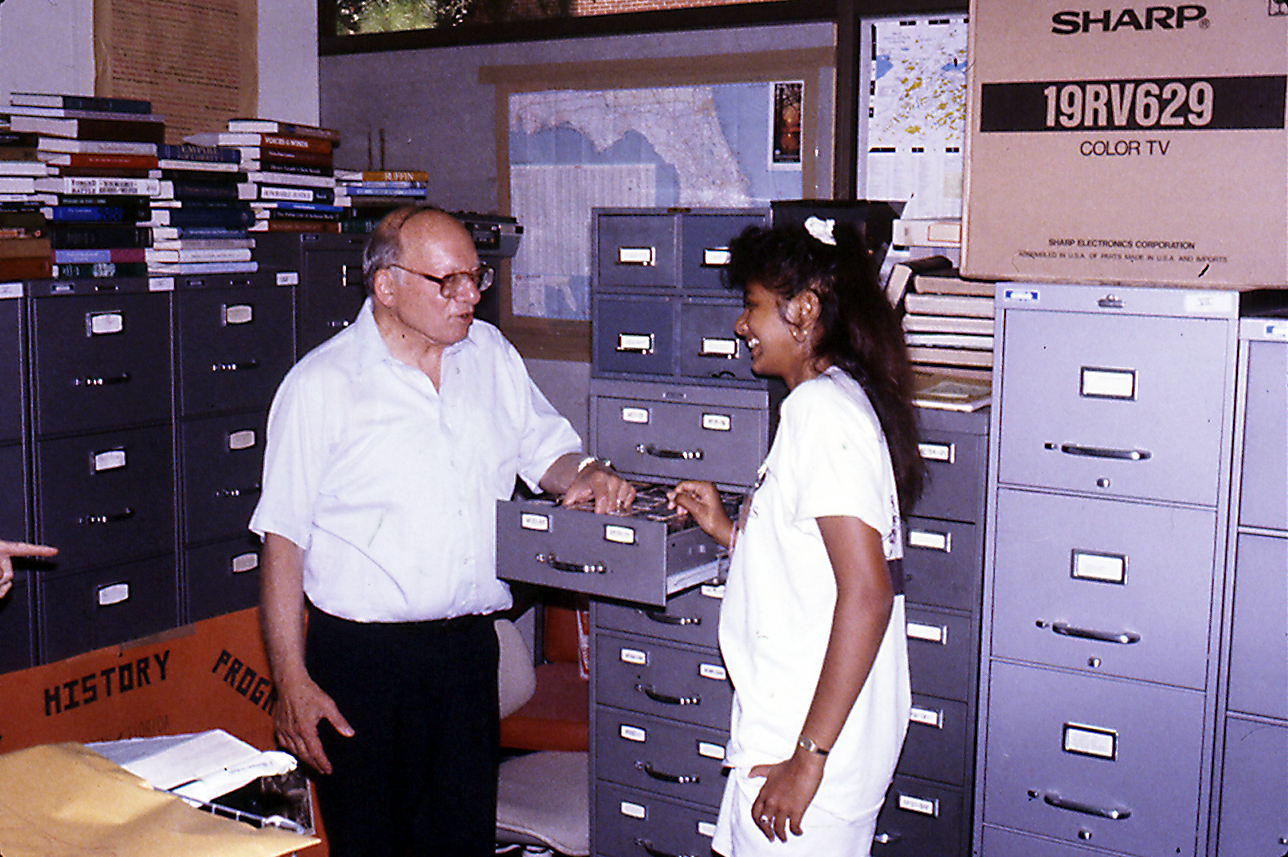
Dr. Samuel Proctor, with a student at the University of Florida Oral History Program in 1980.

Dr. Samuel Proctor, the UF Oral History Program's original founder, was a prominent scholar of Florida history and a pioneer in the field of oral history in the United States. Dr. Proctor taught in the History Department at the University of Florida for fifty years, serving as the first official University of Florida Historian and Archivist and holding chairs as Distinguished Service Professor of History and Julian C. Yonge Professor of History. He was also the Director of the Center for Florida Studies and the History Curator at the Florida Museum of Natural History.

Following Dr. Proctor's tenure, the directorship of the program was taken up by Dr. Julian Pleasants, who renamed the program in Proctor's honor and lead the program from 1996 to 2008. Dr. Paul Ortiz served as director of SPOHP from 2008 to 2023. During this period, the program's holdings increased from approximately 4,000 interviews to more than 8,500, alongside work involving civil rights, African American, environmental, Native American, and veteran's histories. Dr. Jamin Wells became the program's fourth permanent director in 2025.

=== Awards ===
In October 2013, the Samuel Proctor Oral History Program was recognized by the Oral History Association with the Stetson Kennedy Vox Populi ("Voice of the People") award for outstanding achievement in using oral history to create a more humane and just world.

In April 2014, UF's Institute of Hispanic-Latino Cultures awarded SPOHP "Best Cultural Event" at the annual Noche de Gala ceremony for the production of the documentary, "Siempre Adelante: A Look at Faith and the Immigrant Struggle."

In August 2015, the Society of American Archivists recognized the Samuel Proctor Oral History Program and its Latina/o Diaspora in the Americas Project with the 2015 Diversity Award, for demonstrating significant achievement in archival activism, education, outreach, and service, based on long-term impacts improving and promoting diversity.

== Field Research, Public Programs, and Education Initiatives ==
The Samuel Proctor Oral History Program strives to promote the thousands of oral narratives entrusted in its care, making existing and emerging collections accessible to a wide audience by uploading transcripts of interviews, maintaining digital archives, creating educational podcasts, and organizing public programs and events. SPOHP also produces a newsletter, featuring new research and student work, that is published each semester.

SPOHP promotes the craft and intellectual traditions of oral history through university seminars, classes, and community-based workshops. SPOHP offers an internship class for 12-16 undergraduate students each semester, involving training in oral history practices and fieldwork experience, and also operates a program for volunteers on a rotating semester basis. The program consults on an ongoing basis with local historians, civic leaders, and educators across the country interested in initiating oral history projects in their towns and municipalities.

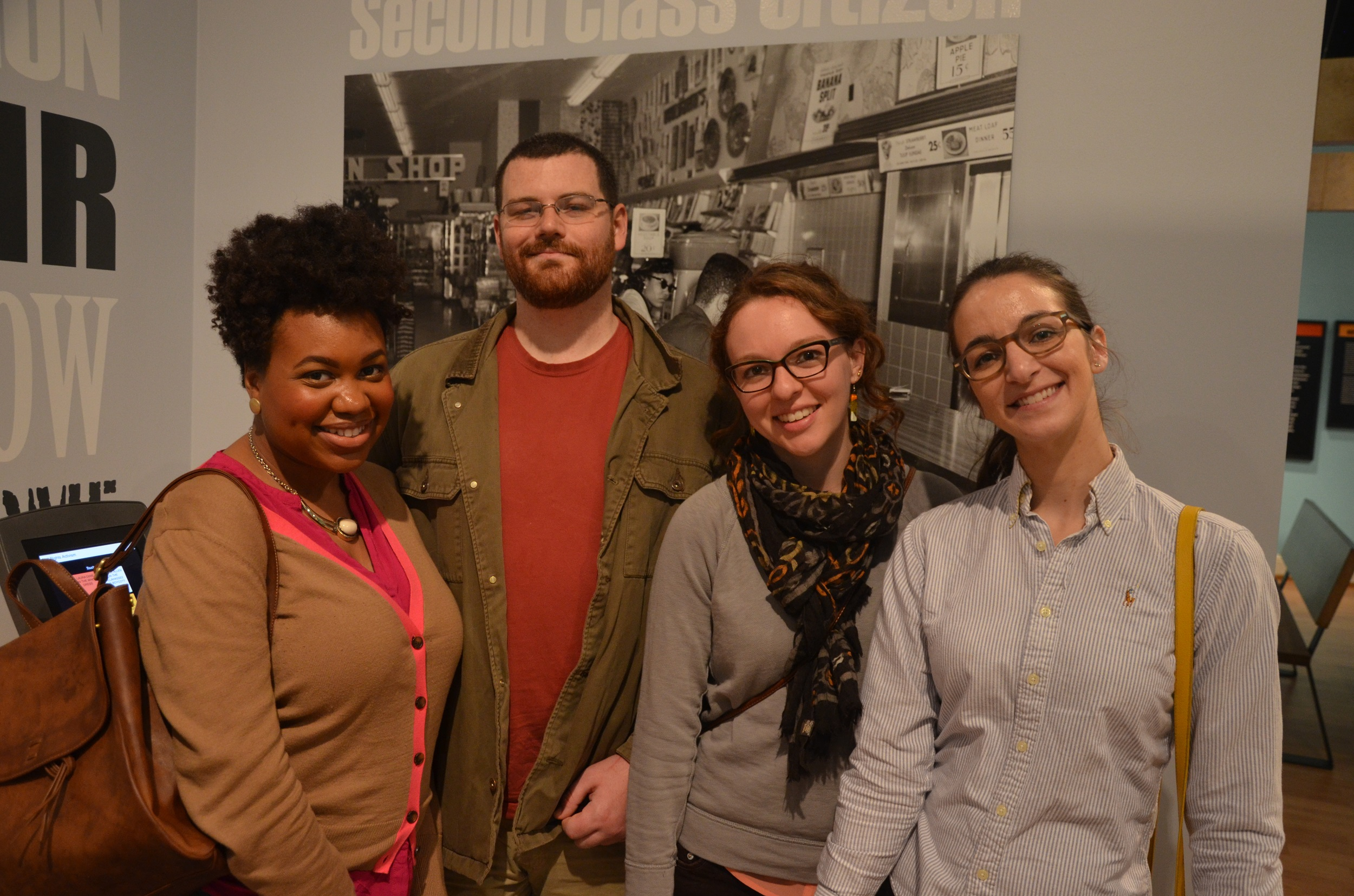
SPOHP staff and AAHP coordinators at the "Civil Rights in the Sunshine State" Exhibit.

In November 2014, the Museum of Florida History in Tallahassee, Florida opened its first-ever civil rights exhibit, "Civil Rights in the Sunshine State," taking a frank look at African American history from the 19th through the 21st centuries. SPOHP's African American History Project contributed oral history recordings and related materials to the exhibit, and Dr. Ortíz played a role in two successive civil rights panels hosted by the museum during Black History Month in February 2015.

As of Spring 2015, over 60 original SPOHP podcasts are available to a global audience through the University of Florida Digital Collections and iTunes. These podcasts are created by staff, undergraduate and graduate students, and community volunteers with the intention of making oral histories shareable in an easy-to-access format. Most podcasts are under 15 minutes or less to facilitate easy access to local history for students, teachers, and the general public.

In 2026, the program is undertaking a project to digitize recordings from its archive. The initiative was supported by a $75,000 grant from the University of Florida Office of Provost, secured by former interim director Matt Jacobs and distributed over the course of three years. The project involves converting older recordings into digital formats and preparing them for public access through the university's library collections.

=== BA/MA 4+1 Combined Degree Program ===
The University of Florida Department of History announced a combined Bachelor's and Master's Degree Program in oral history. The program, open to students studying any field of modern history, emphasizes public history and the use of oral histories to connect academic research with local communities. Students receive training in oral history methods and prepare a final portfolio instead of a traditional thesis. This portfolio includes an audio or video project based on recorded interviews, along with interview transcripts, an annotated bibliography, and a paper examining the historical context of the project.

=== Events and Public Programs ===
In the 2012–2013 school year, SPOHP hosted a variety of public events, including "Inside the Activists Studio: A Sit-in with Margaret Block," "Near Andersonville: Winslow Homer's Civil War" with Dr. Peter Wood, "Rebels and Runaways: Slave Resistance in 19th Century Florida" with Dr. Larry Rivers, "The Wonder of Their Voices: The 1946 Holocaust Interviews of Dr. David Boder" with Dr. Alan Rosen, "The Feminine Mystique at 50/Madmen, Working Girls, and Desperate Housewives: Men, Women, and Marriage in 1963 and 2013" with Stephanie Coontz.

In Fall 2013, SPOHP premiered the original documentary "Siempre Adelante: A Look at Faith and the Immigrant Struggle" on October 1, produced using interviews from the immigrant communities of Alachua County and Gainesville. It is SPOHP's third full-length documentary, featuring narratives of four immigrants from Mexico, El Salvador, and Guatemala who share the struggle of living undocumented in Alachua County, and have been supported by their faith in the face of fear and discrimination in the United States. In connection with UF Libraries' Department of Special & Area Studies Collections, SPOHP celebrated the donation of Stetson Kennedy's personal papers to the University of Florida on October 22. The all-day event concluded with an evening panel in Pugh Hall featuring FIU professor Marvin Dunn, folklorist Peggy Bulger, and sociologist Lucy Anne Hurston, niece of Zora Neale Hurston, in a discussion of Kennedy's legacy moderated by Ben Brotemarkle, with an introduction from UF First Lady Chris Machen.

In Spring 2014, SPOHP hosted three public programs. On January 15, 2014, renowned documentary filmmaker Tia Lessin screened award-winning film, "Trouble the Water" and hosted a symposium event. Through "Trouble the Water," New Orleans residents Kimberly Rivers Roberts and her husband Scott documented the destruction caused by Hurricane Katrina with their own original footage, as well as their struggle to recover in the following months. On March 12, 2014, SPOHP hosted a presentation by Vietnam veteran and political activist Scott Camil, who discussed his involvement in the Gainesville Eight trials and the donation of personal papers and documents related to the event to SPOHP and UF. Also on March 12, SPOHP organized a panel discussion with civil rights veterans to honor the 50th anniversary of the modern civil right movement in Florida. Students read excerpts from SPOHP's African American History Project (AAHP), providing the audience with more stories of others involved in the movement.

The National Endowment for the Humanities and American Library Association sponsor the 'Latino Americans: 500 Years of History' grant.

For the 2015–16 academic year, SPOHP planned a series of public programs and events focused on Latino history in Florida, funded by the National Endowment for the Humanities and American Library Association's "Latino Americans: 500 Years of History" $10,000 grant. Sarah McNamara, a SPOHP alumna and then PhD candidate in history at the University of North Carolina at Chapel Hill, coordinated the programming in connection with SPOHP's Latina/o Diaspora in the Americas Project.

=== Fieldwork Research Trips ===
During the Fall 2014 semester, SPOHP took a hiatus from planning public programs to plan publications and research trips, including the Virginia Fieldwork in Folklore trip in October 2014, organized by graduate coordinator Jessica Taylor. Taylor organized the trip to bring student interns and staff to work as field researchers in eastern Virginia, recording interviews related to folklore, traditional crafts, and rural development with residents of Mathews and Middlesex Counties. The trip featured two oral history open houses in Virginia, a methods workshop, and an interdisciplinary panel open to the public with folklorists, historians and archaeologists from the Virginia Folklife Program, College of William & Mary, and Fairfield Foundation. Virginia Folklife Program, Also during the fall semester, staff and students attended the 48th annual Oral History Association meeting in Madison, Wisconsin.

During the Spring 2015 semester, SPOHP continued field research trips, including the Appalachian Social Change Project in February 2015, organized by graduate coordinator Jessica Taylor. Taylor worked with Dr. Scott Huffard of Lees-McRae College to bring student interns and staff to work as field researchers in the Appalachian region of North Carolina, recording interviews about rural development, folk culture, and tourism.

Additionally, Latina/o Diaspora in the Americas coordinator Génesis Lara organized the 11-day Documenting the Ethnic Studies Struggle Through Oral History fieldwork trip, taking place over spring break in collaboration with Prescott College. The trip was organized to bring student researchers to Tucson, Arizona to focus on discovering the importance of ethnic studies education in the United States. Working in collaboration with students and faculty from Prescott College, UC-Santa Barbara, and the University of New Mexico, and educators from the Tucson community, researchers were expected to conduct oral history interviews and participate in workshops and panels. The trip sought to place University of Florida students and the Tucson community in conversation regarding their educational experiences and what role ethnic studies plays in students’ academic experiences.

=== Mississippi Freedom Project ===
SPOHP's annual research trip to the Mississippi Delta builds its Mississippi Freedom Project collection, which focuses on civil rights history in the state of Mississippi, and serves to place undergraduate and graduate researchers in a dynamic environment to gather hands-on experience and knowledge of progressive social movements. SPOHP has partnered with the Sunflower County Civil Rights Organization, a non-profit organization consisting of Sunflower County Civil Rights veterans, as well as the Sunflower County Freedom Project, McComb Legacies Project, and Teaching for Change. The sixth annual research trip, in September 2013, was featured on the social justice network Groundswell.org.

In Summer 2013, UF's George A. Smathers Libraries approved a mini-grant proposal to transcribe the SPOHP's Mississippi Freedom Project collection. The completion of this project was timed to coincide with the 50th anniversary of Freedom Summer during the summer of 2014, when SPOHP presented the completed transcripts to veterans of the Mississippi Freedom Summer at their 50th anniversary reunion. This processing project leveraged existing knowledge, resources, and partnerships to promote online access to the Mississippi Freedom Project collection, including the development of a Freedom Summer LibGuide, two new podcasts, and a second phase which involves continuing transcription, Google Optimization of transcripts, and expanded Mississippi Freedom Project content on SPOHP's website.

The latest MFP research trip, the eighth in the collection's history, took place June 15–20, 2015, and included interviews in Natchez, Mississippi and in Montgomery, Alabama with the Southern Poverty Law Center and Equal Justice Initiative. Oral history interviews for the Mississippi Freedom Project are now available online at the University of Florida Digital Collections website.

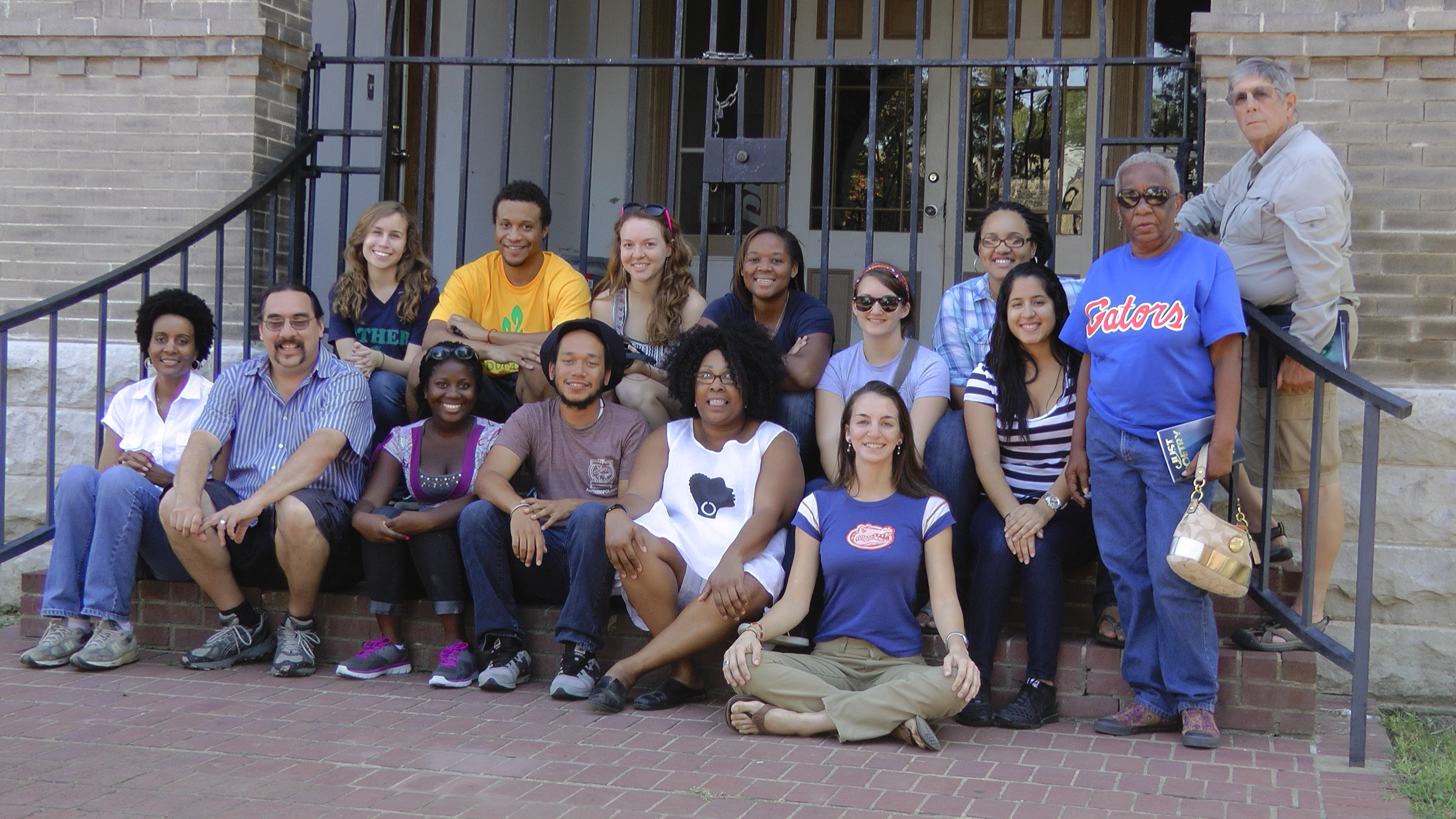
The Samuel Proctor Oral History Program launched its fifth annual Mississippi Freedom Project Research Trip in 2012. Group pictured here at the Tallahatchie County Courthouse.

== Collections ==
SPOHP is continuously engaged in active research projects designed to broaden the scope and scale of its collections, using contributions from undergraduate and graduate students as well as trained volunteers. SPOHP's collections contain more than 10,000 interviews and sound recordings on a wide range of topics. A portion of the program's interviews have been transcribed and made available through the University of Florida Digital Collections.

A 2022 study by the University of Florida's George A. Smathers Libraries examined ways to improve access to SPOHP's digital collections. The project involved reviewing more than 4,600 records and correcting inconsistent or outdated terms used to describe the materials. These changes helped make related interviews and other historical materials easier to find through the University of Florida Digital Collections.

=== Veterans History Project ===
In 2000, SPOHP was approached by the Library of Congress to assist in efforts with collecting oral history interviews of World War II veterans. Since that time, SPOHP has been conducting interviews for the Library's Veterans History Project, which is a project of its American Folklife Center. Ann Smith, a longtime SPOHP volunteer, is the project director. SPOHP has submitted over 100 interviews to date.

=== Gainesville Business History Project ===
In 2018, the Inquire Capitalism program was founded with funding from the Hyatt and Cici Brown Chair of History. It is currently headed by Sean Adams. With the help of SPOHP, the Gainesville Business History project has highlighted local businesses in the Gainesville area through a collection of oral histories. The oral history interviews are available through the University of Florida Digital Collections and the SPOHP YouTube channel.

=== African American History Project ===
SPOHP's African American History Project (AAHP) was developed to document local African American history, with particular attention to segregation under Jim Crow, racial integration, and the civil rights movement. In January 2010, the University of Florida announced a $150,000 grant to support the project. Originally conceived as the Alachua County African American History Project, AAHP quickly expanded into other parts of North and Central Florida, and now contains over 300 interviews with elders, leaders, activists, and other community members. Themes in the collection include pre-integration black high schools and their contemporary legacies and significance; previously silenced narratives of racially motivated violence and repression; the quotidian socio-economics of providing for families and maintaining communities under Jim Crow; and the conflicted history of the University of Florida's interactions with and influence on local African American communities.

The African American History Project started taking shape in early 2009 through discussions that involved SPOHP director Paul Ortiz, Gainesville civil rights activist and University of Florida librarian Joel Buchanan, and university administrators. Buchanan helped organize meetings focused on developing an oral history initiative centered on local African American experiences. Other early contributions included UF doctoral student Marna Weston, who became the project's first graduate research coordinator. On March 17, 2009, the AAHP held a public launch event called "Florida Black History: Where We Stand in the Age of Barack Obama" at Smathers Libraries East. The event featured student performances and a panel discussion moderated by Buchanan, with participants addressing racial inequality at the university and in the larger community.

Interviews from the collection were used in the UF School of Theatre and Dance's original presentation, "Gator Tales," in February 2015. The original play, edited and directed by Kevin Marshall, used oral histories from the African American History Project to share the unique experiences of the first African American students at the University of Florida, "bring[ing] vividly to life the voices of those who first struggled for civil rights and the generations that followed." "Gator Tales" ran at UF February 13–22, 2015, in Edinburgh, Scotland at the Festival Fringe in Summer 2015, and at the Oral History Association annual meeting in Tampa, Florida on October 15, 2015.

=== Latina/o Oral History Projects ===
The Latina/o Diaspora in the Americas Project was established in fall 2014 under the guidance of Paul Ortiz and Génesis Lara. The initiative focused on collecting and preserving the histories of Latina/o communities, particularly their political experiences and historical perspectives. It also led to the creation of a University of Florida course examining these subjects through oral history research.

SPOHP has also collaborated with the University of Florida's Department of Spanish and Portuguese Studies on student oral history projects. In fall 2015, students in the Spanish in the Community course created Raíces en movimiento | Roots in Motion, featuring interviews with second and third generation Hispanic residents of Gainesville about language, cultural identity, and community life. Developed in collaboration with SPOHP and Deborah Hendrix, the project marked the thirteenth consecutive year of the partnership.

=== Native American Oral History Collection ===
The SPOHP's Native American oral history collection originated from a 1966 project funded by philanthropist Doris Duke, in order to record the experiences of Indigenous communities throughout North America. The collection consists of more than 1,000 historical materials dating primarily from the late 1960s and 1970s, representing six Indigenous communities in the southeastern United States. In partnership with the University of Florida's George A. Smathers Libraries, SPOHP later participated in a preservation initiative supported by the Doris Duke Foundation. Following a 2020 review that aimed at identifying problems with the collection's organization, documentation, and physical preservation, the initiative worked to digitize recordings, improve the transcripts, and update archival records. The project also involved consulting with the Indigenous communities represented in the collection to ensure and determine how their recorded histories could be preserved and accessed. Some communities agreed to make the materials publicly available, while others requested restricted access or chose not to distribute certain recordings online.

SPOHP regularly develops documentaries, podcasts, and other audio selections to highlight interviews in its collections. SPOHP's archives also contains a variety of different sound files, including University of Florida speeches, videotapes of television interviews, Native American slides and photos, and recordings of music.

Featured projects include:

- African American History Project (AAHP)
- Coalition of Immokalee Workers
- Community Organizing in America
- Confederate Veterans
- Cold War History
- Disability History
- Duval County
- Everglades
- Everglades Jetport
- Fifth Avenue Blacks
- Florida Business Leaders
- Florida Environment and Ecology
- Florida Elections Project
- Florida Opportunity Scholars
- Florida Politics
- Florida Ranching
- Florida Water Management
- Haitian Revolution Memories
- Immigration History in America
- Iraq Veterans
- Korean War
- Lumbee Indians
- Mississippi Choctaw
- Mississippi Freedom Project
- 9/11 Project
- Nantucket Preservation
- Ocklawaha River Project
- Panama Canal Museum Project
- Returned Peace Corps Volunteers
- St. Augustine Civil Rights
- St. Augustine Historic Preservation
- Student Action with Farmworkers
- Suwannee River
- Tucson Ethnic Studies
- University of Florida
- UF College of Nursing
- UF Healthcare Center
- UF College of Law
- United Faculty of Florida
- Veterans History Project
- Vietnam War Veterans
- Women Activists Feminists
- Women's Police
- World War II Veterans

Featured interviewees:

- Shelby Foote
- A. Quinn Jones
- Stetson Kennedy
- Archie Carr
- Andrew Mickle
- Wilhelmina Johnson
- Farris Bryant
- LeRoy Collins
- Bob Graham
- Alan Bean
- Margaret Block
- Lawrence Guyot
- Bernie Machen
- Sadie Darnell
- Walter L. "Red" Barber
- Dr. Robert Cade
- General William Westmoreland
- Dave Barry
- William Dub Warrior
- Medea Benjamin
- Scott Camil
- David Barsamian

== See also ==
- Oral history
- Samuel Proctor
- University of Florida
- College of Liberal Arts and Sciences
- University of Florida Digital Collections
- Oral History Association
