= Michael Uhl =

Michael Uhl (born 1944) is a Vietnam veteran, antiwar activist, critic and academic.

== Early life and education ==
Uhl was born in 1944 and grew up in Babylon, Long Island, New York. He graduated with a BS in Theoretical linguistics from the Faculty of Languages and Linguistics, Georgetown University. He holds an interdisciplinary Ph.D. in American Studies and Writing (Creative Non-fiction) from the Union Institute and University.

== Career ==
In the Army, Uhl served in Vietnam during 1968-69 as a first lieutenant, where he led a combat intelligence team with the 11th Infantry Brigade. After Vietnam, Uhl entered a doctoral program in linguistics at New York University, and became immediately involved in the antiwar movement, joining the New York City based Citizens Commission of Inquiry on U.S. War Crimes in Vietnam (CCI) as a full-time organizer. (Note: The work of the CCI, with which Uhl served as a principal, is the subject of Standard Operating Procedure: Notes of A Draft-age American, by James Simon Kunen.) He helped organize the National Veterans Inquiry and the Winter Soldier Investigation. In 1970, Uhl joined Ed Murphy in exposing the Phoenix Program, testified at the International Enquiry on US War Crimes in Stockholm, Sweden, and in 1971, he was called to testify before a US Congressional subcommittee investigating the CIA's Phoenix Program in Vietnam. He co-authored the first book-length treatment on the health effects of chemical herbicides (Agent Orange) on U.S. veterans of the Vietnam War.

== Publications ==
He has authored or edited numerous works within the Antiwar movement, including:

- —, ed. (1972). Dellums Committee Hearings on War Crimes in Vietnam. New York: Vintage Books. ISBN 978-0394717678.
- Ensign, Tod; Uhl, Michael (1980). GI Guinea Pigs: How the Pentagon Exposed Our Troops to Dangers More Deadly Than War: Agent Orange and Atomic Radiation. Chicago, Illinois: Playboy Press. ISBN 978-0872235694.
- — (2007). Vietnam Awakening: My Journey From Combat to the Citizens' Commission of Inquiry on U.S. War Crimes in Vietnam. Jefferson, North Carolina: McFarland & Company. ISBN 978-0-7864-3074-1.
- — (2016). "The War I Survived Was Vietnam". McFarland Books.

Uhl also authored multiple travel guides, including four for Frommer's Guides.

== Film ==
With Richard Schmiechen, Uhl wrote and co-produced the short documentary film, Nick Mazucco: Biography of an Atomic Vet, on a grant from the Public Broadcasting Corporation.
