= Fulbright hearings =

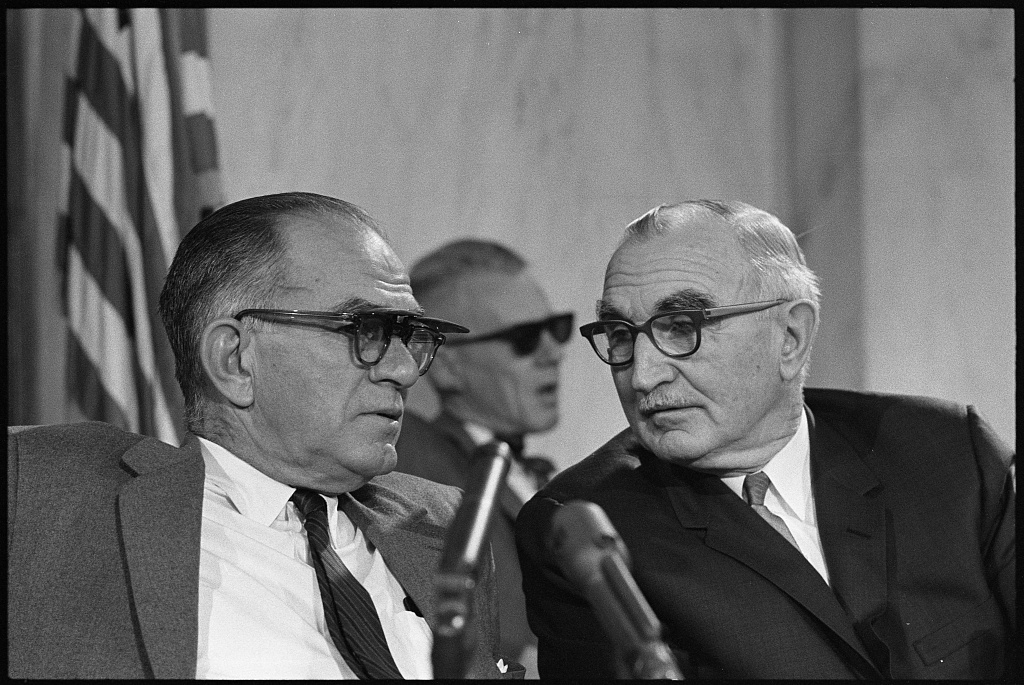
Senator J. William Fulbright (left) with Senator Wayne Morse during a hearing in 1966

The Fulbright Hearings refers to any of the set of U.S. Senate Foreign Relations Committee hearings on Vietnam conducted between 1966 and 1971. This article concerns those held by the U.S. Senate in 1971 relating to the Vietnam War. By April 1971, with at least seven pending legislative proposals concerning the war, the Senate Foreign Relations Committee, chaired by Democratic Senator J. William Fulbright of Arkansas began to hear testimony. The 22 hearings, titled "Legislative Proposals Relating to the War in Southeast Asia", were held on eleven different days between April 20, 1971, and May 27, 1971. The hearings included testimony and debate from several members of Congress, as well as from representatives of interested pro-war and anti-war organizations.

== Committee members ==
- Jacob K. Javits (Republican — New York)
- Clifford P. Case (Republican — New Jersey)
- George D. Aiken (Republican — Vermont)
- Karl E. Mundt (Republican — South Dakota)
- John Sherman Cooper (Republican — Kentucky)
- Hugh Scott (Republican — Pennsylvania)
- James B. Pearson (Republican — Kansas)
- J. William Fulbright (Democrat — Arkansas)
- Claiborne Pell (Democrat — Rhode Island)
- Stuart Symington (Democrat — Missouri)
- John Sparkman (Democrat — Alabama)
- Mike Mansfield (Democrat — Montana)
- Frank Church (Democrat — Idaho)
- Gale W. McGee (Democrat — Wyoming)
- Edmund S. Muskie (Democrat — Maine)
- William B. Spong, Jr. (Democrat — Virginia)

== Proposals under consideration ==
S. 376 — The Vietnam Disengagement Act, to amend the Foreign Assistance Act of 1961 to provide that after May 1, 1971, authorized or appropriated funds may be used in connection with activities of American Armed Forces in and over Vietnam only: to accomplish orderly termination of military operations and the safe withdrawal of remaining American Armed Forces by December 31, 1971; to assure the release of prisoners of war (POWs) and the safety of South Vietnamese who might be physically endangered by American withdrawal; and to provide assistance to South Vietnam consistent with these objectives.

S. 974 — To amend the Foreign Assistance Act of 1961 to prohibit any involvement of U.S. Armed Forces in an invasion of North Vietnam without prior and explicit congressional authorization.

S.J. Res. 82 — Proposing that the U.S. agree to complete withdrawal of all U.S. military personnel from South Vietnam within twelve months following completion of the exchange, under appropriate international supervision, of all POWs.

S. Con. Res. 17 — Reaffirming U.S. neutrality in the 1971 South Vietnamese elections, calling upon the President to implement a policy of strict neutrality, and creating a bi-partisan congressional commission, supported by a staff in Vietnam throughout the election campaign, to oversee U.S. policies and activities that might interfere with the electoral process.

S. Res. 62 — Resolving that the Senate Committee on Foreign Relations, Appropriations, and Armed Services should examine and report on the requirements and consequences of the orderly withdrawal of all U.S. forces from Southeast (SE) Asia including the safe return of American POWs.

S. Res. 66 — Urging the President immediately to withdraw all U.S. Armed Forces from Indochina and to terminate all military operations in Indochina except those of a purely defensive character related to the withdrawal, conditioned only upon agreement with the Government of the People's Republic of Vietnam for the release and repatriation of U.S. POWs.

S.J. Res. 89 — Resolving that upon agreement between the U.S. and North Vietnamese Governments as to the release of American POWs, the U.S. shall declare a ceasefire in-place and withdrawal all its military forces and equipment from South Vietnam not later than nine months from the date of the agreement.

== The hearings ==
Chairman Fulbright opened the hearings with a brief statement summarizing their purpose:

"Under our system Congress, and especially the Senate, shares responsibility with the President for making our Nation's foreign policy. This war, however, started and continues as a Presidential war in which the Congress, since the fraudulent Gulf of Tonkin episode, has not played a significant role. [...] The purpose of these hearings is to develop the best advice and greater public understanding of the policy alternatives available and positive congressional action to end American participation in the war."

Fulbright commented that Congress' predicament had a precedent in the frustration experienced by the French National Assembly during the First Indochina War. That war ended only after the National Assembly responded to growing public concern and brought in a new government pledged to negotiate a settlement in Geneva within a month, resulting in the Geneva accords that ended that war.

=== Testimony 1 ===
April 20, 1971. Testimony given by Senators George McGovern (D-South Dakota) and Mark O. Hatfield (R-Oregon) on the desirability of Senate Resolution 376; differences in intention and likely consequences of Administration policy and S. 376, including constitutionality of the two approaches; relative merits of proposal by Sen. John Sherman Cooper (R-Ky) to make a firm commitment of withdrawal but without setting a definite date.

=== Testimony 2 ===
April 20, 1971. Testimony given by Sen. Vance Hartke (D-Ind.) on the need for Senate Resolution 66; summary of conversations with each of the four delegations to the Paris peace talks; and the necessity of a fixed date for U.S. military withdrawal from Vietnam.

=== Testimony 3 ===
April 21, 1971. Testimony given by Senator Jacob K. Javits on the weakening effect of Vietnam war on U.S.; desirability of June 30, 1972, terminal date for U.S. military force withdrawal from Vietnam.

=== Testimony 4 ===
April 21, 1971. Testimony by Senator Jack Miller (R-Iowa) on the need for feasibility of S.J. Resolution 82; reliability of North Vietnamese statements regarding return of POWs.

=== Testimony 5 ===
April 21, 1971. Testimony by Senator Adlai Stevenson (D-Ill) on support for announced date of withdrawal of all American forces; desirability and practicability of S. Con. Res. 17 as means of encouraging political settlement in Vietnam.

=== Testimony 6 ===
April 21, 1971. Testimony by Senator Walter Mondale on support for S. 376; summary of and need for S. 974, including feasibility of adding an amendment to an appropriation bill to achieve purpose.

=== Testimony 7 ===
April 21, 1971. Testimony by Senator William B. Saxbe (R-Ohio) on the questionable value of S. 376 as long as accelerated withdrawal continues.

=== Testimony 8 ===
April 22, 1971. Testimony by John Kerry (Representative of Vietnam Veterans Against the War [VVAW]) on the necessity of immediate and unilateral withdrawal based on Vietnam veterans' personal experiences. Discussion then followed on means of disengagement from war and how to achieve political settlement in Indochina, as well as discourse on the viability of the American political system. Kerry was the only representative of Vietnam Veterans Against the War who testified on April 22, but others in VVAW were in the audience and at times supported his remarks with applause. Kerry gave a prepared open statement and was then questioned by the senators.

During this testimony Kerry asked his often-quoted question, "How do you ask a man to be the last man to die in Vietnam? How do you ask a man to be the last man to die for a mistake?"

During the 2004 United States presidential campaign, as Kerry was running for President, some critics focused media attention on his participation in the hearings and alleged that parts of his testimony portrayed American war veterans of that era in an unduly harsh light. Other critics went farther and claimed that Kerry's testimony about US atrocities emboldened the North Vietnamese to torment the Americans POWs who were still imprisoned at the time.

==== Opening statements ====
Senator Fulbright's opening statement was appreciative of Kerry's views, and also mentioned a recent U.S. Supreme Court decision, subsequently reversed, which ruled that Vietnam Veterans Against the War, the group for which Kerry was a leader and spokesman, did not have a constitutional right to use the National Mall.

==== Kerry's testimony ====
After a brief supportive statement from Senator Javits, Kerry read his prepared opening statement, and stated:

"I would like to say for the record, and also for the men behind me who are also wearing the uniforms and their medals, that my sitting here is really symbolic. I am not here as John Kerry. I am here as one member of the group of veterans in this country, and were it possible for all of them to sit at this table they would be here and have the same kind of testimony."

"The men behind me" refers to members of VVAW and others who came to the committee to hear Kerry testify, which by all accounts was very crowded with supporters and media.

Kerry then explained the Winter Soldier Investigation, which took place earlier that year in Detroit, Michigan. This part of the testimony is considered controversial:

"...I would like to talk, representing all those veterans, and say that several months ago in Detroit, we had an investigation at which over 150 honorably discharged and many very highly decorated veterans testified to war crimes committed in Southeast Asia, not isolated incidents but crimes committed on a day-to-day basis with the full awareness of officers at all levels of command.

"It is impossible to describe to you exactly what did happen in Detroit, the emotions in the room, the feelings of the men who were reliving their experiences in Vietnam, but they did. They relived the absolute horror of what this country, in a sense, made them do.

"They told the stories at times they had personally raped, cut off ears, cut off heads, tape wires from portable telephones to human genitals and turned up the power, cut off limbs, blown up bodies, randomly shot at civilians, razed villages in fashion reminiscent of Genghis Khan, shot cattle and dogs for fun, poisoned food stocks, and generally ravaged the country side of South Vietnam in addition to the normal ravage of war, and the normal and very particular ravaging which is done by the applied bombing power of this country."

After defining "Winter Soldiers" as a play on words from Thomas Paine, Kerry summarized the reason he and his supporting veterans were speaking out:

"We who have come here to Washington have come here because we feel we have to be winter soldiers now. We could come back to this country; we could be quiet; we could hold our silence; we could not tell what went on in Vietnam, but we feel because of what threatens this country, the fact that the crimes threaten it, not reds, and not redcoats but the crimes which we are committing that threaten it, that we have to speak out."

Kerry described the anger and betrayal felt by Vietnam War veterans, then moved on to political issues:

"In our opinion, and from our experience, there is nothing in South Vietnam, nothing which could happen that realistically threatens the United States of America. And to attempt to justify the loss of one American life in Vietnam, Cambodia or Laos by linking such loss to the preservation of freedom, which those misfits supposedly abuse, is to use the height of criminal hypocrisy, and it is that kind of hypocrisy which we feel has torn this country apart."

Kerry expressed his belief that nothing in Vietnam threatened the United States, and that the war was merely a Vietnamese civil war instead of part of a global struggle against Communism. He added:

"We found also that all too often American men were dying in those rice paddies for want of support from their allies. We saw firsthand how money from American taxes was used for a corrupt dictatorial regime. We saw that many people in this country had a one-sided idea of who was kept free by our flag, as blacks provided the highest percentage of casualties. We saw Vietnam ravaged equally by American bombs as well as by search and destroy missions, as well as by Vietcong terrorism, and yet we listened while this country tried to blame all of the havoc on the Vietcong."

=== Testimony 9 ===
April 28, 1971. Testimony given by Jay Craven, Susan Gregory, John Scagliotti, Chip Marshall and Kathy Sister (all representatives of Students and Youth for a People's Peace) on the devastation of war in Indochina; genesis of People's Peace Treaty; charged fallacy of President's policy and failure of Congress and democratic system; necessity of new tactics to end the war. Discussion and debate followed regarding the intent, tactics and effects of planned civil disobedience; South and North Vietnamese treatment of POWs and likelihood of mutual exchange without conditions.

=== Testimony 10 ===
April 28, 1971. Testimony by Melville L. Stephens (former Navy Lt.) on the weaknesses of arguments for setting definite withdrawal date; U.S. responsibility to South Vietnamese people. Discussion followed regarding commitment to Vietnamese versus domestic commitment.

=== Testimony 11 ===
May 3, 1971. Testimony by Secretary of State John N. Irwin and Deputy Assistant Secretary for East Asian and Pacific affairs William H. Sullivan on the review of Administration policy on ending U.S. participation in Vietnam war and repatriation of American POWs; opposition of announcement to fixed date for total withdrawal. Discussion followed on the rationale for continuation of war, including Constitutional authority for President's Vietnam policy; extent of Administration and State Department responsiveness to committee views and requests and to public opinion; U.S. activity in Laos and Cambodia during and after withdrawal of American forces in Vietnam. Also presented and inserted for the record, "President Nixon's Record on Vietnam, 1954-68," chronology of actions and statements as reported in the New York Times.

=== Testimony 12 ===
May 11, 1971. Testimony by Senator Thomas F. Eagleton on the probability and implications of continuing involvement in Vietnam if definite withdrawal date not set; support for S. 376.

=== Testimony 13 ===
May 11, 1971. Testimony by John W. Gardner (Chairman of Common Cause, Washington, D.C.) on the swing in public opinion regarding Vietnam war; support for announced withdrawal date and schedule whereby prisoner releases would be phased with stages of withdrawal; need for reassertion of congressional power and influence vis-a-vis the Executive Branch.

=== Testimony 14 ===
May 12, 1971. Testimony by Edward Gelsthorpe (President of Hunt-Wesson Foods, Inc.) on the destructive effects of Vietnam war on domestic and international situations; need for an announced date for complete U.S. military withdrawal.

=== Testimony 15 ===
May 13, 1971. Testimony by Gerald C. Hickey (Social Sciences Dept., Rand Corporation.), Robert Shaplen (Far Eastern Correspondent, New Yorker Magazine) and Don Luce (former freelance journalist in Vietnam) on U.S. withdrawal policy as it relates to possibilities of a political settlement in Vietnam; value and supervision of South Vietnamese elections; current situation in SE Asia as a whole and probable immediate and long range consequences of various policy alternatives.

=== Testimony 16 ===
May 25, 1971. Testimony by David M. Shoup (Retired General, Marine Corps) on desirability of speedy withdrawal of U.S. forces; need for continuing U.S. military aid following troop withdrawal.

=== Testimony 17 ===
May 25, 1971. Testimony by W. Averell Harriman (Washington, D.C.) on the desirability of Congressional use of power of the purse to force Administration to negotiate withdrawal and thereby to compel South Vietnamese to negotiate a political settlement; support for congressional mission to observe South Vietnamese elections.

=== Testimony 18 ===
May 26, 1971. Testimony by Charles W. Yost (former U.S. Permanent Representative to the United Nations), Richard A. Falk (professor of International Law and Practice, Princeton University) and John W. Lewis (professor, Institute of Political Studies, Stanford University) on the desirability of setting firm withdrawal date; policy in SE Asia following withdrawal, including need for Geneva-type conference; moral aspects of the Vietnam war including debate on the extent to which U.S. war policies may have constituted war crimes; China's changing role in Indochina; necessity and means of persuading President of present opportunities to end Vietnam war.

=== Testimony 19 ===
May 27, 1971. Testimony by Representative Andrew Jacobs, Jr. (D-Ind) on the desirability of House Resolution 319, calling for withdrawal of all U.S. forces from Vietnam sixty days after North Vietnamese agree to return all U.S. prisoners in Indochina; lack of influence on policy of changed public opinion regarding Vietnam war.

=== Testimony 20 ===
May 27, 1971. Testimony by Representative Paul N. McCloskey (R-Calif) on alleged deceptive briefings regarding relocation and bombing of Laotian and Vietnamese villages and the Phoenix Program; support for S. 376; congressional power over appropriations as means to force Executive Branch cooperation.

=== Testimony 21 ===
May 27, 1971. Testimony by Herbert R. Rainwater (Commander in Chief, Veterans of Foreign Wars) on opposition to proposals for immediate, unilateral or unconditional withdrawal of U.S. forces from SE Asia; South Vietnamese economic and political progress during war; extent of reliability of North Vietnamese assurances regarding release of U.S. POWs. Also presented and inserted for the record: Problems faced by Vietnam war veterans, compendium of newspaper and magazine articles.

=== Testimony 22 ===
May 27, 1971. Brief testimony by former U.S. Senator Joseph S. Clark (D-PA) (President, World Federalists, USA), Senator Alan Cranston (D-Calif) and Ernest Gruening (former Senator from Alaska, D) on support for S. 376.

== See also ==
- Going Upriver
- Stolen Honor

== Sources ==
- Legislative Proposals Relating to the War in Southeast Asia, Hearings before the Committee on Foreign Relations, United States Senate, Ninety-Second Congress, First Session (April–May 1971), Washington: Government Printing Office, 1971.
- Day 3 Hearing transcript (Wikisource).
- Full text of 3rd day of hearings (From C-SPAN's website; transcript originally by the Government Printing Office).
- Partial audio of the 3rd day of hearings
- Brinkley, Douglas. Tour of Duty: John Kerry and the Vietnam War. Harper Collins: 2004. 1, 3-18, 267, 367, 270-72, 365, 378, 379, 400, 401, 420, 432, 433, 437.
- Kerry, John & Vietnam Veterans Against the War (1971). The New Soldier. CA: Simon & Schuster. ISBN 0-02-073610-X
