= Winterfilm Collective =

The Winterfilm Collective (listed as Winterfilm, Inc. in the credits to the film Winter Soldier) consisted of Fred Aronow (cinematographer), Nancy Baker (editor), Joe Bangert (member of Vietnam Veterans Against the War), Rhetta Barron (editor), Robert Fiore (cinematographer), David Gillis (cinematographer), David Grubin, Jeff Holstein (cinematographer), Barbara Jarvis (editor), Algis "Al" Kaupas (sound mixer), Barbara Kopple, Mark Lenix (another VVAW member), Michael Lesser (cinematographer), Nancy Miller (sound mixer), Lee Osborne (sound mixer), Lucy Massie Phenix (editor), Roger Phenix (sound mixer), Benay Rubenstein (editor), Rusty Sachs (VVAW member), and Michael Weill (editor).

The collective produced and directed the 1972 documentary Winter Soldier about the 1971 Winter Soldier Hearings in Detroit as well as the Vietnam Veterans Against the War (VVAW) anti-war protest and march in Washington, DC, where VVAW members denounced the Vietnam War and threw their medals away.

The collective also helped fund the restoration of Shirley Clarke's documentary Portrait of Jason.
