= Scott Camil =

United States Marine

- Born: May 19, 1946 (age 80); Brooklyn, New York
- Military career
- Allegiance: United States of America
- Branch: United States Marine Corps
- Service years: 1965 to 1967
- Rank: Sergeant
- Conflicts: Vietnam War
- Awards: Purple Heart (×2); Combat Action Ribbon; Presidential Unit Citation (×2); Marine Good Conduct Medal; National Defense Service Medal; Vietnam Service Medal-three stars Vietnamese Cross of Gallantry w/Silver Star; Vietnamese Cross of Gallantry w/ Palm Leaf

Scott Camil (born May 19, 1946) is an American political activist. He first gained prominence as an opponent of the Vietnam War, as a witness in the Winter Soldier Investigation and a member of Vietnam Veterans Against the War.

== Early life and education ==
Camil was born in Brooklyn, New York, to Jewish parents with origins in Romania and Russia. His parents were divorced when he was four years old. His mother remarried and he, his mother, stepfather and sister moved to Florida, where two stepbrothers were born. Camil had a troubled childhood, frequently being beaten by his authoritarian stepfather and occasionally getting into fights with school children who would harass him because he was Jewish. He was brought up to believe he lived in the best country in the world and that, as a citizen, he had a duty as a male to go into the military to serve his country after high school. He enrolled in the Marines delayed enlistment program while still in high school and entered boot camp at Marine Corps Recruit Depot Parris Island three days after graduating.

He served with the Marines from 1965 to 1969, earning two Purple Hearts, Combat Action Ribbon, two Presidential Unit Citations, Good Conduct Medal, National Defense Service Medal, Vietnam Service Medal with three stars, Vietnam Cross of Gallantry with Silver Star, Vietnam Cross of Gallantry with Palm Leaf and Vietnam Campaign Medal during two tours in Vietnam. With Charlie Company, 1st Battalion, 1st Marines, 1st Marine Division, he acted as a forward observer for artillery. He was a sergeant when honorably discharged.

After his discharge from military service, Camil enrolled with Miami-Dade Community College on the G.I. Bill and later transferred to the University of Florida. In a 2005 interview with UF's Samuel Proctor Oral History Program, he recounted that as a student he went to see Jane Fonda speak "to see what a movie star looked like." Fonda spoke on the importance of an informed public in a democracy, and said, as paraphrased by Camil, "that it was the duty of every patriotic Vietnam veteran to make the truth known to the public." Camil agreed with that. He also felt that his sacrifices as a soldier had gone unrecognized in contrast to those of soldiers in past wars, saying, "I got two Purple Hearts, I was wounded, I killed lots of people [and] where was my thanks?"

He soon learned about the Winter Soldier Investigation and became active in the Vietnam Veterans Against the War, later becoming a chapter leader. He graduated from UF while on trial as one of the "Gainesville Eight."

== Vietnam war activism ==
Recognized by the FBI as an "extremist and key activist," Camil was on President Nixon's "enemies list." On December 22, 1971, FBI Director J. Edgar Hoover sent a classified memo to the Jacksonville office regarding Camil, referring to him as an "extremely dangerous and unstable individual whose activities must be neutralized at earliest possible time." Other memos about Camil used the same word, neutralize, less ambiguously, "Jacksonville continue to press vigorously to insure (sic) that all necessary action taken to completely neutralize subject without delay." Camil explained, "When you pin the government down, they'll say, "Well, 'neutralize' just means to render useless. But if you talk to guys in the field, they say it means to kill." Camil was shot by federal agents on March 31, 1975, in a drug sting and nearly died.

=== Winter Soldier Investigation ===
Camil became the Florida Coordinator for the VVAW and was one of the most outspoken participants of the 1971 Winter Soldier Investigation in which returning personnel recounted the atrocities they had been induced into committing against combatants and non-combatants alike. Camil (also referred to as "Camile" in the transcripts) testified of:

burning of villages with civilians in them, the cutting off of ears, cutting off of heads, torturing of prisoners, calling in of artillery on villages for games, corpsmen killing wounded prisoners, napalm dropped on villages, women being raped, women and children being massacred, CS gas used on people, animals slaughtered, Chieu Hoi passes rejected and the people holding them shot, bodies shoved out of helicopters, tear-gassing people for fun and running civilian vehicles off the road.

=== Medals returned ===
At Senator Hart's garden party during Dewey Canyon III, Camil wore two Purple Heart medals, a Vietnamese Cross for Gallantry with Silver Star and a Good Conduct medal. He called the medals a farce that he would return on Friday. In the documentary "A Seasoned Veteran," Camil stated: "The throwing away of the medals, for me, was the cutting of the umbilical cord between me and the government. I was now independent."

=== Taking it to the source ===
In a 1992 interview, Camil revealed for the first time that he had considered shooting "the most hardcore hawks" in Congress as an alternative to returning medals during the Dewey Canyon III demonstration in April 1971. In Camil's words, "I didn't think it was terrible at the time ... I was serious. I felt that I spent two years killing women and children in their own fucking homes. These are the guys that fucking made the policy, and these were the guys that were responsible for it, and these were the guys that were voting to continue the fucking war when the public was against it. I felt that if we really believed in what we were doing, and if we were willing to put our lives on the line for the country over there, we should be willing to put our lives on the line for the country over here." Six months later at a November 1971 meeting, after recruiting participants and describing his weapons training range, Camil proposed to the VVAW his idea about the assassination of the members of Congress who showed the most support for the war. The proposal was voted down.

=== University of Florida activism ===
At the 1971 UF homecoming parade, Quakers, Unitarian Church members and VVAW members, including Camil, created a spectacle. Dressed as rifle-carrying soldiers, some of them carried a coffin draped in an American flag and carried a sign that read "The Impossible Dream - No More War." People panicked after smoke bombs were ignited and VVAW members pretended to stab civilians (VVAW actors) in the crowd who had packets of fake blood hidden beneath their clothing. They then passed out leaflets to the crowd informing them that if they lived in Vietnam, this could really be happening to them, their friends, their family and their children. It was during this period that the Orange County (FL) Young Democrats chose Scott Camil as their "Person of the Year," causing a rift between the Young Democrats and the more conservative Orange County Democratic Committee.

=== Gainesville Eight ===
Camil explained in an interview that the group received information that during the 1972 Republican National Convention the government was going to shoot someone and blame it on the anti-war protesters. They were also going to raise the five drawbridges so that antiwar demonstrators would be trapped on Miami Beach and shot by police and soldiers. In response, Camil's group planned to draw those police and soldiers away by attacking federal buildings, police stations and fire stations in the two adjacent counties to occupy the government forces, then reopen bridges to aid escape of the demonstrators. These plans were typed up and distributed among the rest of the group by a member who was also an FBI informant. The eight members of Camil's group were charged with conspiracy to disrupt the Republican National Convention.

The jury got to read the letter containing all the plans for attacking the federal buildings, but they also got to read the constantly repeated admonition, "This will be done for defensive purposes only." The jury determined that their goal was to protect the rights of the protesters, and they found the eight men not guilty. In Camil's words, "We had no conspiracy to disrupt the convention. Our conspiracy, if you want to call it that, was to go down to the convention and exercise our Constitutional rights as citizens and to defend those rights against anybody who tried to take away those rights, whether it be the government or anyone else. And the jury sided with us."

The jury acquitted all eight after a long trial in 1973, taking only a few minutes to do so.

== Ongoing activism ==
- In 1987, represented the Veterans for Peace organization on a fact-finding trip to Central America.
- In 1989, represented the Veterans for Peace organization on a fact-finding trip to the Middle East.
- In 1990, observed elections in Nicaragua.
- In 1994, went to Vietnam for the Vietnam Friendship Village Project.
- He supported John Kerry for U.S. president in 2004 and objects to the Iraq War.
- GI Rights Hotline Counselor.
- In 1987, Present, President of Gainesville Veterans for Peace Chapter 14.
- In 2002, Suwannee St Johns Group Sierra Club Executive Committee.
- In 2010, Elected Political Chair, Suwannee St Johns Group Sierra Club.
- In 2010, Steering Committee, United Voices for Peace.
- In 2014, Founder and Steering Committee member, StandByOurPlan.org.
- In 2017, Outstanding Citizen, League of Women Voters, Alachua County.
- In 2020, Alachua County, Charter Review Commission, Member. https://www.alachuacounty.us/CharterReview/Pages/default.aspx

== Personal life ==
As of 2015, Camil lives in Gainesville, Florida with his wife Sherry, is active in local politics, and is writing an autobiography. He is the subject of the 2002 documentary film, "Seasoned Veteran: Journey of a Winter Soldier", by Benito Aragon, Melinda Kahl and Michael Kirschbaum.

== Miscellany ==
Graham Nash wrote and recorded the song "Oh Camil! (The Winter Soldier)" in tribute to Scott Camil after hearing his testimony in the documentary "Winter Soldier". The song appears on Nash's 1973 album Wild Tales. The song is also on the DVD Winter Soldier.
