= Mississippi Freedom Project (oral history project) =

The Mississippi Freedom Project (MFP) is an archive of oral histories collected by the Samuel Proctor Oral History Program at the University of Florida. The ongoing project contains 100+ interviews online and focuses on interviews with civil rights veterans and notable residents of the Mississippi Delta. The collection centers on activism and organizing in partnership with the Sunflower County Civil Rights Organization in Sunflower, Mississippi.

== Project history and annual research trip ==
SPOHP director Paul Ortiz began conducting oral history field work in the Mississippi Delta in 1995 as a graduate research coordinator of the National Endowment for the Humanities-sponsored "Behind the Veil: Documenting African American Life in the Jim Crow South" project at the Center for Documentary Studies, and maintained a relationship with the Sunflower County Civil Rights Organization, a local civil rights veteran group. Since 2008, the Samuel Proctor Oral History Program has traveled to the Delta on annual research trips with undergraduate students, graduate students, and program staff for the Mississippi Freedom Project to collect oral histories of the local movement. In 2014, SPOHP returned to the Delta on its annual trip for 50th anniversary celebrations honoring movement veterans of Freedom Summer from June 23–29.

During the trip, the Mississippi Freedom Project conducts oral history interviews in partnership with the Sunflower County Civil Rights Organization, and frequently works with research allies including the McComb Legacies Project, Friends of Justice, Fannie Lou Hamer Civil Rights Museum in Belzoni, MS, the United Food and Commercial Workers Union in Belzoni, Museum of African American History in Natchez, MS, Emmett Till Historic Intrepid Center, Sunflower County Freedom Project, and Civic Media Center, as well as George A. Smathers Libraries at the University of Florida.

The Mississippi Freedom Project research team is guided in their research by lifelong civil rights activist Margaret Block, who grew up in Bolivar County and worked with SNCC throughout the Delta with leaders including Stokely Carmichael, Amzie Moore, Fannie Lou Hamer, Bob Moses, Hollis Watkins, and her brother, Sam Block, during voter registration drives and citizenship school initiatives. Block is the main leader and instructor for SPOHP's MFP tour of the Delta, frequently speaking at panel events and leading driving tours of historical sites that are significant to the movement and Mississippi history, including Mound Bayou, Dockery Plantation, Indianola, MS, Ruleville, MS, sites surrounding Emmett Till's murder in Tallahatchie County, and others, including Winterville Mounds.

The next research trip will take place June 15–20, 2015.

== Collections ==
The Mississippi Freedom Project oral history collections focus on history of the civil rights movement in the Mississippi Delta from veteran activists and notable residents. In Summer 2013, UF's George A. Smathers Libraries approved a mini-grant proposal to transcribe the SPOHP's Mississippi Freedom Project collection. The grant improved online access to the Mississippi Freedom Project collection, sponsoring the processing of over 50 interviews, creation of educational podcasts, and development of expanded online media content. Over 70 interviews are now available as of July 2014, timed to coincide with Freedom Summer anniversaries. "I Never Will Forget", an edited volume of 60 oral history interviews with civil rights veterans in Sunflower County, was published in June 2014 for the Freedom Summer reunion. Major topics include:

- Civil rights movement
- Jim Crow laws
- Citizens' Councils
- Segregation
- Integration
- Sharecropping
- Student Nonviolent Coordinating Committee (SNCC)
- Women in SNCC, with interviews from Peggy Klekotka
- Congress of Racial Equality (CORE)
- Southern Christian Leadership Conference (SCLC)
- Council of Federated Organizations (COFO)
- COINTELPRO (Counter Intelligence Program)
- Black Panther Party
- Labor union organizing
- Selma to Montgomery Rights March
- United Food and Commercial Workers International Union
- History of Sunflower County, MS, Bolivar County, MS, McComb, MS, Jones County, MS, and more.

The Mississippi Freedom Project archives include over 135 interviews, 76 are available online as of July 2014:

- Liz Fusco Aaronsohn
- James Abbott
- Reverend Dr. Alan Bean and Nancy Bean
- Margaret Block
- Nathaniel Boclair, Jr.
- Earnest Brown
- Otis Brown
- Bertha Burres
- Florine Carter
- Gelda Chandler
- Thelma Collins
- Allen Cooper
- Gloria Dickerson
- Darron L. Edwards
- Tanya Evans
- Charles Featherstone
- Delta State Equal Rights Panel (2009)
- Emma Golden
- Heather Hudson
- Tommy Farmer
- Dennis Flannigan
- Lawrence Guyot, Jr.
- Anita and Arrack Jefferson
- Everlyn Johnson
- Hattie Jordan
- Margaret Kibbee
- Foster King
- Karen Jo Koonan
- Lilly Lavallais
- Tommie Novick Lunsford
- McKinley Mack
- Atavis Minton
- Greg McCoy
- Charles Modley
- Justine Moser
- Benjamin Nance
- Rosa Parks (with UF Libraries' James S. Haskins Collection) concerning the Montgomery Bus Boycott of 1955 and other events leading up to Freedom Summer
- Sheriel Perkins
- Elmo Proctor
- David Rushing
- Charles Scott
- Isaac Shorter
- Helen Sims
- Valerie Simpson
- Willie Spurlock
- Eddie Steel
- Jerry Tecklin
- Ryan Thomas
- Carver Randle
- Akinyele Umoja
- Hollis Watkins
- Dorsey White
- Stacey White
- Jakylla Williams
- Kelvin Williams
- Bright Winn

== See also ==
- Oral history
- Mississippi Freedom Summer
- Samuel Proctor Oral History Program
- University of Florida
- College of Liberal Arts and Sciences
- George A. Smathers Libraries
- University of Florida Digital Collections
