= Samuel Proctor =

American historian

- Born: March 29, 1919; Jacksonville, Florida
- Died: July 10, 2005 (aged 86); Gainesville, Florida
- Education: B.A., University of Florida, 1937; M.A., University of Florida, 1942; Ph.D., University of Florida, 1958

Samuel Proctor (March 29, 1919 – July 10, 2005) was an American history professor and author. He taught at the University of Florida (UF) and wrote about the school and the state's history.

== Early life and education ==
Proctor was born in Jacksonville, Florida. He was one of six sons of Jack Proctor, a textile salesman who was born in Poland, and Celia Proctor (née Schneider), a housewife. Proctor arrived at the University of Florida as a freshman in 1937 and received his Bachelor of Arts in 1941. As an undergraduate, he was on the staff of the Florida Alligator. He received his Master of Arts from UF in 1942 after only two semesters, in which the wrote a 560-page thesis, Napoleon Bonaparte Broward: The Portrait of a Progressive Democrat, on Florida Governor Napoleon Bonaparte Broward. In 1950 Proctor published Napoleon Bonaparte Broward: Florida's Fighting Democrat with the University Press of Florida.

Proctor served in the United States Army during World War II, where he taught reading and arithmetic to illiterate Army recruits at Camp Blanding near Starke.

== Career at the University of Florida ==
Discharged from the service in 1946, he was offered scholarships to pursue an international law degree at Yale and Ohio State. However, he instead decided to return to the University of Florida, originally to attend the College of Law. One of his former professors, William Carleton (chairman of the freshman social sciences program and later namesake of Carleton Hall) convinced him to help alleviate the post-war shortage of teachers.

In 1953, University President J. Hillis Miller, Sr. named Proctor the first UF Historian and Archivist and commissioned him to write a book on UF history in honor of the university's 100th anniversary. The resulting work was submitted by Proctor as his dissertation, The University of Florida: its early years 1853-1906, and he received his Ph.D. in 1958. Proctor remained the UF Historian and Archivist until his death, serving even in retirement. He published a history of the university, Gator History: A Pictorial History of the University of Florida, in 1986 with Langley Press.

Proctor became a professor of history at the UF and taught at the university for 50 years.

Proctor was a leading figure in the development of oral history. He founded the Oral History Program in 1967 (which is now one of the largest oral history programs in the United States) and was its director. The program was later renamed the Samuel Proctor Oral History Program in his honor.

A noted an expert on Florida history, he edited the journal Florida Historical Quarterly for over 40 years. He held the titles of Julian C. Yonge Professor of Florida History and Distinguished Service Professor of History. Proctor also held the post of Curator of History at the Florida Museum of Natural History and was the director of the Center for Florida Studies. Proctor also served as the University of Florida Historian. He established the University Archives and wrote major works on the university's history. Proctor is also credited with helping to establish the Center for Jewish Studies at UF.

Proctor was one of two academics to be on the 1998 Lakeland Ledger list of the "50 Most Important Floridians of the 20th Century," selected by a panel of distinguished Floridians.

Proctor retired from teaching in 1993 but remained involved with the university, maintaining an office in Turlington Hall and heading several University of Florida Alumni Association and University of Florida Foundation committees.

Proctor also served as an expert witness in court and received a Lifetime Achievement Award from the Florida Historical Society. The Samuel Proctor Endowment was established in his honor for history graduate students, known as Samuel Proctor Scholars.

Proctor was a longtime friend of Bob Graham, the Florida governor and U.S. Senator who was one of his students.

== Writings ==
- The Substance of Things Hoped For; A Memoir of African-American Faith
- Samuel Proctor: My Moral Odyssey
- Eighteenth-Century Florida and the Revolutionary South, editor
- Napoleon Bonaparte Broward: Florida's Fighting Democrat

== See also ==
- Samuel Proctor Oral History Program
- List of University of Florida honorary degree recipients
- University of Florida Digital Collections
