= Detroit Committee to End the War in Vietnam =

The Detroit Committee to End the War in Vietnam (DCEWV) was the citywide anti-war organization that mobilized numerous actions in Detroit, United States between 1965 and 1973 and helped bring thousands of people to mass protests in Washington, D.C. Often there was internal conflict over slogans and politics within the group between social democrats, members of Students for a Democratic Society, and the Socialist Workers Party, which finally gained ascendency.

The DCEWV was supplanted by the Detroit Coalition to End the War Now, which was a broader organization.

Much of the history is available through contemporary reports in the Fifth Estate newspaper available at different archives including the University of Michigan's Labadie Collection.

== See also ==
- Winter Soldier Investigation
