= Tod Ensign =

American veterans' rights lawyer (1941-2014)

- Born: Thomas Decatur Ensign; 1941; Michigan, U.S.
- Died: May 2014 (aged 72–73)
- Education: Michigan State University (BA, 1963); Wayne State University (J.D., 1966)
- Occupation(s): Lawyer, Writer
- Organizations: Citizen Soldier; Different Drummer Café
- Spouse: Francine Smilen

Thomas Decatur "Tod" Ensign (1941– May 2014) was an American veterans' rights lawyer, writer, and director of Citizen Soldier, a non-profit GI and veterans' rights advocacy group based in New York City.

== Early life and education ==
Ensign was born in Michigan, the second child of Winfield Scott Ensign and Gretchen McKinstry Ensign. He graduated from Michigan State University in 1963 with a BA in Social Science. Ensign held two law degrees, a Master of Laws (LLM) from NYU and Juris Doctor (J.D.) from Wayne State University.

== Veterans' rights activism ==
Ensign co-founded Citizen Soldier in 1969 to advocate on behalf of GIs and veterans who work to oppose command-tolerated racism, sexism, homophobia and militarism. In 1985, the group represented 8,000 veterans nationwide. (After Ensign's death, the Citizen Soldier website went dormant.) He was also intimately involved with the Citizens Commission of Inquiry, also formed in 1969, which was founded to document American atrocities throughout Indochina.

As an attorney, Ensign participated in a broad range of legal cases involving GIs and veterans. Two notable cases are the Agent Orange class action, which attempted to hold chemical manufacturers liable for the injuries their herbicide caused Vietnam veterans and their offspring, and the Vietnam-era Winter Soldier Investigation and National Veterans Inquiry.

Following the invasion of Iraq in 2003, Citizen Soldier attorneys, including Ensign, counseled hundreds of GIs and reservists seeking alternatives to serving in what many regard as an illegal war. The most celebrated case was Citizen Soldier's defense of Sgt. Camilo Mejía, the first US combat veteran to refuse further service in Iraq. He based his refusal on his duty, according to international law, that it is illegal to obey military orders that violate international law. During his five months in Iraq, he claims he witnessed command-sanctioned shooting of civilians, abuse of detainees and other violations.

In 2006, Ensign founded the Different Drummer Café near Watertown, New York, which strove to connect and inform service members. The cafe was located near Fort Drum — thus, its name.

Beginning in 2000, Ensign served on the executive board of the National Gulf War Resource Center, a coalition of Gulf War advocacy groups that advocates for research and health care for veterans from both Gulf wars. (He was the only non-veteran serving on this board).

== Publications ==
Ensign was the author of two books — Military Life: The Insider's Guide (Prentice Hall, 2000) and America's Military Today: The Challenge of Militarism (New Press, 2004). He was coauthor (with Michael Uhl) of GI Guinea Pigs (Playboy, 1980) the first exposé of how US soldiers were harmed by nuclear fallout during A-bomb tests and the herbicide Agent Orange that was used during the Vietnam War.

He also contributed chapters to four other books — Ten Excellent Reasons Not to Join the Military (New Press, 2006) Against the Vietnam War: Writings by Activists (Syracuse U. Press, 1999), Metal of Dishonor: Depleted Uranium (IAC Press, 1997), and Collateral Damage: The New World Order at Home and Abroad (South Press, 1992, ISBN 978-0-89608-422-3).

Furthermore, he wrote dozens of articles for The Progressive, In These Times, Radical America, The American Pathologist, the New York Daily News, Toward Freedom, Against the Current, the Weekly Guardian, the Non Violent Resister, The Indypendent, and several others.

== Personal life ==
He and his partner Francine Smilen had one daughter, Rachel Ensign.
