= Kill box =

Target reference area in weaponry

In weaponry, a kill box is a three-dimensional target area, defined to facilitate the integration of coordinated joint weapons fire. The space is defined by an area reference system, but could follow terrain features, be located by grid coordinates or a radius from a center point.

== Definition ==
It is a joint forces coordination measure enabling air assets to engage surface targets without needing further coordination with commanders and without terminal attack control. Such a joint coordination measure can help commanders focus the effort of air and indirect fire assets, and also restrict the trajectories and effects of surface-to-surface fires. There may be no-fire areas (NFAs), restricted operations areas (ROAs), and airspace coordination areas (ACAs) included. No friendly ground forces should go into a kill box unless covered by a no-fire area.

A type of fire support coordinating measure (FSCM), a kill box is often defined by a grid reference system based on lines of latitude and longitude, superimposed upon a map of an area of operation. Each square of the grid may be sub-divided into smaller boxes, each of which may carry its own level of permission or restriction on the use of air-to-surface or surface-to-surface weapons.

First developed by the U.S. Air Force in the late 1980s, the technique gained notoriety through its use during the first Gulf War (1991). The U.S. Air Force further refined tactics, techniques, and procedures of kill box employment throughout the 1990s, leading to more efficient prosecution of targets. During the 2003 invasion of Iraq, they were once again used in support of the initial invasion.

Use of kill boxes is now part of Joint U.S. Doctrine and is used by many of the U.S.'s allies.

== Types ==
- Blue: Permits air-to-surface fires in the Kill Box without further coordination or deconfliction with friendly forces.
- Purple: Reduces the coordination requirements for air-to-surface fires, while still allowing surface component commanders to employ surface-to-surface fire. It allows the maximum use of joint fires, creating a synergistic effect and maximum potential for neutralizing enemy forces.

== Misconceptions ==
While engagement authority is automatically granted by the establishment of a kill box, it does not relieve weapons system operators of the responsibility for complying with requirements such as commander's designated target priority, positive identification (PID), collateral damage assessments, rules of engagement (ROE), and special instructions (SPINS).

== See also ==
- Free-fire zone
