= Gainesville Eight =

Vietnam War protesters

The Gainesville Eight were a group of anti-Vietnam War activists indicted on charges of conspiracy to disrupt the 1972 Republican National Convention in Miami Beach, Florida. All eight defendants were acquitted.

Vietnam Veterans Against the War had planned to demonstrate against the ongoing Vietnam War during the convention. After learning from FBI informants and agents within the VVAW about possible plans for disruption and violence, the Department of Justice initiated a grand jury investigation. Eight of the people investigated were indicted by the government on charges of conspiracy to disrupt the convention: John Briggs, Scott Camil, Alton Foss, John Kniffin, Peter Mahoney, Stanley Michelson, William Patterson, and Don Perdue. All but Briggs were Vietnam veterans.

While organizing protests, the group received information that during the convention the government was going to shoot someone or use explosives and blame it on the antiwar protesters. They were also going to raise the five drawbridges so that antiwar demonstrators would be trapped on Miami Beach and shot by police and soldiers during the commotion. In response to this information, the VVAW group planned to draw those police and soldiers away by attacking federal buildings, police stations, and fire stations in the two adjacent counties to occupy the government forces, then reopen bridges to aid escape of the demonstrators. These plans were typed up and distributed among the rest of the group by a VVAW member and undercover FBI agent, Bill Lemmer. The eight were accused of planning to use automatic weapons, explosives, incendiary devices, as well as slingshots and crossbows.

The jury got to read the letter containing all the proposed plans on attacking the federal buildings, but they also got to read the constantly repeated admonition in the letter, "This will be done for defensive purposes only." The jury saw that their goal was to protect the rights of the protesters, and they acquitted the eight men of all charges without the need for them to present a defense. In Camil's words, "We had no conspiracy to disrupt the convention. Our conspiracy, if you want to call it that, was to go down to the convention and exercise our Constitutional rights as citizens and to defend those rights against anybody who tried to take away those rights, whether it be the government or anyone else. And the jury sided with us."

Bill Lemmer, the Southern regional assistant coordinator of Vietnam Veterans Against the War, revealed himself as an undercover FBI operative in May 1972. Bill Lemmer had been thrown out of a 'fast'/protest by DCVC(VVAW) on the Capitol steps in Washington D.C. in January 1972 after advocating for violent, destructive actions on the Washington Monument. A deposition to that effect was sent to the trial in Gainesville. During the 1973 trial it was revealed that the VVAW had been infiltrated by government agents and informants, such as Emmerson Poe and Lemmer. Showing that these agents provocateur led the illegal activities severely damaged the prosecution's case. The prosecution also tried to use the defendant's Vietnam records as indication that these were violent people.

The jury acquitted all eight after less than four hours of deliberation.

Jack Carrouth was one of the attorneys for the prosecution. Brady Coleman was one of the attorneys for the defense.

Folk singers Pete Seeger and Phil Ochs expressed support for the group, as did Ron Kovic.
