= Fire support coordinating measure =

A fire support coordination measure (FSCM) is one of any number of means to facilitate planning and executing rapid engagement of targets with the appropriate weapon or group of weapons, while simultaneously providing safeguards for everything else on the battlefield.
