= Workforce Development Institute =

- Abbreviation: WDI
- Formation: 2003
- Location: Albany, New York
- Website: www.wdiny.org

Workforce Development Institute (WDI) is headquartered in Albany, New York, and has 10 regional offices throughout New York State (Capital Region, Central New York, Hudson Valley, Long Island, Lower Hudson Valley, Mohawk Valley, New York City, North Country, Rochester/Genesee Valley, and Western New York).

== About ==
WDI is a statewide non-profit that works to grow and keep good jobs in New York State. WDI uses a range of tools - including ground level information, workforce expertise, and funding - to facilitate projects that build skills and strengthen employer's ability to hire and promote workers. WDI's work often fills gaps not covered by other organizations.

== History ==
WDI began in 2003 as a partner to the New York State AFL–CIO and Area Labor Federations to provide workforce training and education services to regional and local unions. Its role has since evolved and is now focused more broadly on the growth and retention of good jobs in NYS through a variety of mechanisms including partnerships and collaborations with businesses, unions, other non-profits, educational institutions, and government.

== Services ==
=== Workforce Development ===
WDI works regionally to identify targeted strategies that address workforce development opportunities and challenges. These strategies can include partnerships, training and/or funding.

- Regional Solutions: WDI's strength is its ability to identify trends, quickly fill gaps not covered by other programs, and then move successful programs throughout the state.
- Interactive Grants Program: Through a unique grants program, WDI makes investments that lead to workforce development and economic growth. This program is an “interactive” one, where WDI regional staff work directly with a business, union, or other entity to understand the issue at hand, and then help develop a response. Although WDI works in all sectors of the economy, it has a special interest in two growing sectors that hold particular promise in terms of good jobs: Manufacturing and Energy.

=== Workforce Support ===
Many issues impact individuals’ capacity, productivity and earnings in the workplace market. WDI provides programs and services to help individuals thrive in the workplace.

- Child Care Subsidy Program: Many families in New York State struggle with the high cost of quality child care even when they are working full-time or nearly full-time. WDI's Child Care Subsidy Facilitated Enrollment Program helps eligible working families apply for financial assistance. WDI staff are available to answer questions and guide families through the application process. In addition, WDI can provide information to aid families in choosing quality, developmentally appropriate care for their children. The subsidy program is currently active in the following counties: Albany, Schenectady, Rensselaer, Schenectady, Erie, Monroe, Oneida, and Onondaga.
- Employee Assistance Program: In today's complex world, balancing work-life issues can be challenging. To that end, WDI works with Employee Services, Inc. to offer a comprehensive Employee Assistance Program to businesses and unions at a reduced rate.

=== Workforce Enrichment ===
WDI works to build stronger communities by integrating arts, culture, and thought leadership into workforce development efforts.

- Arts and Culture: WDI supports the training of individuals for employment within the arts and culture sector and creative economies, opportunities that provide working people the means to express themselves and represent their own lives through the medium of art and culture, and efforts that capture, celebrate and share diverse artistic and cultural practices focusing on work.
- Publications:
  - Working Stories - Essays by Reflective Practitioners, began as an idea from the WDI Executive Director, Ed Murphy, to capture the life stories, lessons learned, and paths taken from a group of individuals involved in workforce development in NYS. This collection of essays is intended to generate dialogue around paths to development and perhaps serve as guideposts to others navigating similar waters.
  - Each year the WDI celebrates women and the contributions they make to the workplace through the Women Working calendar that features extraordinary women and their stories.

== See also ==
- Art of labor
