= Citizens Commission of Inquiry =

American antiwar organization (1969–1971)

The National Committee for a Citizens Commission of Inquiry on U.S. war crimes in Vietnam (CCI) was founded in New York in November 1969 by Ralph Schoenman. The purpose was to document American wartime atrocities throughout Indochina. The founding of the organization was prompted by Seymour Hersh's disclosure on November 13, 1969 in The St. Louis Post-Dispatch concerning the March 1968 My Lai massacre. CCI was the first organization to bring to public attention the testimony of Vietnam War veterans who had witnessed or participated in atrocities.

== Origins ==
Schoenman had previously worked on the International War Crimes Tribunal founded by Bertrand Russell.

CCI had a policy‐making board that included Schoenman, Noam Chomsky, Dick Gregory, Melvin L. Wulf, director of the Legal Department, American Civil Liberties Union, Eric Seitz, executive secretary, National Lawyers Guild and Andy Stapp.

Schoenman soon left CCI in the hands of two New Left anti-war activists, Tod Ensign and Jeremy Rifkin. They were joined in early 1970 by several Vietnam War veterans, including Robert Bowie Johnson, a West Point graduate and former infantry captain, and Michael Uhl, a retired 1st lieutenant in military intelligence.

== American Vietnam War veterans and GIs offer personal witness to war crimes ==
=== Overview ===
CCI's first press conference occurred in Toronto, Canada on March 4, 1970. Ensign and Rifkin convened three more press conferences in the following two months: Springfield, Massachusetts (April 6, 1970); New York City, New York and Los Angeles, California (April 14); and Boston, Massachusetts (May 7, 1970). Uhl then traveled to Sweden and Australia to brief reporters that Vietnam veterans had first-hand knowledge of atrocities they had either witnessed or committed themselves. CCI continued to host press conferences in other cities, culminating in a three-day National Veterans Inquiry on December 1–3, 1970 in Washington, D.C.

The testimony offered by veterans at these events provided documentation that American atrocities in Vietnam were not uncommon. This evidence was a counterpoint to the U.S. Army command's claim that the My Lai massacre was an exception. CCI asserted that atrocities committed by American soldiers were a result of military field policies like "search-and-destroy", "free-fire zones", "forced urbanization", and the saturation bombing of villages believed to be controlled by enemy forces.

=== Major events ===
- April 7, 1970: David Bressam, a former Army officer; Peter Fossell, a former Marine Corps rifleman; and Robert B. Johnson, a former Army captain and chaplain. They allege that Col. Lewis Beasley, 1st Air Cav Div of 9th Cavalry, from his helicopter killed Vietnamese civilians who were "taking evasive action." Location: Central highlands north of Đăk Tô. Date: August 1967.
- May 7, 1970: Larry Rottman, a retired first lieutenant, affirmed that he had seen nerve gas stored at the Bien Hoa American air base while stationed there in 1967 and 1968. Michael Uhl, 1st Lt., military intelligence, Americal Division, witnessed electrical torture 15 times.
- July 19, 1970: Six recently returned Army veterans tell of using electricity to torture prisoners. The veterans offering testimony are: Robert Stemme, Sgt, 172nd Military Intelligence Dept., attached to 173rd Airborne Brigade; Michael Uhl, 1st Lt., military intelligence, Americal Division; Peter Martinsen, Sp/5, 542nd MI Detachment, 101st Airborne Division; John Patton, 2nd Lt., 11th Regiment, Americal Division; Edward Murphy, Sgt., 4th MI Detachment, 4th Infantry Division; Fred Brown, 172nd Military Intelligence Dept., attached to 173rd Airborne Brigade.
- October 28, 1970: Mike McCusker, Sgt., 1st Battalion, 5th Regiment, 5th Marine Infantry Division, reveals that on September 6, 1966, his unit destroyed everything that moved in two villages near Chu Lai. Michael Shepherd, Special Forces medic, 101st Airborne Division, reported witnessing the shooting of wounded prisoners. Nick Kinler, chemical warfare specialist, told of witnessing the massacre by American troops of villagers who were chased from bunkers by tear gas.
- November 24, 1970: Three active duty officers and three veterans blame U.S. commanders for policies that lead to atrocities committed by ground-level troops. The active duty Army officers, all stationed at Fort Meade, Maryland, were: Capt. Edward Fox, Capt. Grier Merwin, and Capt. Robert Masters. The three veterans were: Louis Font, Lt., a West Point graduate; Robert Johnson, Army Capt.; and T. Griffith Ellison, Marine Corps Lance Corporal.
- December 1–3, 1970: Forty veterans of the Vietnam War testify in the Dupont Plaza Hotel in Washington, D.C., at the National Veterans Inquiry into U.S. War Crimes Policy. They testify about the atrocities they either witnessed or participated in. They share a single opinion that war crimes committed by American soldiers in Vietnam were the logical consequence of command policies. Among those testifying were four West Point graduates: Louis Font, Robert Master, Bob Johnson and Gordon Livingston. Others whose testimony was cited by reporters include Steven Hassett (1st Air Cavalry Division), Stephen S. Naetzel (Sgt.), Edward Murphy (Sgt.), and Kenneth B. Osborne (intelligence specialist).
- April 26–27, 1971: [slug: Dellums hearings]
- August 2, 1971: Michael Uhl gave testimony about the Phoenix Program under oath to the Congressional Foreign Operations and Government Information Subcommittee of the Committee on Government Operations of the U.S. House of Representatives.

== Impact and legacy ==
Telford Taylor, former chief U.S. prosecutor at the Nuremberg trials, stated on the Dick Cavett Show that General William Westmoreland might be convicted as a war criminal if Nuremberg principles from World War II were applied to the Vietnam War. Taylor attributed his opinion to the evidence of atrocities and war crimes offered by veterans and active-duty soldiers, and collected by CCI. Taylor, himself a retired brigadier general in the Army Reserve, explained that the U.S. Army had used the Nuremberg standard in the trial of Japanese General Tomoyuki Yamashita, who was convicted of war crimes and hanged for atrocities carried out by his troops in the Philippines.

The Concerned Officers Movement (COM) held two CCI-sponsored press conferences—on January 12, 1971 in Washington, D.C., and January 20, 1971 in Los Angeles—calling for an investigation into the "responsibility for war crimes of key military figures", including Generals William Westmoreland and Creighton Abrams, and Admiral Elmo Zumwalt. The Washington, D.C. COM members were: Capt. Robert Master, USA and Capt. Grier Merwin, USA, both doctors; Capt. Edward G. Fox, a zoologist in the Army Medical Service Corps; First Lieutenant Louis Font, a West Point graduate; and LTJG Peter Dunkelberger, USN, a management systems analyst stationed at the Pentagon. In Los Angeles were LT Norman Banks, USAF, LTJG Ted Shallcross, USN, LT James Skelly, USN, and LTJG John Kent, USN, an Annapolis graduate, all-American wrestler and jet fighter pilot.

The Winter Soldier Investigation, which ran from January 31, 1971 to February 2, 1971, followed in the path of CCI and the Russell Tribunal. This media event was organized by Vietnam Veterans Against the War, and some of its leaders cited the work of CCI for establishing the credibility of veterans' voices of dissent. However, internal divisions between CCI and Vietnam Veterans Against the War led to each working independently of the other.

The Citizens Commission of Inquiry disbanded in December 1971.

== See also ==
- Congressman Ron Dellums' War Crimes Hearings: Informational hearings called by Congressman Ron Dellums (Democrat – California) on April 25, 1971, on the topic of war crimes committed by U.S. military forces during the Vietnam War.
- Vietnam War Crimes Working Group: Documentary evidence compiled by a Pentagon task force detailing war crimes committed by U.S. troops.
- War crimes by American military during the Vietnam War: Summary of war crimes during the Vietnam War by American forces, compiled from a variety of sources.
- Winter Soldier Investigation: A media event sponsored by the Vietnam Veterans Against the War (VVAW) from January 31, 1971 to February 2, 1971, to publicize war crimes and atrocities by the United States Armed Forces and their allies in the Vietnam War.
