= Free-fire zone =

Area into which any weapon system may fire without additional coordination

A free-fire zone is an area in which any person present is deemed an enemy combatant who can be targeted by opposing military forces. The concept of a free-fire zone does not exist in international law, and failing to distinguish between combatants and civilians is a war crime.

== World War II ==
General Chuck Yeager in his autobiography describes his (and his associates') disapproval of shoot-anything-that-moves low level strafing missions during World War II (although they were not necessarily called "free-fire zone" missions). He described his feeling that, had the U.S. lost the war, it might have been considered criminal.

== Vietnam War ==
Returning veterans, affected civilians and others have said that U.S. Military Assistance Command, Vietnam (MACV), based on the assumption that all friendly forces had been cleared from the area, established a policy designating "free-fire zones" as areas in which:

- Anyone unidentified is considered an enemy combatant
- Soldiers were to shoot anyone moving around after curfew without first making sure that they were hostile.

Gunter Lewy estimated that 1/3 of those killed and counted as "enemy KIA" killed by US/GVN forces were civilians. He estimates around 220,000 civilians were counted as "enemy KIA" in battlefield operations reports during battles against VC/NVA. Lewy estimated the use of free-fire zones was an important factor in this. There are no distinctions between enemy KIA and civilian KIA inadvertently killed in the crossfire or through deployment of heavy artillery, aerial bombardment and so-on. Part of this stemmed from the doctrine requirements of producing "enemy body count" during the Vietnam War, which saw violations and statistical manipulations due to ongoing pressures from MACV on units.

=== Dellums hearings ===
Free-fire zones were discussed during 1971 ad hoc (i.e. not endorsed by Congress) hearings sponsored by Congressman Ron Dellums (California), organized by Citizens' Commission of Inquiry on US War Crimes (CCI).

=== Lawrence Wilkerson ===
Colonel Lawrence Wilkerson flew helicopters low and slow through Vietnam. He claims to have had vocal disagreements with some of his superiors and members of his own gunner crew over free-fire zones, including an incident in which one of his crew shot a wagon that had a little girl inside of it. He describes one incident in which he prevented an atrocity by purposely placing his helicopter between a position that was full of civilians and another helicopter that wanted to launch an attack on the position.

== Israel–Hamas war ==
Israel has been accused of treating Gaza as a free-fire zone during the war.

== See also ==
- Rules of engagement
- Area bombing
- Strategic Hamlet Program
- Search and destroy
- Kill box
