= National Veterans Inquiry =

The National Veterans' Inquiry was a national-level inquiry into American war crimes in Vietnam. They were held December 1–3, 1970, in Washington, DC.

== Origin ==
In November 1969, after the My Lai massacre was revealed in the U.S. press, the Bertrand Russell Foundation, with antiwar activists Jeremy Rifkin and lawyer Tod Ensign, organized the Citizens Commission of Inquiry (CCI) in the United States to document American war crimes in Vietnam. The CCI, held their first inquiry in February 1970 in Annapolis, Maryland.

Further inquiries were held in Springfield, Massachusetts; Richmond, Virginia; New York City; Buffalo; Boston; Minneapolis; Los Angeles; and, Portland, Oregon. In some cities, the commissions were co-sponsored by antiwar coalitions, in others they were organized independently.

Men who had taken part in the CIA's Phoenix Program described it as a program based on terror, torture, and assassination. Participants in the Operation Speedy Express filed confidential reports "of helicopter gunships mowing down noncombatants, of airstrikes on villages, of farmers gunned down in their fields while commanders pressed relentlessly for high body counts" amounting to a My Lai each month for over a year. Veterans of the operation spoke about the killing of civilians at the National Veterans' Inquiry in Washington, D.C.
