= Women's Court for the Former Yugoslavia =

Symbolic feminist initiative, 2010–2015

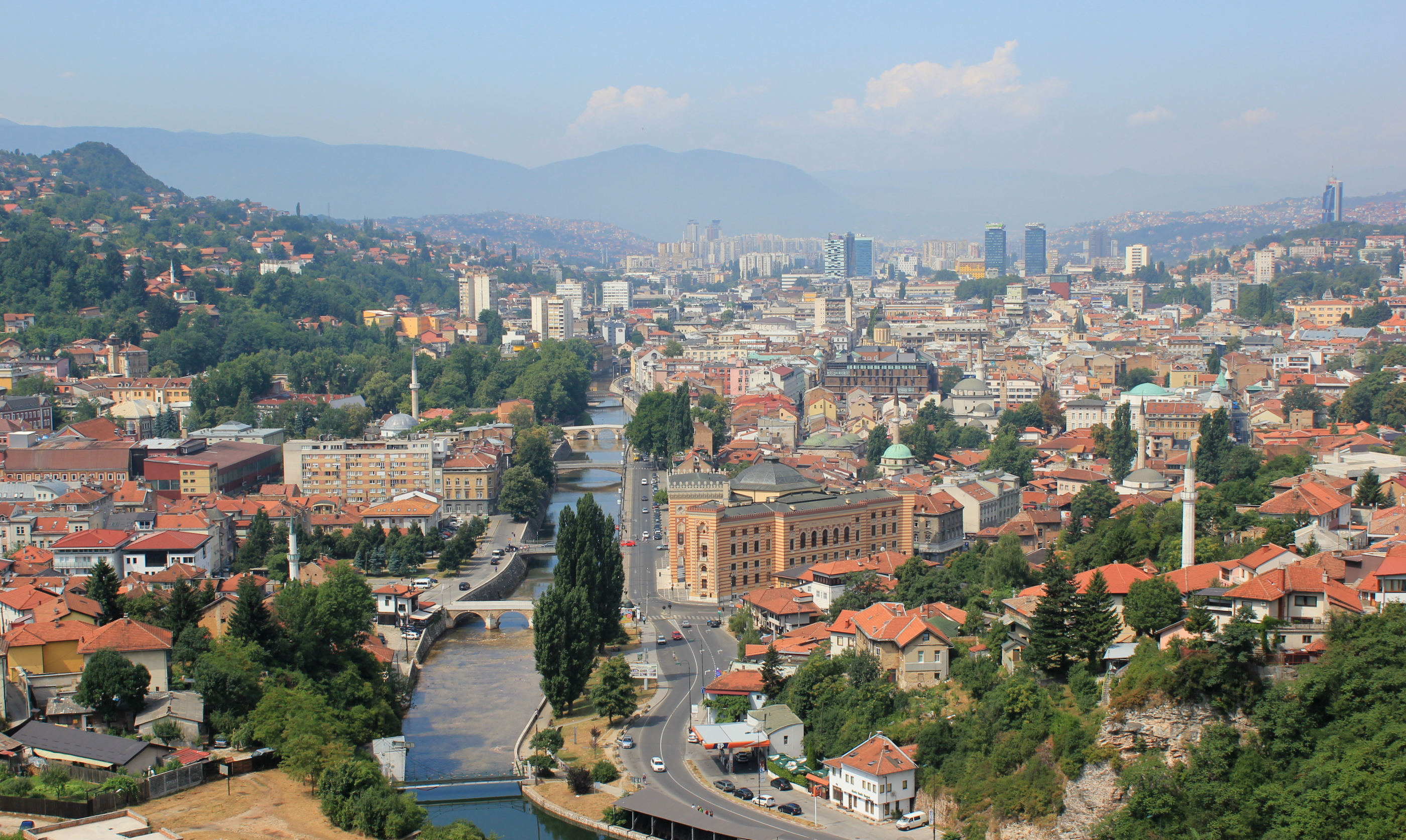
City of Sarajevo, the capital and largest city of Bosnia and Herzegovina,

The Women's Court for Former Yugoslavia was a symbolic feminist initiative organized by regional women's groups from Yugoslavia as a platform for women to share their wartime and post-war experiences. Though not an official judicial body, it convened in Sarajevo in May 2015 in response to the gendered violence during the Yugoslav conflicts of the 1990s, including sexual violence, ethnic persecution, displacement, militarized abuse, and economic deprivation.

The Court aimed to supplement, rather than replace, the work of the International Criminal Tribunal for the Former Yugoslavia (ICTY), the UN tribunal responsible for prosecuting war crimes in the region from 1991 to 2001. Rather than pursuing legal prosecution, the Court embodied a feminist, restorative approach to justice that centered survivor testimony, acknowledgement of harm, and collective healing offering a form of recognition that formal courts, including the ICTY, did not provide.

Organized through regional workshops and survivor preparation between 2010 and 2015, the Court brought together thirty-six survivors and twelve experts who testified before a seven-member council in thematic panels on gendered wartime violence. The Court issued non-binding findings calling for broader public recognition of these harms and helped build a solid model for future women's courts.

The Court is generally viewed positively by scholars for its novel and groundbreaking approach, though some argue that its brief duration and narrow scope limited its broader impact. While it generated little direct policy change, researchers note that it offered meaningful support to survivors and helped preserve women's wartime and post-war narratives.

== Background ==
After World War II, transitional justice mechanisms emerged as legal tools to address atrocities. However, in the following decades, these mechanisms seldom represented gendered or community-based perspectives.

Prior to the Women's Court for the Former Yugoslavia, women's courts existed for two decades, beginning in 1992 with the first court in Lahore, Pakistan. Since then, approximately 40 tribunals were largely in the Global South, including in Bangalore, Cairo, Tokyo (1994), Kathmandu (1995), Beirut, Beijing, Nairobi, Cape Town (2001), and Lusaka (2004). At these tribunals, women publicly named human rights abuses committed against them, ranging from war crimes to political violence against Indigenous and marginalized communities. Gender-based injustices that state and national courts ignored were addressed, including domestic violence, sexual assault, honor killings, dowry-related abuse, and other forms of discrimination. Many of these tribunals issued non-binding recommendations for legal reforms and policy changes, community-based reparations, as well as a public acknowledgement of women's rights violations.

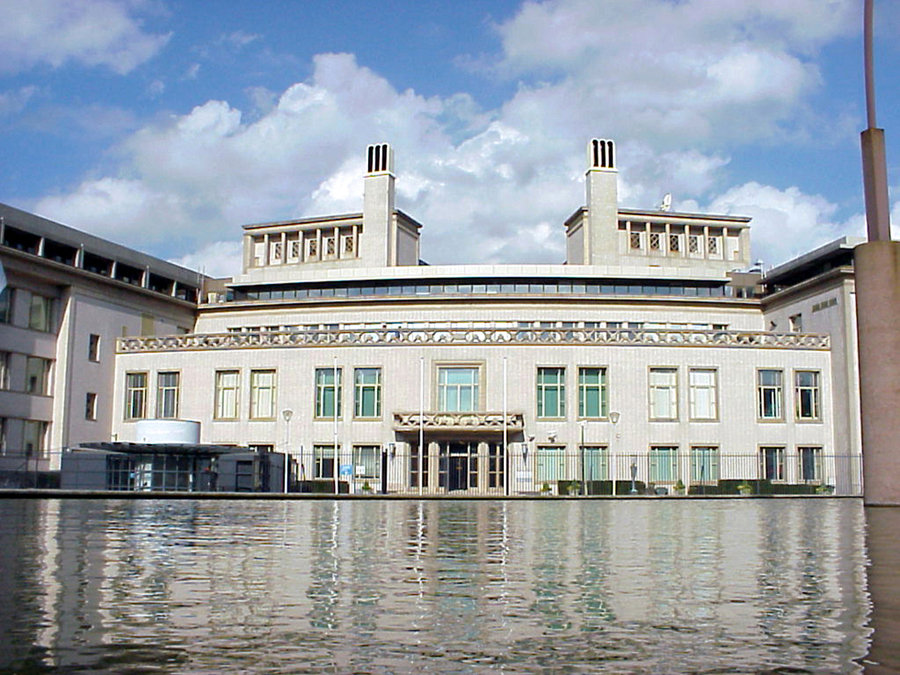
International Criminal Tribunal for the Former Yugoslavia (ICTY)

Feminist groups argued that mainstream judicial mechanisms after the break-up of Yugoslavia, including the International Criminal Tribunal for the Former Yugoslavia (ICTY), would not adequately address the wide range of crimes committed during the 1991-1999 wars. During this conflict, sexual violence was widespread and employed as tools of ethnic persecution and intimidation, as women were subjected to systematic rape, forced prostitution, and sexual enslavement. Additionally, feminist activists asserted sexual violence survivors were treated in a traumatizing manner in formal courtrooms. Their testimonies were not only tightly controlled, but antipathetic questioning was common and they felt reduced to legal evidence rather than human beings.

In response, the organizers of the Women's Court turned to a feminist conceptualization that emphasized dignity, agency, and public acknowledgement for survivors, rather than punitive outcomes. This approach created a trauma-informed and respectful environment that allowed survivors to narrate their experiences in their own terms and recognized sexual violence as a central feature of the conflict. Thus, the Court aimed to offer additional forms of recognition that mainstream legal institutions did not provide.

Zarana Papic, a Serbian feminist anthropologist, and Corinne Kumar, an Indian human-rights activist and co-founder of the World Courts of Women, first proposed establishing a Women's Court in Sarajevo in 2000. However, after Papic's death in 2002, organizational and regional challenges forced the initiative to be postponed for several years.

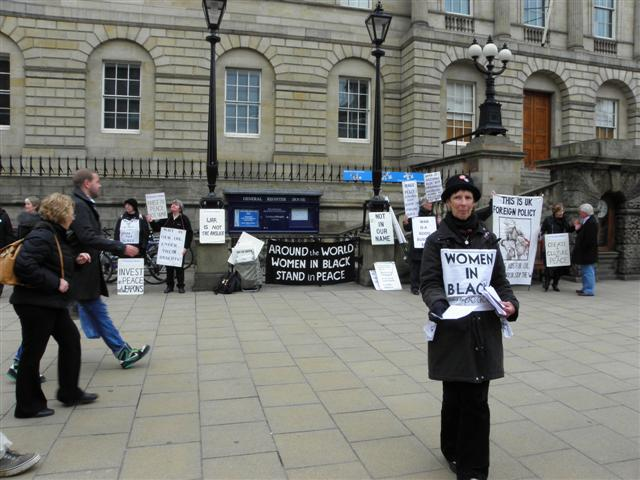
Women in Black protesters

Calls for the Court revived after Slobodan Milosevic, the former President of Serbia and later of the Federal Republic of Yugoslavia, died in The Hague in 2006 while on trial before the International Criminal Tribunal for the Former Yugoslavia (ICTY). The main indictment charged him with crimes against humanity, war crimes, and genocide-related offenses committed during the Yugoslav wars. However, Milosevic was neither convicted nor formally held accountable for any of the crimes he committed, because he died before a verdict could be reached. As a result, many believed that the judicial process failed to deliver a sense of justice and the Women in Black, a Serbian feminist anti-war organization, revived efforts to establish the Women's Court. They argued that mainstream legal mechanisms did not address the full range of harms experienced. The group sought alternative, feminist forms of justice that could acknowledge the gender-based violence, political repression, ethnic persecution, displacement, and other abuses committed under Milosevic's regime.

The Women in Black, with regional feminist and peace organizations throughout Yugoslavia, proposed the original initiative. This envisioned a public hearing or tribunal to examine abuses committed from September 1987 to October 2000, the period marking the rise and fall of Milosevic's reign, and encompassing the territory of the former Yugoslavia. This proposal later expanded to include events from the early 2000s and transformed into a broader coalition effort that involved civil society groups and peace activists throughout the region.

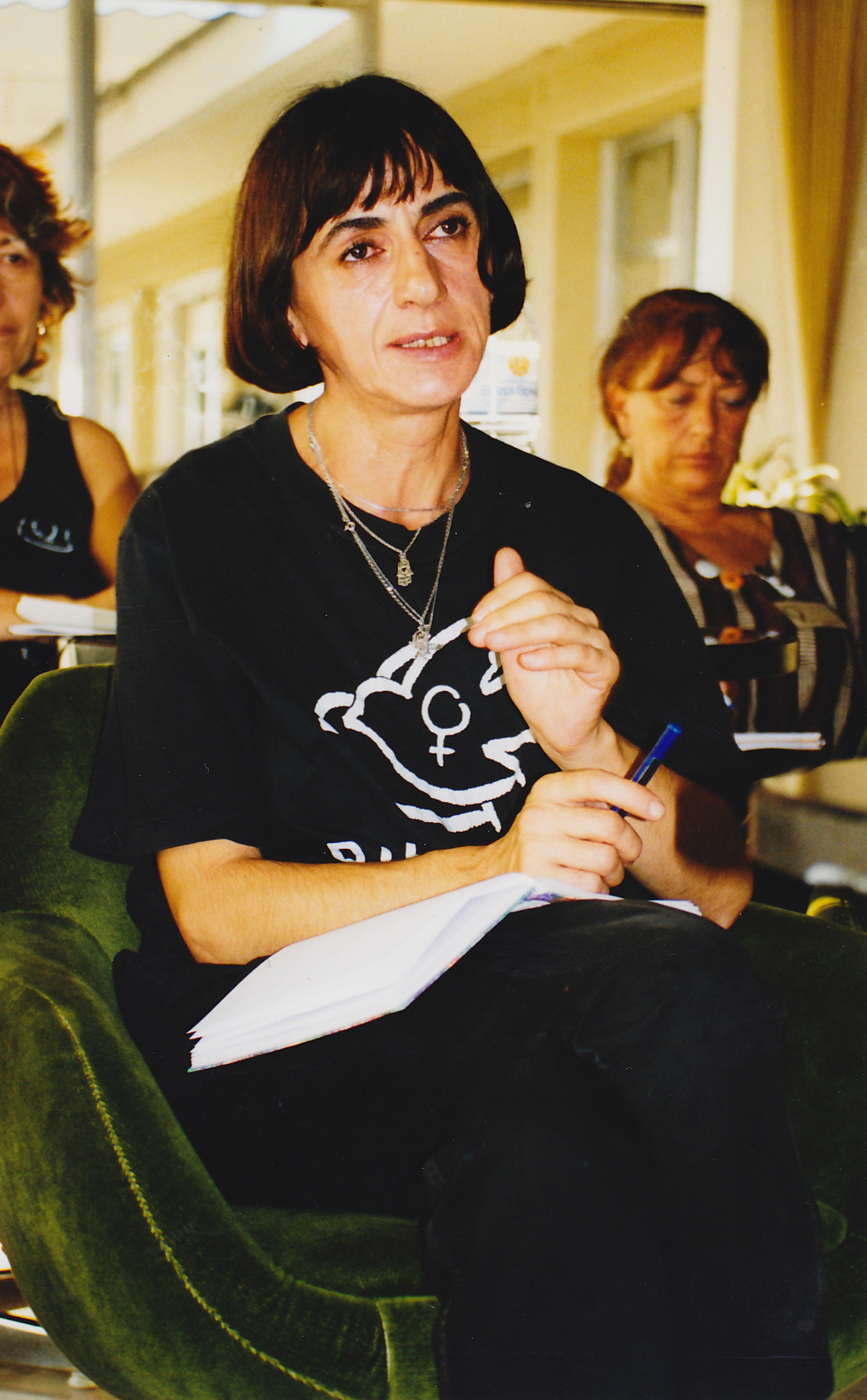
Stasa Zajovic in 1999 co-founder and coordinator of Women in Black in Belgrade, Serbia.

When organizers realized the original vision for a women's tribunal could not be executed at the time in 2007, they proposed another, related initiative. Numerous civil rights, feminist, and pacifist organizations organized to create a Women's Tribunal/Court to serve as a supplementary process aimed specifically at achieving justice for women survivors, whose experiences were often marginalized in mainstream judicial mechanisms. A series of discussions and informal meetings created a core organizing group, including Nuna Zvizdic (a Bosnian women's rights activist), Biljana Kasic (a Croatian feminist scholar), and Stasa Zajovic (co-founder of Women in Black). In 2010, Nela Pamukovic (founder of Zagreb's Centre for Women War Victims), Ljupka Kovacevic (Montenegrin feminist activist), Rada Boric (Croatian gender studies scholar), Igballe Rogova (Kosovar women's rights advocate), and Dasa Duhacek (Serbian feminist philosopher) also joined the initiative. In October 2010, the organizers held a preparatory workshop in Sarajevo called the "Court of Women for the Balkans: Justice and Healing," which brought together participants from Mexico, South Africa, Cambodia, Iraq, and India to share their experiences with community-based and feminist approaches to justice.

== Court function ==
Belgrade’s branch of Women in Black, spearheaded preparations for the Women’s Court in the latter half of 2010. In Serbia, organizers held seminars where women shared their stories and activists formulated the restorative justice model foundational to the 2015 Women’s Court in Sarajevo.

In late 2011, prospective presenters at the Women’s Court in Sarajevo prepared to give their testimonies by attending several trainings where Women in Black provided them with instructional materials. In these workshops, the location, scope, and structure of the Court began to take shape.

The initial meeting of the Women’s Court in Sarajevo ran from May 7 to May 10 of 2015. The Court held hearings over the first two days while community events spanned four days. Hearings comprised five panels where thirty-six women afflicted by wartime violence and twelve expert witnesses shared their testimonies. Witnesses testified before mediators and advocates, five hundred public observers, and the Judicial Council of the Court, a body made up of seven non-judicial authorities, four of them from the former Yugoslavia and three of them international residents.

Panels in the Women’s Court were categorized around different kinds of violence women survivors faced. The first panel, titled, “War against the civilian population,” concentrated on aggression against civilians; these included cases in which the victim's gender or ethnicity specifically rendered them a target. The second, “Woman’s body – a battlefield” heard testimonies detailing sexual violence. The third, “Militaristic Violence and Women’s Resistance” heard survivors of militaristic brutality and corresponding expert witnesses. The fourth panel, “Persecution of those who are different, in war and in peace” centered on ethnically motivated violence against women during and beyond the scope of wartime. Finally, the Women's Court identified economic exploitation as the fifth kind of violence its participants survived in its panel, “An undeclared war (social and economic violence, women’s resistance.”

On May 10, the final day of the Court's session in Sarajevo, the Judicial Council announced its initial decisions verbally called the Women's Court Preliminary Decision. The Preliminary Decision was informed by the five categories of violence the Court identified, together with women victims’ testimonies and expert witnesses’ analyses of them. For each type of gendered violence, the Council created a list of offenses they deemed international crimes. This list acknowledged gender-based crimes traditionally excluded from international law as human rights violations enabled by "systems of criminality." The Women's Court Preliminary Decision recognized that testimonies reflected the combined work of militaristic, gender-based, and ethnic violence in suppressing the populace of the former Yugoslavia, determining that "these crimes are intersecting, and the testimonies showed that these crimes crossed and moved beyond the given categories."Their judgements were copied and published in September 2015.

The Women's Court's restorative justice model incorporated legal and extralegal frameworks. The Women's Court encouraged, but did not deliver or enforce traditional legal justice. Rather than implicate or penalize individual war criminals, the Court's judgements called on formal judicial institutions, including national and international criminal courts, to take their proposals into account. By staging a people's court devoid of legal actors, the Women's Court also utilized an untraditional people-centered model of justice. The Court's process and judgements instead centered a transitional model for justice, challenging interworking systems of oppression through public testimonies to facilitate the transition of the former Yugoslavia from war to peace.

== Public reception and impact ==
Scholarship generally portrays the Women's Court for the Former Yugoslavia in a positive light, with many researchers highlighting its novelty. Sociologist Kirsten Campbell calls it "the first transitional justice mechanism to be established in the former Yugoslavia and the first women’s court to solely consider crimes committed in a European conflict." While the Women's Court for the Former Yugoslavia was preceded by and took inspiration from other World Courts of Women, Campbell and others herald the conception of justice employed by its organizers as particularly groundbreaking.

Some scholars—such as Maria O'Reilly, whose work explores the intersections of international politics, conflict, and gender—have taken issue with what they perceive as the shortcomings of the Women's Court for the Former Yugoslavia. O'Reilly argues that the ephemeral nature of the Women's Court severely limited its impact from its inception. She also suggests that the scope of the injustices discussed before the Women's Court was too narrow, noting that testimonies "exclud[ed] recognition of pre-war and post-war periods and the gendered structures of inequality that enable gendered violence and discrimination to emerge and endure." By declining to address this broader context, O'Reilly reasons, the full change-making potential of Women's Court was never fully realized.

There is currently limited evidence, if any, that the Women's Court for the Former Yugoslavia has contributed to legislative action or policy change. However, according to O'Reilly, insofar as the initiative offered women a platform to share about their experiences with wartime sexual violence and connect with fellow survivors, it made "positive contributions" to women's rights activism in the Balkan Peninsula.

International relations analyst Orli Fridman notes that, since the conference itself, the organizers behind Women's Court have compiled "a wealth of archival materials available to future generations of activists who engage with memory activism." This work, argues Fridman, may empower additional Balkan feminists to influence the politics of memory surrounding the breakup of Yugoslavia.
