= Lycée Arago (Paris) =

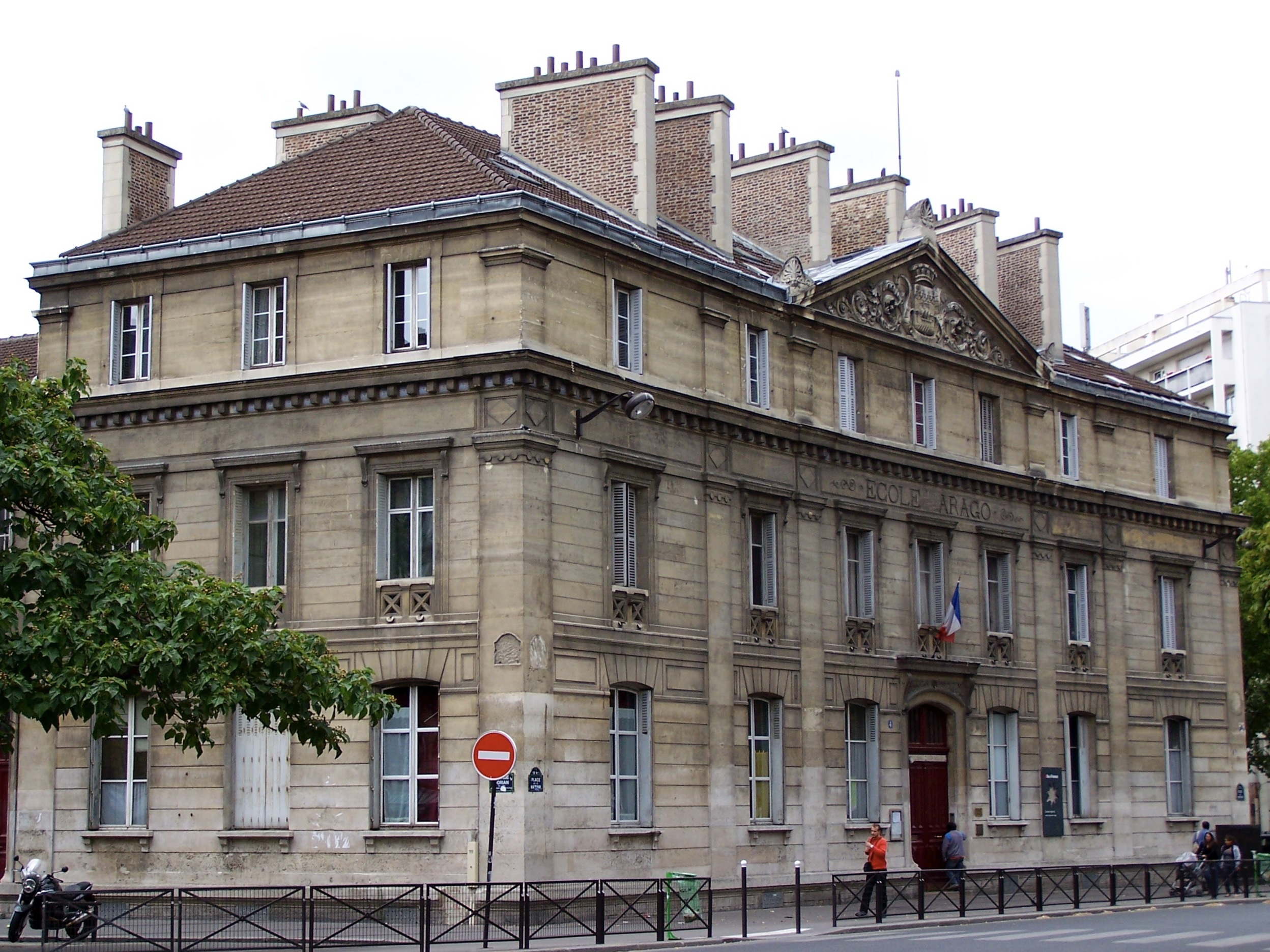
- Entrance of the lycée

Location
- 4 place de la Nation, Paris; France
- Coordinates: 48.847831°N 2.394°E

Information
- Type: Établissement public local d'enseignement (EPLE)
- Principal: Mme Guini
- Enrollment: ~ 670 students
- Website: https://lyc-arago.ac-paris.fr

The lycée Arago is a Parisian secondary school and sixth-form located on place de la Nation. It teaches both general and technical education. It celebrated its centenary in 1980.

== History ==
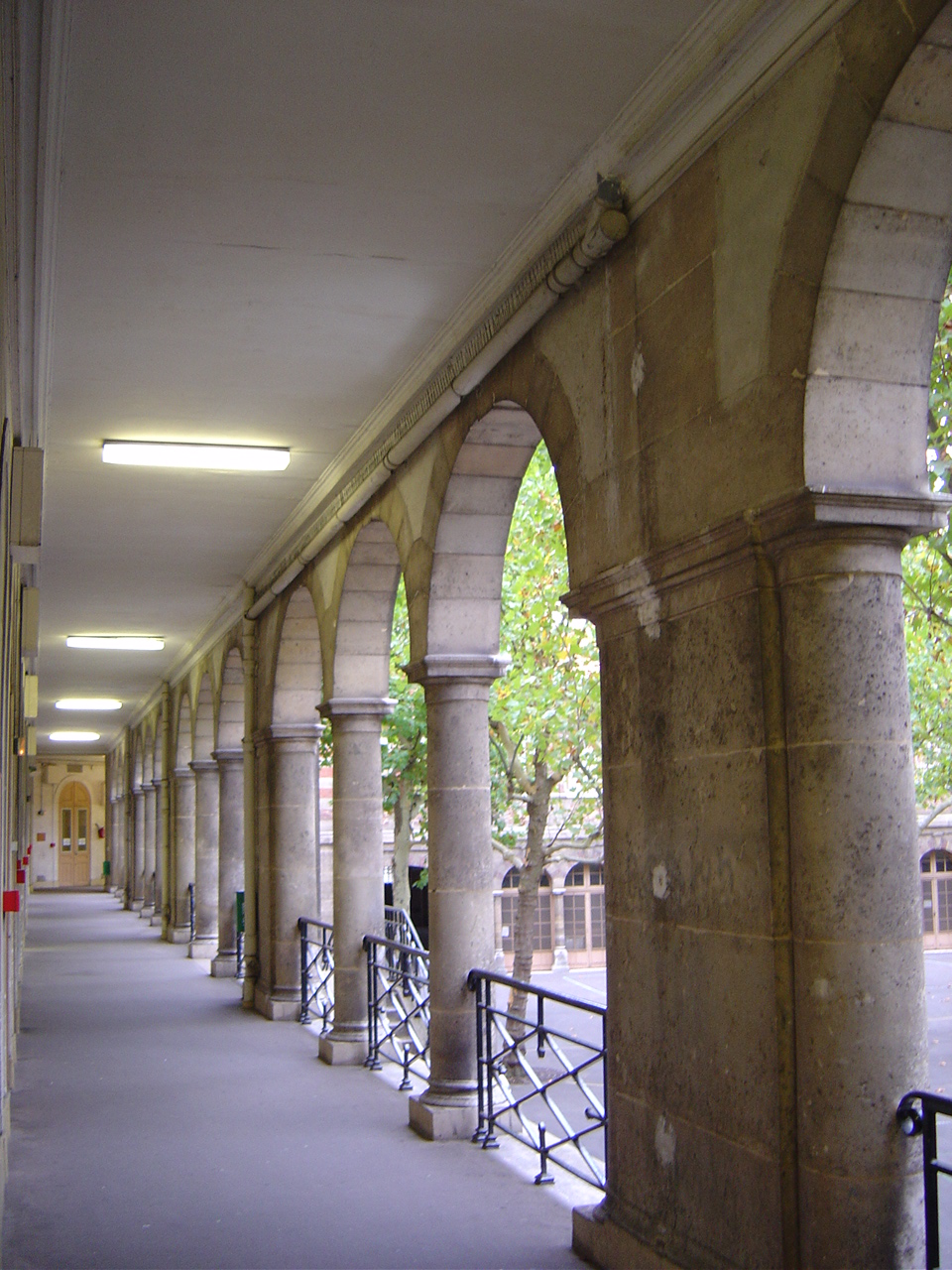
Lesser gallery

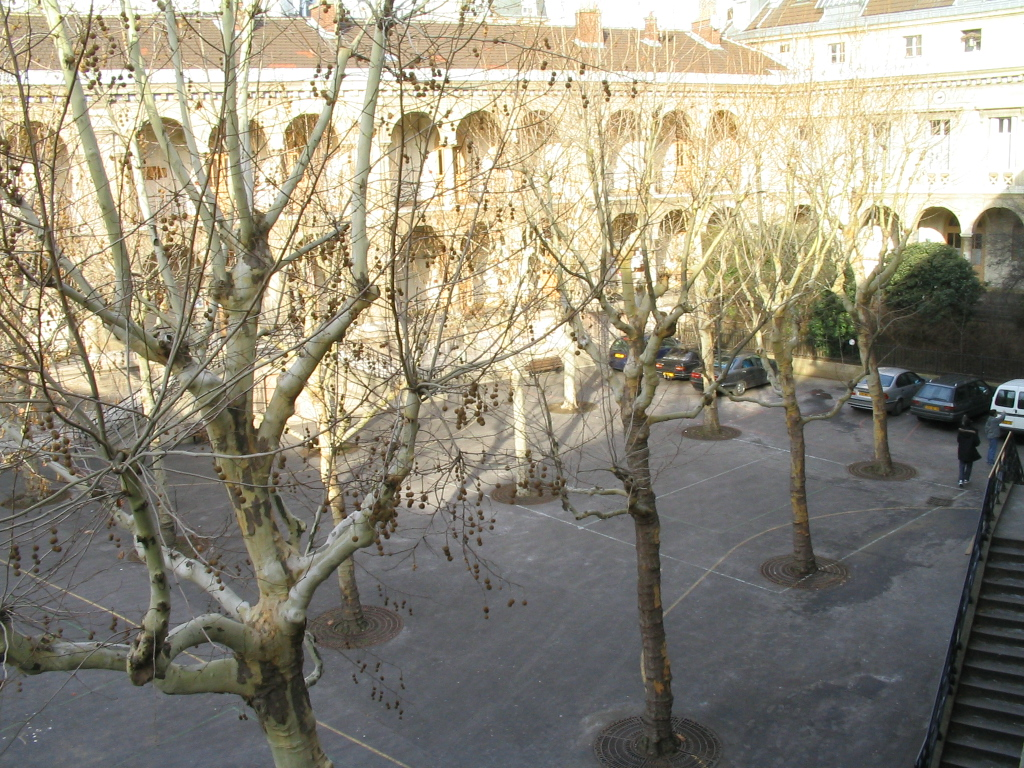
Interior courtyard

Built in 1880, the lycée Arago started as a higher primary school (EPS). Schools of this type were created by François Guizot under the law of 1833 to widen secondary education to those children from poorer families. The EPS in Paris particularly were real colleges. All the disciplines usually associated with the royal colleges were offered, apart from Greek and Latin, which were replaced by foreign languages. Students at the école Arago even received calligraphy classes.

The Parisian EPS were a great success. They prepared students for schools such as the École de physique et chimie de Paris, the École nationale des Arts et Métiers, and the École normale d'instituteurs.

The estimated cost for the école Arago was 1,300,000 gold francs (1877) just for construction. This cost did not include the cost of the land (belonging to the City of Paris), school furniture, physics equipment, chemistry, collections, models, gym equipment, utilities, and other necessary equipment. At this time, it was considered that this work was undeniably useful. Studies lasted from 32 ½ hours in the first year to 48h in the fourth year.

The École Arago contributed to the democratisation of education, allowing students to work in industry and commerce, but also in arts and letters, considered as more noble.

In 1945, EPS Arago became a municipal college: at this time municipal colleges were the equivalent of lycée with all classes between 6th year and final year, plus collège Arago offered preparatory classes for the ENSAM. In 1960, due to the reforms of the 5th Republic, the municipal college of Arago became a lycée, managed by the State.

In this establishment, teachers have included Charles Veillet-Lavallée, Charles Couyba who became a minister and singer (Boukay), Alain Frontier who was a poet and grammarian, Émile Kahn who was President of the Human Rights League (France), Jean-Jacques Becker, historian, First World War expert, etc.

== Secondary education ==
=== Seconds ===
The lycée consists of around 7 classes of general and technology secondary education:

- ISI : Initiation to engineering (30 students)
- ISP : IT and production systems (30 students)
- MPS : Scientific method and practice
- PFEG : Fundamental principles of economics and business (50 students)
- SES : Economic and social sciences (70 students)
- LS : Literature and society (25 students)
- LC : Ancient languages and culture (Latin) (20 students)

=== First ===
There are 7 primary classes with a capacity of 35 students each:

- ES : Social and economic (2 classes)
- S (S.I) : Science + engineering (1 class)
- S (SVT) : Science + life science (2 classes)
- STMG : Science and technology and business management (2 classes)

=== Final year ===
There are 7 classes in the final year with a capacity of 35 students each:

- ES : Social and economic (2 classes)
- S (S.I) : Science + engineering (1 class)
- S (SVT) : Science + life sciences (2 classes)
- STG (Mercatique) : Science and business technology + marketing (1 class)
- STMG (Gestion et finance) : Science and technology of business + business finance (1 class)

=== Classes of brevet de technicien supérieur ===
There is a BTS MUC (Management of commercial units) at the lycée Arago.

=== Lycée ranking ===
In 2015, the lycée ranked 87th out of 10 at départemental level in terms of teaching quality, and 1334th and national level. The ranking is based on three criteria: the bac results, the proportion of students who obtain their baccalauréat having spent two years at the establishment, and added value (calculated based on social origin of the students, their age, and their national diploma results).

== Alumni ==
(Alphabetical list, non exhaustive)

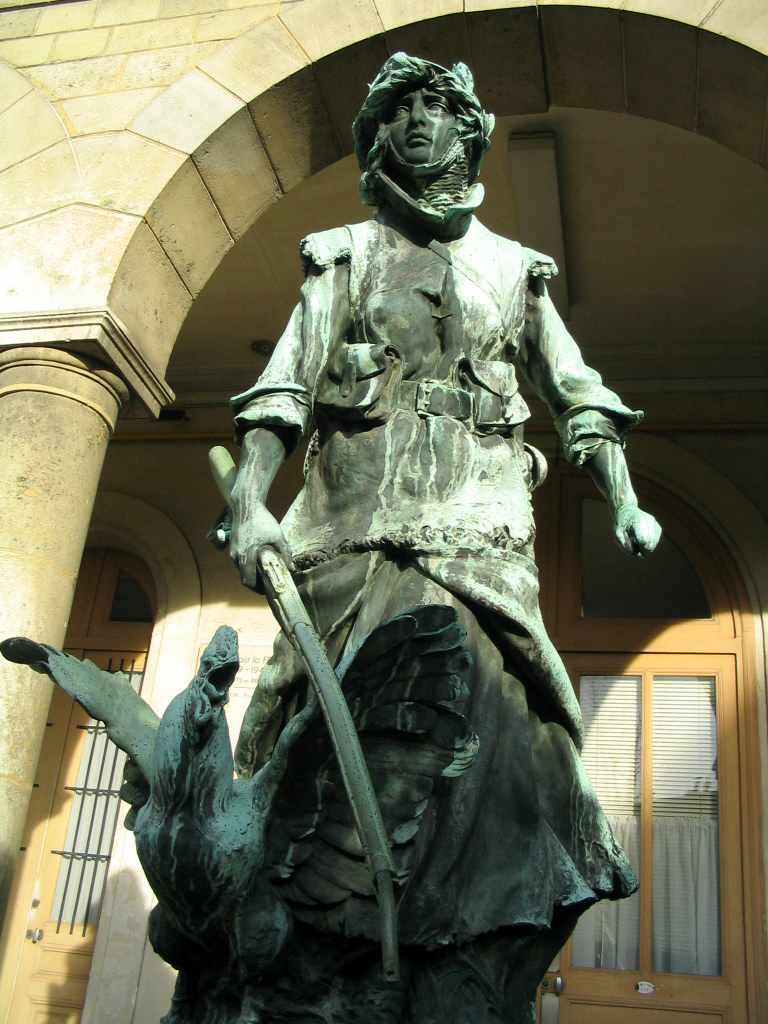
Monument in memory of students who died for France,Le Réveil, behind which is found a list of students who died during the First and Second World Wars, the sculptor, Paul Roussel, is a former student.

- Jean Bellus, illustrator and press cartoonist
- Édouard Bled, grammarian laureate of the Académie française
- Max Clos, codirector of Figaro
- Jean Diwo, founder of Télé 7 jours and journalist for Paris Match
- Tchéky Karyo, actor
- André Leroi-Gourhan, prehistorian and member of the Institut
- Guy Lux, television presenter
- Yves Mirande, playwright
- Charles Picquenard, diplomat
- Paul Roussel (1867–1928), sculptor.
- Raymond Tournon (1870–1919), surveyor, painter, poster artist and illustrator
- Zeev Gourarier (born 1953), museum conservator.

== Lycée Arago alumni association ==
Founded in 1891, the association maintains the traditions of the lycée, including a remembrance service on 11 November.

The object of its activities include:

- maintaining good relationships formed in the establishment
- safeguarding the history and architectural heritage of the lycée

== Access ==
The lycée Arago is accessible via the Metro line 1, 2, 6, and 9 and on RER A via the station Nation (Paris Métro and RER), as well as the Bus (RATP) lines RATP bus routes from 20 to 99#Ligne 26.
