= Maurice Buttin =

French lawyer and writer (1928–2026)

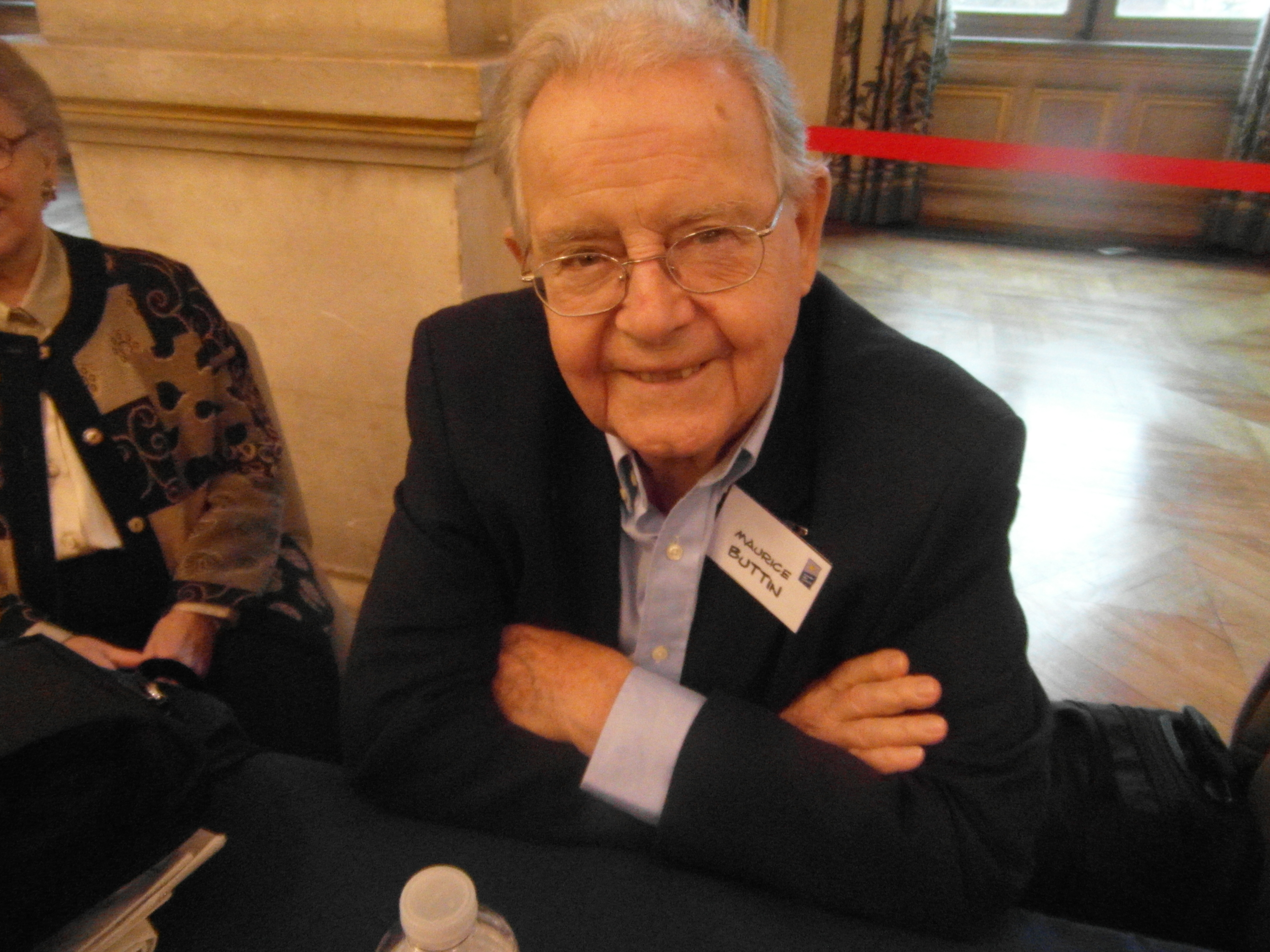
- Buttin in 2016
- Born: 10 December 1928; Meknes, French protectorate in Morocco
- Died: 9 August 2026 (aged 97)
- Occupations: Lawyer; Writer

Maurice Buttin (French: [moʁˈis bytˈɛ̃]; 10 December 1928 – 9 August 2026) was a French lawyer and writer.

== Life and career ==
Born in Meknes on 10 December 1928, Buttin joined the Rabat Bar Association in 1954 and initially defended Moroccan nationalists. He was notably involved with the Mehdi Ben Barka case, who disappeared on 29 October 1965 and harshly criticized the French and Moroccan governments for their involvement. In 2007, over forty years later, he played a key role in announcing international arrest warrants for generals with suspected involvement, but the warrants were never executed. After the establishment of the Equity and Reconciliation Commission, former prisoners proclaimed their knowledge of the whereabouts of Ben Barka's remains. Buttin requested excavations of the alleged sites, but his requests were denied. In addition to his legal career, he served as vice-president of the Association de Solidarité Franco-Arabe and vice-president of the Amitiés franco-irakiennes.

Buttin died on 9 August 2026, at the age of 97.

== Publications ==
- Mehdi Ben Barka en héritage de la tricontinentale à l'altermondialisme (with Leila Shahid, Bachir Ben Barka, Henri Leclerc, and Jean Ziegler, 2007)
- Hassan II - De Gaulle - Ben Barka : Ce que je sais d'eux (2010)
