= Tubiana =

Tubiana is a surname. Notable people with the surname include:

- Laurence Tubiana (born 1951), French economist
- Michel Tubiana (1952–2021), French jurist
