= Women's International War Crimes Tribunal on Japan's Military Sexual Slavery =

2000 mock trial in Japan

The Women's International War Crimes Tribunal on Japan's Military Sexual Slavery was a private People's Tribunal organised by Violence Against Women in War-Network Japan (VAWW-NET Japan). As with the Russell Tribunal in 1967, which was not organized by any government or international institution, the verdict of this trial was not legally binding. Its purpose was to gather testimony from victims, and then to try groups and individuals for rape or sexual slavery, i.e., forcing women to sexually service Japanese soldiers. Yayori Matsui, the representative of VAWW-NET Japan, explained that the reason for holding this trial was to respond to the feelings of victims who continue to lose their cases in civil lawsuits.

The group met on December 8, 2000, and was adjourned on December 12, 2000.

== Charter ==
The Tribunal’s charter states that it is a civil society “people’s tribunal” with jurisdiction over crimes against women committed before and during the Second World War in territories colonized or occupied by Japan. It identifies offences including sexual slavery, rape, enslavement, torture, deportation, persecution, murder, and extermination, and provides for both individual and state responsibility.

The charter sets out a simple procedure: judges and prosecutors appointed by the organizers; public hearings; admissible evidence including documents, survivor and expert testimony, and material evidence; protections for victims and witnesses. It rejects defences of official capacity and superior orders, notes the crimes are not subject to limitation periods, and allows judgments to recommend remedies such as acknowledgment, apology, compensation, disclosure, and education measures.

== Judgement ==
On December 4, 2001, the group's final statement was issued in The Hague. More than 1000 paragraphs and 200 pages long, the judgment discussed the factual findings of the Tribunal, and law applicable to the case. Not all of the accused were convicted, but the late Emperor Showa was, because, as the leader of the country, he was ultimately responsible for the sex-slave policy.

The two last paragraphs of the final judgement read as follows:

The Crimes committed against these survivors remain one of the greatest unacknowledged and unremedied injustices of the Second World War. There are no museums, no graves for the unknown "comfort woman", no education of future generations, and there have been no judgement days for the victims of Japan's military sexual slavery and the rampant sexual violence and brutality that characterized its aggressive war.

Accordingly, through this Judgment, this Tribunal intends to honor all the women victimized by Japan's military sexual slavery system. The Judges recognize the great fortitude and dignity of the survivors who have toiled to survive and reconstruct their shattered lives and who have faced down fear and shame to tell their stories to the world and testify before us. Many of the women who have come forward to fight for justice have died unsung heroes. While the names inscribed in history's page have been, at best, those of the men who commit the crimes or who prosecute them, rather than the women who suffer them, this Judgement bears the names of the survivors who took the stand to tell their stories, and thereby, for four days at least, put wrong on the scaffold and truth on the throne.

The Judgment found individual and superior responsibility for rape and sexual slavery as crimes against humanity, naming Hirohito and senior commanders—Hideki Tojo, Iwane Matsui, Shunroku Hata, Seishiro Itagaki, Rikichi Ando, Seizo Kobayashi, Yoshijiro Umezu, Hisaichi Terauchi, and Tomoyuki Yamashita—and held the Government of Japan responsible; it set out remedies including acknowledgment, apology, compensation, disclosure, and education measures.

The tribunal was broadcast by NHK as part of a documentary on Japan's wartime sexual slavery.

== See also ==
- Comfort women
- Japanese war crimes
- World Courts of Women
- Japanese Devils Japanese documentary on Imperial Japanese atrocities.
- Saburo Ienaga, a Japanese historian who fought government censorship of Imperial Japanese atrocities in World War II after the war.
