= Alimi =

Alimi is a surname. Notable people with the surname include:

- Arié Alimi (born 1977), French lawyer
- Armend Alimi (born 1987), Macedonian footballer
- Bisi Alimi (born 1975), Nigerian activist
- Isnik Alimi (born 1994), Albanian footballer
- Jamiu Alimi (born 1992), Nigerian footballer
- Kazeem Alimi (born 1967), Nigerian politician
- Najwa Alimi, Afghan journalist
- Rashad al-Alimi (born 1954), Yemeni politician
- Sikuru Alimi (born 1942), Nigerian boxer
