= International Tribunal on Crimes against Women =

"people's tribunal" on crimes against women, Brussels 1976

The International Tribunal on Crimes against Women was a people's tribunal which took place on March 4–8, 1976 in Brussels. The event was created with the intention to "make public the full range of crimes, both violently brutal and subtly discriminatory, committed against women of all cultures."

== History ==
Diana E. H. Russell and Nicole Van Den Ven, the main organizers of the tribunal, were inspired by Bertrand Russell's International War Crimes Tribunal, a people's tribunal on crimes committed in the Vietnam War.

== Content ==
The ITCW was attended by over 2000 women from 40 countries, and specific topics include medical and economic crimes, rape, political prisoners, crimes against lesbians, spousal abuse, prostitution, pornography and femicide.

Numerous testimonies were provided in writing by women who were unable to attend the tribunal.

Attendee Frances Doughty noted that the Tribunal confirmed for her that "the oppression of women in general and of lesbians in particular is truly worldwide"

Lesbian poet Pat Parker was among the contributors of testimony, speaking about her eldest sister, who was murdered by her husband.

A Take Back the Night march took place as a candlelight procession in association with the Tribunal.

== Impact ==
Organizers Russell and Van Den Ven published a book based on the Tribunal, Crimes Against Women: Proceedings of the International Tribunal later in 1976.

== See also ==
- World Courts of Women
