= Asia-Japan Women's Resource Center =

Japanese non-governmental organisation

- Founded: December 1994 by Yayori Matsui in Japan
- Type: Non-profit; NGO
- Location: Tokyo, Japan
- Services: Education and Advocacy
- Fields: Women's rights, environment, social justice
- Website: www.ajwrc.org/eng

Asia-Japan Women's Resource Center (AJWRC) is a non-governmental organisation founded in 1994 that advocates gender equality, the end of violence against women, a more just society, and environmentally sustainable development.

AJWRC holds events like empowerment seminars and study groups for women, training and workshops, and they also publish research and conduct outreach campaigns in furtherance of their mission. The activities serve to raise awareness among Japanese women of global as well as domestic issues. Because Japan is a leading nation in the Asian economy and international politics, the organisation feels an obligation to encourage Japanese women to take a leading role in advocacy for improved human rights. Additionally, Japan is the destination for the largest number of cross-border human trafficking victims in Asia, which AJWRC takes as further impetus for their mission.

Disparity between genders has been shrinking in most developed countries over the last century, but AJWRC holds that Japan has lagged behind the trend. As examples, women represent a mere 10% of the National Diet, Japan's legislative body, and women earn just 60% of the salary of their male counterparts in the workforce.

AJWRC grew out of the Asian Women's Association, which was founded in 1977, when gender inequality was even more severe. The founder and It wasn't until 1985 that the Japanese government ratified a Convention on the Elimination of All Forms of Discrimination Against Women, and the country received failing marks as late as 1986 in Humana's World Human Rights Guide regarding the status of women, and is one of the industrialized world's least equal countries in terms of gender gap. Yayori Matsui founded the AJWRC in 1995, which then absorbed the activities of the Asian Women's Association.

The AWA initially focused on protesting the sex trade, but as their influence grew, they expanded their mandate to tackle women's issues more broadly, eventually forming AJWRC as it is today. According to the group's website, they work "to end all forms of violence and discrimination against women, toward democratic Japanese society based on respect for human rights and gender equality, and toward a fair and sustainable global society."

== See also ==
- Women in Japan
- Feminism in Japan
- Women's rights
