= Human Rights League (France) =

Non-governmental organisation

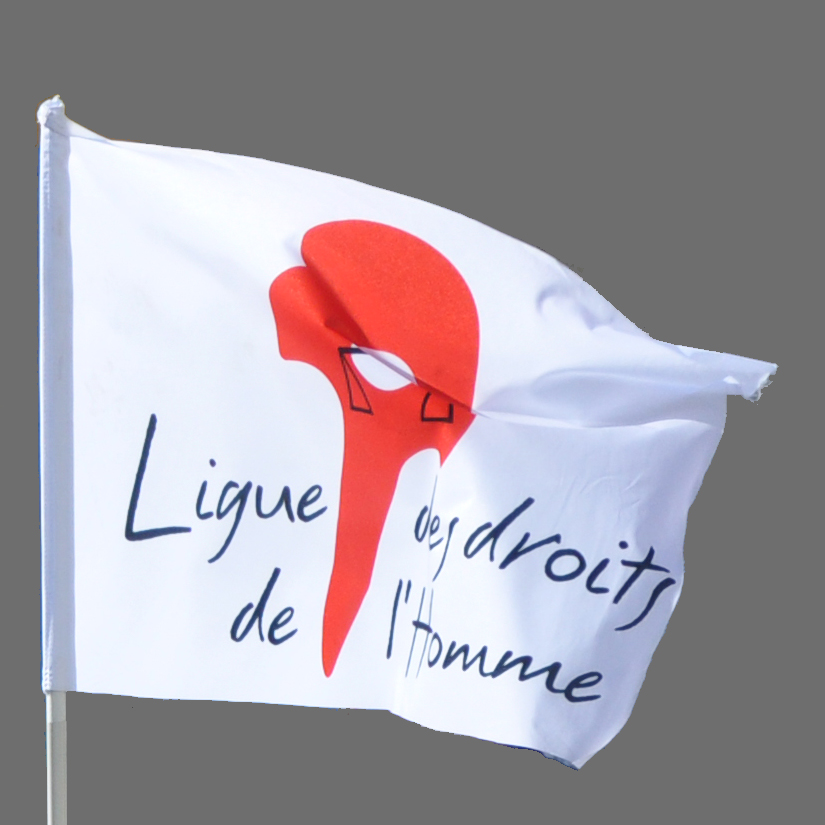
Flag of the Ligue des droits de l'homme

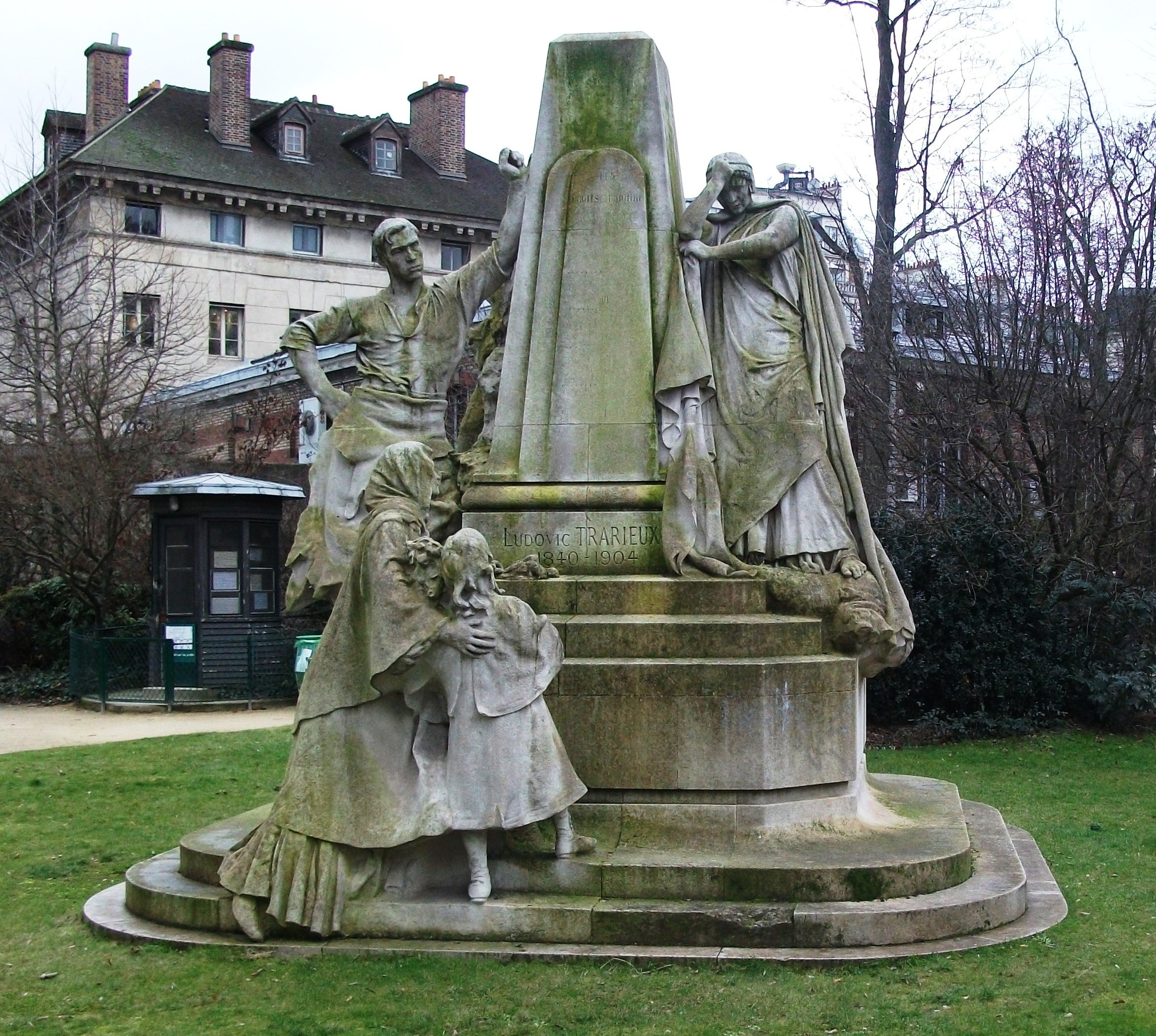
Monument to Ludovic Trarieux in Place Denfert-Rochereau, commemorating the foundation of the Ligue des droits de l'homme (designed by Jean Boucher)

The Human Rights League (French: Ligue des droits de l'homme, LDH), officially the French League for the Defense of Human Rights and Citizen (French: Ligue française pour la défense des droits de l'homme et du citoyen), is a human rights NGO association whose mission includes to observe, defend and promulgate human rights within the French Republic in all spheres of public life. The LDH is a member of the International Federation of Human Rights Leagues (FIDH).

== History ==
=== Early history ===
The League was founded in 1898 by the republican Ludovic Trarieux to defend captain Alfred Dreyfus, a Jew wrongly convicted for treason – this would be known as the Dreyfus Affair.

Dissolved by the Vichy government during World War II, it was clandestinely reconstituted in 1943 by a central committee including Pierre Cot, René Cassin and Félix Gouin. The LDH was refounded after the Liberation. Paul Langevin, who had recently joined the French Communist Party (PCF), became its president. Opposed to the Algerian War and the massive use of torture by the French Army, the LDH called for demonstrations against the 1961 Algiers putsch.

=== Modern ===
In February 2005, the LDH accused the government of historic revisionism for implementing a law requiring high schools to teach about the positive effects of colonialism. The law was repealed at the start of the following year.

The LDH has provided support to the Groupe d'Information sur les Prisons (GIP), a prisoners' rights group co-founded by Michel Foucault in 1971, and worked with prominent activists like Cesare Battisti and Ira Einhorn. The LDH has also opposed itself to Nicolas Sarkozy's policies, which it deems "repressive". In its 2003 report, it declared that "since the Algerian War we had never seen such a strong rollback of human rights in France".

== Cultural references ==
- In his 1970 autobiographical book Papillon, Henri Charriere angrily laments the lack of interest shown in the treatment of prisoners sent to the penal colonies of French Guiana, citing LDH in particular:

I trampled the organisation of the Ligue des Droits de l'Homme et du Citoyen that never spoke out and said, "stop killing people as surely as if they were guillotined: abolish the mass sadism among the employees of the prison service." I trampled the fact that not a single organisation or association ever questioned the top men of this system to find out how and why eighty per cent of the people who were sent away every two years vanished.

== List of presidents ==
- Ludovic Trarieux (1898–1903)
- Francis de Pressensé (1903–1914)
- Ferdinand Buisson (1914–1926, Nobel Peace Prize in 1927, along with the German Ludwig Quidde)
- Victor Basch (1926–1944)
- Paul Langevin (1944–1946)
- Sicard de Plauzoles (1946–1953)
- Émile Kahn (1953–1958)
- Daniel Mayer (1958–1975)
- Henri Noguères (1975–1984)
- Yves Jouffa (1984–1991)
- Madeleine Rebérioux (1991–1995)
- Henri Leclerc (1995–2000)
- Michel Tubiana (2000–2005)
- Jean-Pierre Dubois (2005–2011)
- Pierre Tartakowsky (2011–2015)
- Françoise Dumont (2015–2017)
- Malik Salemkour (2017–2022)
- Patrick Baudouin (since 2022)

== See also ==
- Arié Alimi (1977–present)
- Caroline Rémy de Guebhard (1855–1929)
