= Jean-Pierre Dubois =

French lawyer and leftist activist (born 1952)

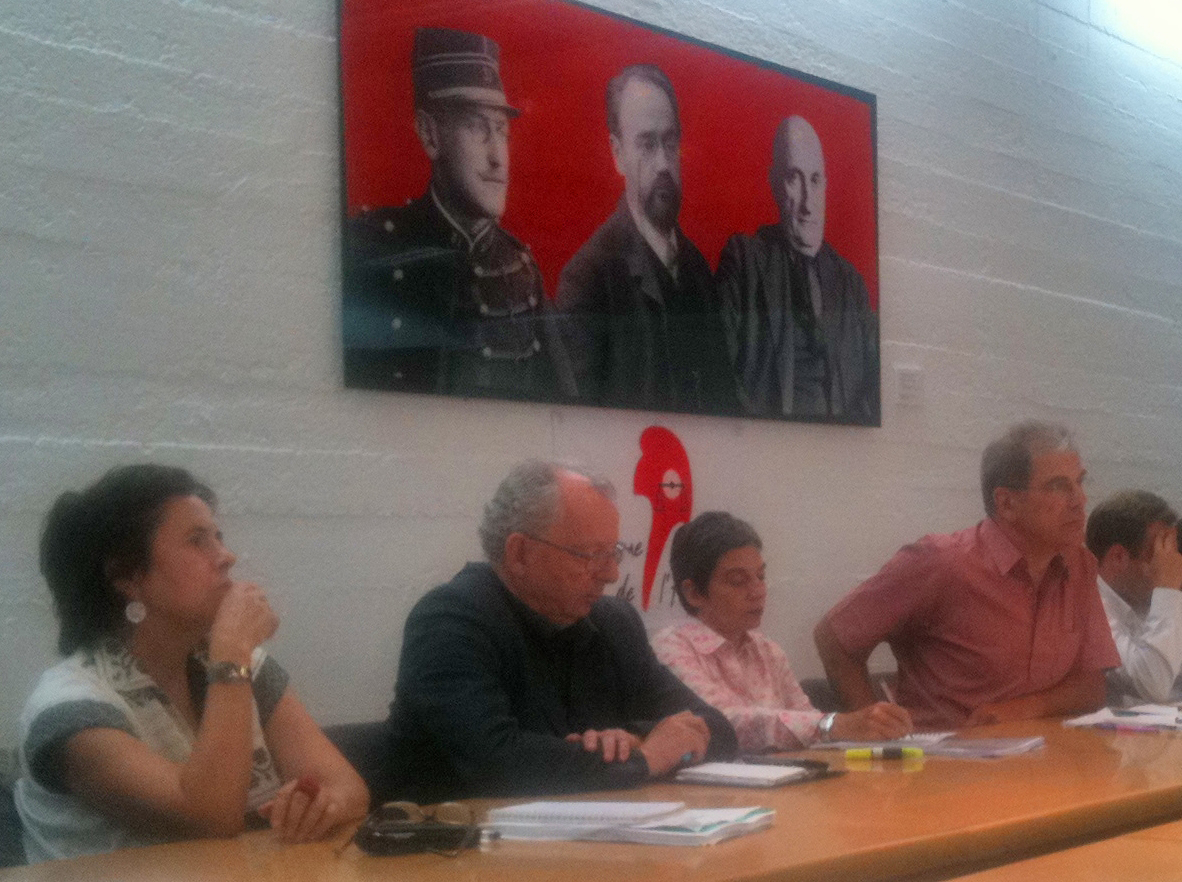
- Jean-Pierre Dubois (on the right)

Member of League of Human Rights - France

Personal details
- Born: May 15, 1952 (age 73)
- Spouse: Marie-Christine Vergiat
- Occupation: Lawyer
- Profession: Human right activist Politician

Jean-Pierre Dubois (born May 15, 1952) is a French lawyer and leftist activist. He was president of the Human Rights League (France) (LDH) (June 2005 – June 2011). He has been Honorary President of the league since June 2011.

== Career ==
He has been professor of public law at the University of Paris XI since September 1999.

He joined the Saint-Denis office of LDH in 1986, where he still continues.

In 2005, he began his 4th term in the central committee of the LDH and his 8th term as a member of the national office where he was previously vice president. Since March 2001, he has been deputy secretary general of the International Federation for Human Rights (FIDH). In June, he was elected president of the LDH.

His subjects of interest are secularism and globalization. He was, on various occasions, assigned to these subjects by the LDH or FIDH and participated in several global and European social forums, in particular in Nicosia. He married Marie-Christine Vergiat. They have a daughter, named Fraise.

== See also ==
- Human Rights League (France)
