= World Tribunal on Iraq =

People's court

The World Tribunal on Iraq (WTI) was a people's court consisting of intellectuals, human rights campaigners and non-governmental organizations, and was active from 2003 to 2005. Set up following the 2003 invasion of Iraq it sprung from the anti-war movement and is modelled on the Russell Tribunal of the American movement against the Vietnam War.

== Actions ==
- Brussels, April 14–17, 2004 - the Brussels Tribunal hearings focused on the programs and policies of the Project for the New American Century (PNAC), its role in the war against Iraq, and the role of the war against Iraq as part of the PNAC's program of military domination of the Earth

== Publications ==
The most complete collection of the proceedings of the Tribunal has been collected in Sökmen, M. G. Roy, A., Falk, R. (eds.) 2008. World Tribunal on Iraq: Making the Case Against War. Northampton, MA: Olive Branch Press.

See also: Borowiak, C. 2008. 'The World Tribunal on Iraq: Citizens’ Tribunals and the Struggle for Accountability'. New Political Science, 30:161-186. Cubukcu, A. 2011. ‘On Cosmopolitan Occupations. The Case of the World Tribunal on Iraq’, Interventions. International Journal of Postcolonial Studies, 13:422-442.

J. Gerson and D. Snauwaert. 2021. Reclaimative Post-Conflict Justice: Democratizing Justice in the World Tribunal on Iraq. Cambridge Scholars Publishing.

== See also ==
- The UN Security Council and the Iraq war
- Protests against the 2003 Iraq war
- Governments' pre-war positions on invasion of Iraq
- The Gaza Tribunal
