= Jean-Marc Théolleyre =

French journalist

- Born: 31 July 1924; Lyon
- Died: 27 December 2001 (aged 77); Noisy-le-Grand
- Occupation: Journalist

Jean-Marc Théolleyre (31 July 1924 – 12 June 2001) was a 20th-century French journalist.

== Biography ==
- 1943: Resistant in Lyon and then in Toulouse, he was arrested and deported to Buchenwald for nearly two years and was released in 1945.
- November 1945: joined Le Monde as reporter. Professional card #6312.
- 1950-1957: Judicial Chronicler in Le Monde. During this period he followed some of the great post-war trials like that of Amélie Rabilloud, Marie Besnard, Oradour-sur-Glane, the Dominici affair, and Jacques Fesch.
- April 1957 – November 1957: Senior reporter for Le Figaro littéraire.
- November 1957: Senior reporter for Paris-Journal.
- 1959: Retuened to Le Monde, a chief reporter and a judicial columnist. He covered trials linkes to the Algerian war as well as the réseau Jeanson, general Salan, the Semaine des barricades, and attentat du Petit-Clamart.
- 1970-75: Permanent envoy for the Rhône-Alpes region.
- From 1975: Literary critic and senior reporter in charge of the judicial chronicle.
- 1967: Vice-President of the Association of the Judicial Press.
- In 1987, he covered for Le Monde the trial in Lyon of Klaus Barbie.

== Distinctions ==
- Prix Albert Londres (1959)
- Prix Louis Hachette for the print media (1988) for his paper "Klaus Barbie: nothing to say" (Klaus Barbie: rien à dire) (Le Monde).

== Judicial conviction for defamation ==
Jean-Marc Théolleyre was convicted in 1983 by the Paris Court of Appeal for defamation, having suggested in his book Les néo-nazis (ed. Messidor, 1982) that "Jean-Marie Le Pen professed neo-Nazi opinions". The Court's judgment, inter alia, stated that "he did not exercise the caution, reserve and objectivity required by amalgamating or insinuating" (Paris Court of Appeal, 15 June 1983).

== Bibliography ==
- 1956: Le Procès des fuites
- 1966: Ces Procès qui ébranlèrent la France
- 1977: Tout condamné à mort aura la tête tranchée
- 1982: Les néo-nazis
- 1991: L'accusée: 45 ans de justice en France, 1945-1990
- 1998: Les médias et la justice (with Henri Leclerc)
