= Michel Tubiana =

French jurist and lawyer (1952–2021)

- Born: 24 November 1952; Algiers, French Algeria
- Died: 2 October 2021 (aged 68); Neuilly-sur-Seine, France
- Occupations: Jurist; Lawyer

Michel Tubiana (24 November 1952 – 2 October 2021) was a French jurist and lawyer. He served as President of the Human Rights League of France from 2000 to 2005.

== Biography ==
Born in Algiers in 1952, Tubiana's family moved to Paris in 1962. His father was a judge with the tribunal de commerce and his mother raised him and his two brothers. In 1967, he became a militant of the Jeunesse communiste révolutionnaire, a Trotskyist youth organization. In 1972, as a law student, he became involved with Freemasonry, the Fédération du Droit Humain, and the Grand Orient de France. He protested the assassination of Salvador Allende in 1973.

In 1974, Tubiana officially became a lawyer. He defended Klaus Croissant, lawyer of the Red Army Faction, and was involved in the trial of Maurice Papon, although he was primarily a corporate lawyer. On 12 June 2000, he succeeded Henri Leclerc as President of the Human Rights League. He stayed in office until 12 June 2005.

On 27 January 2014, Le Monde alleged that Tubiana and others were guilty of tax evasion in Switzerland with HSBC Private Bank as part of Swiss Leaks. Notably, he opposed the extradition of far-left Italian terrorist Cesare Battisti.

Michel Tubiana died on 2 October 2021 at the age of 68.
