= Russell Tribunal =

People's tribunal formed in 1966 by Bertrand Russell

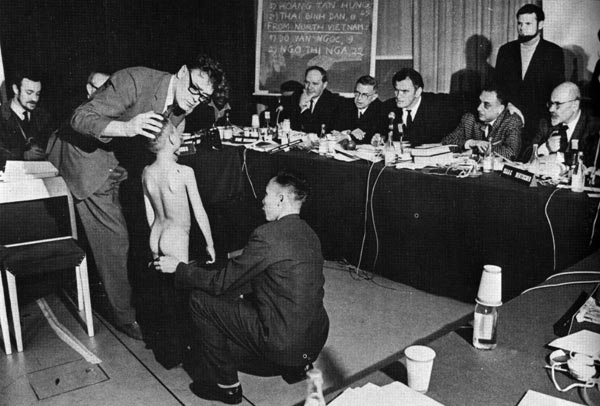
Nine-year-old Do Van Ngoc exhibits injuries from napalm in Vietnam.

The Russell Tribunal, also known as the International War Crimes Tribunal, Russell–Sartre Tribunal, or Stockholm Tribunal, was a private people's tribunal organised in 1966 by Bertrand Russell, British philosopher and Nobel Prize winner, and hosted by French philosopher and writer Jean-Paul Sartre, along with Lelio Basso, Simone de Beauvoir, Vladimir Dedijer, Ralph Schoenman, Isaac Deutscher, Günther Anders, Lázaro Cárdenas and several others. The tribunal investigated and evaluated American foreign policy and military intervention in Vietnam.

Bertrand Russell justified the establishment of this body as follows:

If certain acts and violations of treaties are crimes, they are crimes whether the United States does them or whether Germany does them. We are not prepared to lay down a rule of criminal conduct against others which we would not be willing to have invoked against us.

— Justice Robert H. Jackson, Chief Prosecutor, Nuremberg War Crimes Trials

The tribunal was constituted in November 1966, and was conducted in two sessions in 1967, in Stockholm, Sweden and Roskilde, Denmark. Bertrand Russell's book on the armed confrontations underway in Vietnam, War Crimes in Vietnam, was published in January 1967. His postscript called for establishing this investigative body. The findings of the tribunal were largely ignored in the United States.

Further tribunals were also held on various other issues, including psychiatry, human rights, and the Israel–Palestine conflict and, most recently, on the disputed territory of Jammu and Kashmir.

== Composition and origin ==
The idea for the tribunal was first proposed to Russell in 1965 by M.S. Arnoni. Representatives of 18 countries participated in the tribunal's two sessions. The tribunal committee, which called itself the International War Crimes Tribunal, consisted of 25 notable individuals, predominantly from peace organisations, including winners of the Nobel Prize, Medals of Valor, and awards of recognition in humanitarian and social fields. Neither Vietnam nor the United States was directly represented by any individual on the 25-member panel, although a couple of members were American citizens.

More than 30 people, including military personnel from the United States, and both of the warring factions in Vietnam, gave evidence to the tribunal. Financing for the Tribunal included a large contribution from the North Vietnamese government after a request made by Russell to Ho Chi Minh.

== Tribunal members ==
- Wolfgang Abendroth, JD, Professor of Political Science, Marburg University (did not attend the sessions in Stockholm and Roskilde)
- Tariq Ali, journalist and political campaigner
- Günther Anders, writer and philosopher
- Mehmet Ali Aybar, international lawyer; Member of Turkish Parliament; President, Workers' Party of Turkey
- A. J. Ayer, British philosopher and logician
- James Baldwin, African-American novelist and essayist (did not attend the sessions in Stockholm and Roskilde)
- Lelio Basso, international lawyer; Deputy of Italian Parliament and Member of the Commission of Foreign Affairs; professor, Rome University. President of PSIUP (Italian Socialist Party of Proletarian Unity)
- Lázaro Cárdenas, former President of Mexico
- Stokely Carmichael, American civil rights activist, Chairman, Student Nonviolent Coordinating Committee
- Courtland Cox, American civil rights activist, Student Nonviolent Coordinating Committee
- Lawrence Daly, General Secretary, Scottish National Union of Mineworkers
- Simone de Beauvoir, French writer and philosopher
- Vladimir Dedijer, MA, JD, Tribunal chairman and President of Sessions, historian and former Yugoslav Partisan fighter
- David Dellinger, American pacifist; Editor, Liberation; Chairman, Fifth Avenue Parade Committee
- Isaac Deutscher, Polish-British historian and Trotsky biographer
- Miguel Ángel Estrella, ambassador to UNESCO
- Haika Grossman, Israeli liberation fighter, jurist (did not attend the sessions in Stockholm and Roskilde)
- Gisèle Halimi, French lawyer; attorney for Djamila Bouhired; author of works on French repression of independence fighters in Algeria
- Amado V. Hernandez, poet laureate of the Philippines; Chairman, Democratic Labor Party; Acting President, National Organization of Philippine Writers
- Melba Hernandez, Chairman, Cuban Committee for Solidarity with Viet Nam, now the Cuba-Viet Nam Friendship Association
- Mahmud Ali Kasuri, Member of the National Assembly of Pakistan, Senior Advocate Supreme Court of Pakistan
- Sara Lidman, Swedish novelist and activist (substitute for Wolfgang Abendroth at the Stockholm and Roskilde sessions)
- Kinju Morikawa, attorney; Vice-Chairman, Japan Civil Liberties Union
- Carl Oglesby, Past President, Students for a Democratic Society; playwright; political essayist
- Bertrand Russell (Tribunal Honorary President), peace activist; philosopher; mathematician
- Shoichi Sakata, Japanese physicist, educator
- Jean-Paul Sartre (Tribunal Executive President), philosopher; writer, playwright, political activist
- Laurent Schwartz, Professor of Mathematics, Paris University.
- Alice Walker, American author and activist
- Peter Weiss, German playwright, novelist; experimental film director

Other intellectuals were invited but eventually rejected this invitation for various reasons:

- Noam Chomsky, American anti-war activist.

== Aims ==
The Tribunal aims were stated as follows:

We constitute ourselves a Tribunal which, even if it has not the power to impose sanctions, will have to answer, amongst others, the following questions:

1. Has the United States Government (and the Governments of Australia, New Zealand and South Korea) committed acts of aggression according to international law?
2. Has the American army made use of or experimented with new weapons or weapons forbidden by the laws of war?
3. Has there been bombardment of targets of a purely civilian character, for example hospitals, schools, sanatoria, dams, etc., and on what scale has this occurred?
4. Have Vietnamese prisoners been subjected to inhuman treatment forbidden by the laws of war and, in particular, to torture or mutilation? Have there been unjustified reprisals against the civilian population, in particular, execution of hostages?
5. Have forced labour camps been created, has there been deportation of the population or other acts tending to the extermination of the population and which can be characterised juridically as acts of genocide?

All participants in the war in Southeast Asia are petitioned to attend and present evidence, including Vietnam, Cambodia and the United States, as noted in this excerpt from the Tribunal's description of aims and intent:

"This Tribunal will examine all the evidence that may be placed before it by any source or party. The evidence may be oral, or in the form of documents. No evidence relevant to our purposes will be refused attention. ... The National Liberation Front of South Vietnam and the Government of the Democratic Republic of Vietnam have assured us of their willingness to co-operate ... The Cambodian Head of State, Prince Sihanouk, has similarly offered to help ... We invite the Government of the United States to present evidence or cause it to be presented ... Our purpose is to establish, without fear or favour, the full truth about this war. We sincerely hope that our efforts will contribute to the world's justice, to the re-establishment of peace and the liberation of oppressed peoples."

== Evidence presented at the Tribunal ==
During the First Tribunal Session in Stockholm, testimony and evidence was produced by the following witnesses (incomplete list):

- Gabriel Kolko, American historian
- Jean Chesneaux, French historian
- Charles Fourniau, French historian, journalist and playwright
- Leon Matarasso, French jurist
- Samuel Rosenwein, American constitutional lawyer
- Abraham Behar, French M.D.
- John Takman, Swedish M.D. and parliamentarian
- Axel Höjer, Swedish M.D. and UN official
- Marta Rojas, Cuban author and revolutionary
- Alejo Carpentier, Cuban author
- Charles Cobb, American journalist and field secretary of the SNCC
- Julius Lester, American author and civil rights activist
- Fujio Yamazaki, Japanese scientist, Professor of Agriculture
- Makato Kandachi, Japanese scientist
- Joe Neilands, American scientist
- Malcolm Caldwell, British journalist and academic
- Do Van Ngoc, 9-year-old Vietnamese napalm bombing survivor
- Ngo Thi Nga, Vietnamese teacher
- Martin Birnstingl, British surgeon

During the Second Tribunal Session in Roskilde, testimony and evidence was produced by the following witnesses (incomplete list):

- Peter Martinsen, American veteran, 541st Military Intelligence Detachment
- Donald Duncan, American veteran, Army Special Forces
- David Kenneth Tuck, American veteran, 25th Infantry Division
- Wilfred Burchett, Australian journalist
- Erich Wulff, German M.D.
- Masahiro Hashimoto, Japanese M.D.
- Gilbert Dreyfus, French M.D., Professor of Biochemistry
- Alexandre Minkowski, M.D., Professor of Pediatrics
- Madelaine Riffaud, French journalist
- Roger Pic, French photo journalist
- Pham Thi Yen, Vietnamese pharmacist, former political prisoner
- Thai Binh Danh, Vietnamese farmworker, napalm bombing survivor
- Edgar Ledeer, French scientist
- Stanley Faulkner, American civil rights attorney
- Yves Jouffa, French jurist and activist

== Conclusions and verdicts ==
The Tribunal stated that its conclusions were:

1. Has the Government of the United States committed acts of aggression against Vietnam under the terms of international law?
  Yes (unanimously).
2. Has there been, and if so, on what scale, bombardment of purely civilian targets, for example, hospitals, schools, medical establishments, dams, etc?
  Yes (unanimously).
  We find the government and armed forces of the United States are guilty of the deliberate, systematic and large-scale bombardment of civilian targets, including civilian populations, dwellings, villages, dams, dikes, medical establishments, leper colonies, schools, churches, pagodas, historical and cultural monuments. We also find unanimously, with one abstention, that the government of the United States of America is guilty of repeated violations of the sovereignty, neutrality and territorial integrity of Cambodia, that it is guilty of attacks against the civilian population of a certain number of Cambodian towns and villages.
3. Have the governments of Australia, New Zealand and South Korea been accomplices of the United States in the aggression against Vietnam in violation of international law?
  Yes (unanimously).
  The question also arises as to whether or not the governments of Thailand and other countries have become accomplices to acts of aggression or other crimes against Vietnam and its populations. We have not been able to study this question during the present session. We intend to examine at the next session legal aspects of the problem and to seek proofs of any incriminating facts.
4. Is the Government of Thailand guilty of complicity in the aggression committed by the United States Government against Vietnam?
  Yes (unanimously).
5. Is the Government of the Philippines guilty of complicity in the aggression committed by the United States Government against Vietnam?
  Yes (unanimously).
6. Is the Government of Japan guilty of complicity in the aggression committed by the United States Government against Vietnam?
  Yes, (by 8 Votes to 3).
  The three Tribunal members who voted against agree that the Japanese Government gives considerable aid to the Government of the United States, but do not agree on its complicity in the crime of aggression.
7. Has the United States Government committed aggression against the people of Laos, according to the definition provided by international law?
  Yes (unanimously).
8. Have the armed forces of the United States used or experimented with weapons prohibited by the laws of war?
  Yes (unanimously).
9. Have prisoners of war captured by the armed forces of the United States been subjected to treatment prohibited by the laws of war?
  Yes (unanimously).
10. Have the armed forces of the United States subjected the civilian population to inhuman treatment prohibited by international law?
  Yes (unanimously).
11. Is the United States Government guilty of genocide against the people of Vietnam?
  Yes (unanimously).

Prompted in part by the My Lai Massacre, in 1969 the Bertrand Russell Peace Foundation organised Citizens Commissions of Inquiry (CCI) to hold hearings intended to document testimony of war crimes in Indochina. These hearings were held in several American cities, and would eventually form the foundation of two national investigations: the National Veterans Inquiry sponsored by the CCI, and the Winter Soldier Investigation sponsored by the Vietnam Veterans Against the War.

== Reasoning for verdicts ==
=== Verdict 11: Genocide ===
In 1968, John Gerassi, who was an investigator for the Tribunal, documented alleged war crimes, including the bombing hospitals, schools and other civilian targets in Vietnam. In his book he states that the larger motivation for the Tribunal on the accusation of genocide was more about exposing American atrocities against civilians than an actual ongoing genocide.

Jean-Paul Sartre bases his argument for genocide on several reasons, but part of it rests on statements and declarations from US leaders and intention rather than conduct. "In particular, we must try to understand whether there is an intention of genocide in the war that the American government is fighting against Vietnam. Article 2 of the Convention of 1948 defines genocide on the basis of intention." And that "Recently, Dean Rusk has declared: 'We are defending ourselves ... It is the United States that is in danger in Saigon. This means that their first aim is military: it is to encircle Communist China, the major obstacle to their expansionism. Thus, they will not let south-east Asia escape. America has put men in power in Thailand, it controls part of Laos and threatens to invade Cambodia. But these conquests will be useless if the US has to face a free Vietnam with thirty-one million united people." Furthermore that "At this point in our discussion, three facts emerge: (1) the US government wants a base and an example; (2) this can be achieved, without any greater obstacle than the resistance of the Vietnamese people themselves, by liquidating an entire people and establishing a Pax Americana on a Vietnamese desert; (3) to attain the second, the US must achieve, at least partially, this extermination."

== Subsequent tribunals ==
Additional tribunals using the same model and the denomination Russell Tribunal have been held. The Second Russell Tribunal on Latin America was held over three sessions that spanned three years and focused on human rights violations during the military dictatorships in Argentina and Brazil (Rome, 1974) and on Chile's military coup d'état (Rome, 1974–76). The third tribunal focused on the situation of Human Rights in Germany (1978). The fourth tribunal focused on the rights of the Indians of the Americas (Rotterdam 1980). Subsequent tribunals focused on the Threat of Indigenous Peoples of America (1982), on Human Rights in Psychiatry (Berlin, 2001), on Iraq (Brussels, 2004), and on Palestine (Barcelona, 2009–12).

At the closing session of the Russell Tribunal the creation of three new institutions was announced: the International Foundation for the Rights and Liberations of Peoples, and the International League for the Rights and Liberations of Peoples, and the Permanent Peoples' Tribunal.

The Permanents People's Tribunal was established in Bologna on 23 June 1979. Between its founding and April 1984, the tribunal pronounced two advisory opinions on Western Sahara and Eritrea and held eight sessions (Argentina, Philippines, El Salvador, Afghanistan I and II, East Timor, Zaire and Guatemala). The latter was concluded in January 1983 in Madrid.

A special hearing was conducted in Paris on 13–16 April 1984 to investigate the Armenian genocide. The Tribunal's 35-member panel included three Nobel Prize winners—Seán MacBride, Adolfo Pérez Esquivel and Professor George Wald— and ten eminent jurist, theologians, academics and political figures. The tribunal concluded that genocide was already prohibited by law at the time the Armenian Genocide took place - that though not explicitly banned by written rules it was not legally tolerated - thus the 1948 International Convention for the Prevention and Punishment of the Crime of Genocide was formally expressing an already existing prohibition. The tribunal concluded that the massacres of Armenians between 1915 and 1917 revealed the intention of the systematic extermination of the Armenian people, intent as specified in article II of the 1948 convention, and that it was undoubtedly a genocide, the manifestation of a policy that had emerged in the Ottoman Empire in the 1890s. The tribunal criticised as unacceptable the denial (il diniego abusive "the abusive refusal") of the genocide by Turkish governments since the establishment of the Kemalist republic.

More than three decades later, the Russell Tribunal model was followed by the World Tribunal on Iraq, which was held to make a similar analysis of the Project for the New American Century, the 2003 Invasion of Iraq and subsequent occupation of Iraq, and the links between these.

=== 1974–76: On Repression in Brazil, Chile, and Latin America (Rome, Brussels) ===
After Russell's death in 1970, Senator Lelio Basso began organizing a second tribunal in 1973 initially focused on human rights violations in Brazil, which then expanded to include Chile in the wake of the military coup in that country, and then to all of Latin America. The official name chosen by the constituents was "Russel Tribunal II on the Repression in Brazil, Chile and in Latin America" and was held in three sessions from 1974 to 1976 in Rome and Brussels. Basso presided over the tribunal and writer Gabriel García Márquez, historians Vladimir Dedijer and Albert Soboul, and professor of law François Rigaux served as vice-presidents.

=== 2001: On Human Rights in Psychiatry (Berlin) ===
In 2001, Thomas Szasz and others took part in a Russell Tribunal on Human Rights in Psychiatry held in Berlin between 30 June and 2 July. The Tribunal brought in the two following verdicts: the majority verdict claimed that there was "serious abuse of human rights in psychiatry" and that psychiatry was "guilty of the combination of force and unaccountability"; the minority verdict, signed by the Israeli Law Professor Alon Harel and Brazilian novelist Paulo Coelho, called for "public critical examination of the role of psychiatry."

=== 2004: On Iraq (Brussels) ===
In 2004 the "BRussells Tribunal" took place in Brussels as a continuation of the tradition of the Russell Tribunal as part of the World Tribunal on Iraq. Philosopher Jacques Derrida praised this event, stating that "to resuscitate the tradition of a Russell Tribunal is symbolically an important and necessary thing to do today."

=== 2009–2014: On Palestine (Barcelona, London, Cape Town, New York, Brussels) ===
The Russell Tribunal on Palestine (RToP) was created in March 2009.

In April 2011, the association converted to a non-profit organisation, with legal status in Brussels, by Pierre Galand, Jacques Michiels, Jacques Debatty, Nadia Farkh, Henri Eisendrath and Roseline Sonet. The former non-elected PS senator, Galand, was appointed president of the association.

The first session of the Tribunal took place in Barcelona in March 2010. This session's objective was to consider the complicities and omissions of the European Union and its member states in the Palestinian-Israel conflict. The second international session of the RToP took place in London in November 2010. It examined international corporate issues in Israel and human rights law.

The third international session of the RToP took place in Cape Town in November 2011. It asked the question: "Are Israeli practices against the Palestinian people in breach of the prohibition on apartheid under international law?"

Pierre Galand pointed out that the Cape Town session of the tribunal had a budget of €190,000; €100,000 was donated by Editions Indigene, the publisher of the book Time for an outrage. More than €15,000 was raised at a 24 September 2011 fundraising event by the Belgian support committee of the Russell Tribunal. The Caipirinha Foundation lists the RToP as a grant receiver, but does not disclose the amount or the year of its grant.

A fourth international session of the RToP took place in New York on 6–7 October 2012.

A fifth session met in Brussels on 16–17 March 2013.

An extraordinary session was held in Brussels on 24 September 2014 in response to Israel's Operation Protective Edge launched in the Gaza Strip on 8 July 2014.

=== 2021: On Kashmir (Sarajevo, Bosnia-Herzegovina) ===
The Russell Tribunal on Kashmir was launched in Sarajevo, Bosnia-Hercegovina, and took place on 17–19 December 2021. It was organized by Canadian NGO Kashmir Civitas whose Secretary-General is Canadian academic Farhan Mujahid Chak, and attended by Richard Falk, Sami al-Arian, Jonathan A.C. Brown, David Hearst, and Omar Suleiman. The event had support/partnerships with the World Kashmir Awareness Forum, Bertrand Russell Peace Foundation, Permanent Peoples' Tribunal, Aljazeera Balkans, Nahla, Center for Advanced Studies in Sarajevo, and International University of Sarajevo.

Decolonization, settler-colonialism, crimes against humanity, genocide and nuclear threats emerging from the disputed territory of Indian-Occupied Jammu and Kashmir were marked at an inaugural tribunal in Sarajevo that sought to draw global attention to the atrocities committed in the Muslim-majority region.

== Criticisms ==
The tribunal did not investigate alleged war crimes by the Viet Cong; Ralph Schoenman commented: "Lord Russell would think no more of doing that than of trying the Jews of the Warsaw Ghetto for their uprising against the Nazis."

The Russell Tribunal was included by historian Guenter Lewy as part of a "veritable industry publicizing alleged war crimes", as increasing numbers of American servicemen were stepping forward with published accounts of their experiences with atrocities, and scholars and peace organisations were holding tribunals dealing with war crimes.

Staughton Lynd, chairman of the 1965 "March on Washington", was asked by Russell to participate in the tribunal and rejected the invitation. Lynd's objections and criticism of the Tribunal were based on the fact that Russell planned to investigate only non-North Vietnamese and National Liberation Front conduct. Lynd wrote that "in conversation with the emissary who proffered the invitation, I urged that the alleged war crimes of any party to the conflict should come before the Tribunal. After all, I argued, a "crime" is an action that is wrong no matter who does it. Pressing my case, I asked, "What if it were shown that the National Liberation Front of South Vietnam tortures unarmed prisoners?" The answer, as I understood it, was, "Anything is justified that drives the imperialist aggressor into the sea." I declined the invitation to be a member of the Tribunal."

David Horowitz, who did some work for the Bertrand Russell Peace Foundation but did not participate in the Tribunal, wrote 30 years later about the criticism that the Russell Tribunal would not also investigate alleged Communist atrocities. In his memoirs, Horowitz wrote that Jean-Paul Sartre said, "I refuse to place in the same category the actions of an organization of poor peasants ... and those of an immense army backed by a highly organized country ...". Horowitz interpreted Sartre's words to mean "the Communists were, by definition, incapable of committing war crimes."

Judge Richard Goldstone, writing in The New York Times in October 2011, said of the Russell Tribunal on Palestine that "It is not a 'tribunal.' The 'evidence' is going to be one-sided and the members of the 'jury' are critics whose harsh views of Israel are well known. In Israel, there is no apartheid. Nothing there comes close to the definition of apartheid under the 1998 Rome Statute."

South African journalist and human rights activist Benjamin Pogrund, now living in Israel, described the Cape Town Session of the Russell Tribunal on Palestine as "It's theatre: the actors know their parts and the result is known before they start. Israel is to be dragged into the mud."

After the Cape Town session, Israeli MK Otniel Schneller filed a complaint with the Knesset's Ethics Committee against MK Hanin Zoabi, who testified at the Tribunal that "Israel is an apartheid state".

A group of Jewish South Africans protested against the court, and the organiser of the protest called it a "Kangaroo Court."

== See also ==
- Donald Duncan
- Human Rights Record of the United States
- International Tribunal on Crimes against Women
- Iran Tribunal
- Kangaroo court
- List of massacres in Vietnam
- My Lai Massacre
- Pentagon Papers
- Phoenix Program
- Tiger Force
- Vietnam War Crimes Working Group Files
- War crimes committed by the United States
- Winter Soldier Investigation
- World Courts of Women

== Sources ==
- Against the Crime of Silence: Proceedings of the Russell International War Crimes Tribunal, edited by J. Duffett, O'Hare Books, New York, 1968.
- Radical Son: A Generational Odyssey, by David Horowitz, Free Press, New York, 1997.
- War Crimes in Vietnam, by Bertrand Russell, 1967, see Postscript.
- North Vietnam: A Documentary, by John Gerassi, Allen & Unwin, London, 1968.
- Russelltribunalen. Directed by Staffan Lamm. 2003/2004.
