= Yayori Matsui =

Japanese activist (1934–2002)

- Born: April 12, 1934; Kyoto, Japan
- Died: December 27, 2002 (aged 68); Tokyo, Japan
- Known for: Women's rights in Asia

Yayori Matsui (松井やより Matsui Yayori) (April 12, 1934 – December 27, 2002) was a Japanese journalist and women's rights activist noted for her work to raise awareness of sex slaves and sex tourism in post-war Asia. In 1961 she began work as a journalist for the newspaper Asahi Shimbun, retiring in 1994 to work as a full-time social activist, founding numerous women's organizations and writing on gender inequality in Japan and on sex crimes committed by the Japanese Imperial Army, namely against the comfort women of the Second World War. Her work culminated in the 2000 Tokyo Women's War Crimes Tribunal, a tribunal held to gain some form of justice for the victims of Japanese military sexual slavery.

== Biography ==
Matsui was born in Kyoto, Japan, to a family of Christian ministers. Her family moved to Tokyo where her parents founded the Yamate Christian Church and raised their six children. Unable to graduate from high school due to a severe case of tuberculosis, she was nonetheless admitted to the Department of British and American Studies at the Tokyo University of Foreign Studies. Matsui was introduced to the feminist movement while on a trip to the United States and Europe during her junior year in college. In their work Gender in Modern East Asia, Barbara Molony, Janet Theiss, and Hyaeweol Choi state that she experienced revulsion at the blatant racism she encountered there and surprise over the disparity in wealth and equality between these regions and Asia. In later years, well-into her fight for "Pan-Asian feminist solidarity", Matsui criticized the way feminism operated in the United States, stating that she was "suspicious about the American model of empowerment, which means the right to grasp for power just as men do." In 1961, Matsui joined the Japanese newspaper Asahi Shimbun as a reporter, writing on public health and environmental issues, such as birth defects cause by Thalidomide and mercury poisoning (Minamata disease). As a representative of Asahi Shimbun and of the Asian Women's Association which she founded, Matsui attended all United Nations conferences from 1975 to 1995.

In 1976, she founded the organization Asian Women in Solidarity in opposition to sex tourism in Asia. In 1981, she was posted as a correspondent in Singapore, where she came into contact with comfort women, women who were forced into prostitution by the Japanese Imperial Army during the Second World War. She became the first woman to serve as the Asian General Bureau Correspondent for the Asahi Shimbun. In 1994, she resigned from Asahi to work full-time as a social activist, her decision influenced by the trend of Southeast Asian sex tourism among Japanese businessmen. Shortly after retiring, she founded the Asia-Japan Women's Resource Center, which continues to operate today.

In 1998, Matsui helped create the Japanese branch of Violence Against Women in War Network (VAWW-NET). Working with the Asia-Japan Women's Resource Center and other Japanese and East Asian women's organizations, she organized the Tokyo Women's War Crimes Tribunal from 1998 to 2000, devoted to crimes committed by the Japanese Imperial Army in the comfort system. In 2001, Matsui visited Afghanistan to meet with Afghan feminist-activists. While there, she was struck by illness, which was later diagnosed to be liver cancer. She died in a hospital in Tokyo in December 2002.

== Tokyo Women's War Crimes Tribunal ==
In 1998, the Violence Against Women in War Network, Japan, presented to the Asian Women's Solidarity Conference in Seoul the idea of holding a tribunal in order to achieve justice for the women victimized by the Japanese military's practice of sexual slavery in the Second World War. Matsui supported this idea and worked with women's rights organizations and advocates from China, Indonesia, the Philippines, Taiwan, East Timor, Malaysia, and North and South Korea in order to make the tribunal a reality. Preparation for the tribunal took place in Tokyo and Seoul and lasted from 1998 through 2000; preparation was headed by the International Organizing Committee which conducted research on the comfort system and its effects on victims. The tribunal was held from December 8 to December 12, 2000, in Tokyo, during which victims of the comfort system employed by the Japanese military in the 1930s and 1940s gave their testimony, as did lawyers and experts representing former comfort women from across East Asia and the Netherlands. Unlike previous trials dealing with the crimes committed by the Japanese military during the war, this tribunal named Emperor Hirohito as one of the defendants, accusing him of being complicit in the crimes committed against comfort women. Though invited, the Japanese government refused to send representatives from either the government or the emperor to the proceedings.

The tribunal was conducted using standard criminal trial procedures, though it held no power of law, and over 75 victims were present, with 35 former comfort women testifying during the proceedings. Documents were presented that implicated the Japanese government and emperor in the atrocities committed throughout the Japanese Empire against these women - kidnapping, rape, sexual abuse and assault, and even murder ranked in the indictments. The judges presiding over the tribunal found that the Japanese government and Emperor Hirohito were guilty of crimes against humanity in the form of the military policy that was the comfort system; later, a more complete ruling was issued in 2001 which cemented the preliminary ruling. Though the tribunal possessed no true legal power and those guilty of participating in the comfort system received no punishment for their crimes, it brought a form of justice to former comfort women and, in the process, revealed historical documents and records previously unavailable to the people of Japan and the world. The tribunal represented the power of civil society in terms of justice and law and showed the value of societal involvement in uncovering and preserving history, though not without criticism and attacks. Japanese mainstream media ignored the trial and the only coverage of the event, a broadcast by NHK (Nippon Hōsō Kyōkai), a Japanese television broadcaster, was altered due to pressure by conservative leaders, including the prime minister of Japan at the time, Shinzo Abe. Detractors to the tribunal, such as Takashi Nakamiya, a "leftist watcher," labeled it a mock tribunal in an attempt to discredit the value of the proceedings and of Matsui's work in general. An edition of the Takarajima Magazine's "Real" series features an article on "exceptionally stupid women," naming Matsui as one of these women. Nakamiya wrote the portion on her, calling her a "sinful woman" and criticizing her activism as being motivated by greed and ego. The article was mainly written by right-leaning men and was created to attack prominent leftist and feminist women.

== Legacy ==
While visiting Afghanistan in October 2001 to meet with Afghan feminists, Matsui became ill. Upon her return to Japan, she was diagnosed with liver cancer, at which point she began working on an autobiography and continued her work on designing a women's museum; Matsui died in a hospital in Tokyo on December 27, 2002. Her will granted her assets to the Human Rights Fund on Women's War and Peace which funded the building of the Women's Active Museum of War and Peace, a private museum based upon the focuses of her life's work and housing all documentation relating to the Tokyo Women's War Crimes Tribunal that opened in Tokyo in August 2005. In the words of Takashi Yoshida in From Cultures of War to Cultures of Peace, "the term 'active museum' was chosen to symbolize the committee's wish that the museum would play a pivotal role in enlightening the public and transforming each visitor into a socially active citizen." Even in death, she was criticized by some, Nakamiya claiming that the 1.5 million yen donated to Matsui during her illness was used selfishly by her, when, in fact, the money had been used to build the Women's Active Museum of War and Peace. Despite such criticisms and attacks, Matsui's legacy of fighting for former comfort women and women victimized by war lives on in her numerous works on Japanese and East Asian women and in the inspiration her life and works give to those working towards gender equality worldwide.

== Literary works ==
=== Books ===
- Women's Asia (1989) which deals with Asian women's economic perspectives and details the role they play in the economies of Asia.
- Women in the New Asia: From Pain to Power (2000) in which Matsui deals with the effects of globalization on human rights, focusing on the women of Japan, Thailand, the Philippines, Taiwan, China, Nepal, and Korea.

=== Articles ===
- Japan Becoming a War State-Let Us Cry Out against War with Women around the World (2002)
- Women's International War Crimes Tribunal on Japan's Military Sexual Slavery - Success Brought by the Power of Women's Transnational Solidarity (2001)
- Women's International War Crimes Tribunal on Japan's Military Sexual Slavery - An NGO Attempt to Restore Justice for Victimized Women and to Prevent Future Wartime Violence against Women (2001)

== See also ==
- Feminism in Japan
- Asia-Japan Women's Resource Center
- Asahi Shimbun
- Comfort Women
- Women's Rights
- Feminism
- Sex Tourism
