= BRussells Tribunal =

Series of hearings in Brussels, Belgium

The BRussells Tribunal refers both to a series of hearings that took place in Brussels, Belgium from 14 to 17 April 2004, as part of the World Tribunal on Iraq, and to the group of people who organised these hearings.

== Claim of assassination campaign against Iraqi academics ==
In January 2006, the BRussells Tribunal distributed a statement (as part of a petition) supporting Robert Fisk's earlier, 14 July 2004, statement that "University staff suspect that there is a campaign to strip Iraq of its academics, to complete the destruction of Iraq's cultural identity which began when the American army entered Baghdad."

The BRussells Tribunal claimed that violence against academics in post-invasion Iraq amounts to a systematic campaign to liquidate Iraqi academics, with the assassination of over 250 academics and disappearance of hundreds of others, was occurring. Combined with Iraqi academics leaving the country due to fear for their safety, the claim is that the Iraqi academic community was being literally destroyed, and that as of 2006, the campaign has not stopped.

While Robert Fisk cited some hypotheses of the groups behind the killings, the BRussells Tribunal claimed that the wave of assassinations was "non-partisan and non-sectarian, targeting women as well as men, countrywide, indiscriminate of expertise: professors of geography, history and Arabic literature as well as science are among the dead."

According to the tribunal, no suspects have been apprehended in connection with the assassinations as of early 2006. The group note that "as an occupying power, and under international humanitarian law, the final responsibility for protecting Iraqi citizens, including academics, lies with the United States."

== See also ==
- Russell Tribunal
