= World Courts of Women =

The World Courts of Women are public hearings that give a forum to those who are traditionally excluded from formal political and legal proceedings. Organized around particular topics relevant to the hosting country, these unofficial public enquiries highlight the injustices that women face. They include testimonies of personal experience, analyses by scholars and activists, and skill-sharing and strategizing. Through these, the World Courts aim to educate and raise awareness, record injustice and human rights violations, give voice to marginalized women, and develop alternative visions and strategies for the future.

== Overview ==
World Courts of Women are symbolic processes that hold unofficial public enquiries into crimes against women, including the violation of their basic human rights. The main function of these hearings is to allow an opportunity for participants to relate experiences that are not widely publicized by traditional media sources and public discourse. It aims to challenge dominant public discourse by pointing to contradictions between principles of human rights and the experiences of women. The secondary function is for the testimony to provide a resource for social movements and political movements working for social justice and women's liberation, which seek to hold powerful governments and other entities accountable to human rights standards and international law and "transform the dominant paradigm of politics."

The World Courts of Women have been inspired and promoted by Corinne Kumar, an activist leader in the Tunis-based non-governmental organization and human rights advocacy group, El Taller International. In the countries where these occur, the intent is to hold their governments accountable to both international law and human ethics. While such courts lack official legitimacy, by pointing out the failures of formal laws to protect women, they can help undermine the popular acceptance of government authority that is based in patriarchy. In this sense, they aim to increase popular sovereignty and to delegitimize institutions, bureaucracy, and other social groups which are thought to be inadequate in punishing persons who violate the ethics and norms, if not also the formal laws, governing society. They challenge the traditional notion of power and powerholders; according to Kumar, "moving out of the patriarchal mindset would mean refusing the mono-dimensional definition of power, seeking to redefine and relocate power, to discover an alternate concept of power, to find new patterns of power."

There are many gender biases’ in the courts especially against women. Women can be denied equal justice, equal treatment, and equal opportunity (Harbour). Women have had laws passed to protect them against violence. It took many years to actually allow them to recognize women as victims of stalking or sexual harassment. Eventually laws were passed to protect these victims. Many women have experienced and lived through the domestic violence that was done to them and no one believed them. Now society is finally recognizing the violence against women more than ever before. Even though women are still put down compared to men in certain situations or jobs the world has evolved to better the understanding that women are just as capable as men.

== People's tribunals ==
People’s tribunals assert that targeted judicial systems are failing to provide access for low-income, minority, and other non-elite groups and individuals to prosecute or even bring forth a criminal charge. Investigation is also made into laws recognized by states that fail to consider personal and cultural values of human rights and dignity. These tribunals are also intended to help strengthen international conventions or norms to which governments and other elites are held.

The social spaces where the World Courts of Women occur are communities in which "social categories are suspended, roles become fluid and interaction is privileged." The symbolic use of the World Courts of Women intends to provide influence, power, and standing for victims unable to find resolution in official judicial systems and institutions.

The first International War Crimes Tribunal was an investigative body immediately followed the 1966 publication of Bertrand Russell's book, War Crimes in Vietnam. The tribunal investigated and evaluated the United States of America's foreign policy and military intervention in Vietnam and provided a model for further tribunals related to war crimes, human rights violations, and environmental protection.

The International Tribunal on Crimes against Women was a people's tribunal which took place on March 4–8, 1976 in Brussels, Belgium. The event was created with the intention to "make public the full range of crimes, both violently brutal and subtly discriminatory, committed against women of all cultures."

== History ==
What follows is a partial list of past World Courts.

In 1992 the first World Court of Women, called the "Asia Court on Violence Against Women" was held in Lahore, Pakistan. The Courts of Women organized by Asian Women's Human Rights Council (AWHRC) in the Asia Pacific region inspired courts in other regions, particularly in the Arab world, Africa, and Central America. In 1995 Arab women organized the Arab Women's Court with the assistance of human rights organizations including the international NGO, El Taller. That year the court held a public hearing in Beirut, Lebanon on violence directed against women. In 1996 the Mahkamate El Nissa El Arabiya (Permanent Arab Women’s Court) was established. Different member organizations were to host this court on a rotating basis.

The Women's International War Crimes Tribunal on Japan's Military Sexual Slavery was held in December 2000. It was a people's tribunal convened to gather testimony from victims, and then, based on international laws that were in place during World War II, to try groups and individuals for rape or sexual slavery, i.e., forcing women to sexually service Japanese soldiers.

The World Court of Women Against War, for Peace was held March 8, 2001 in Khayelitsha, Cape Town, South Africa to bear witness to the enormous violence and genocide caused by wars around the world. 4,000 people from around the Republic of South Africa and the world participated.

World Court of Women on U.S. War Crimes took place in Mumbai, India, on January 18, 2004, as part of the 2004 World Social Forum.

The 36th Court of Women, "Daughters of Fire : The Indian Court of Women on Dowry and Related Forms of Violence Against Women" was held in Bangalore, India on July 26–29, 2009.

The 37th Court of Women, "Southeast Asia Court of Women on HIV and Human Trafficking" was held on August 6, 2009 during the 9th International Congress on AIDS in Asia and the Pacific (ICAAP) in Nusa Dua, Bali. Twenty-two women, from six Southeast Asian countries (Indonesia, Thailand, Burma, the Philippines, Cambodia, and Singapore) spoke about living with HIV/AIDS and their experiences with human trafficking, exploitation, and violence against women.

"World Court of Women on Poverty in the United States: Disappeared in America" was the first US example, held in Oakland, California, USA, from May 10–13, 2012. Representing the western region of the country, the focus was on poverty in the U.S.

In 2013, another World Court of Women was held in Philadelphia, Pennsylvania.

The 2015 session took place in Bangalore, India, to witness the violence and injustice, and highlight the political lessons and resistance, and oppose "the unending wars against women".
