= Stanislava Staša Zajović =

Serbian feminist (born 1953)

Staša Zajović Сташа Зајовић
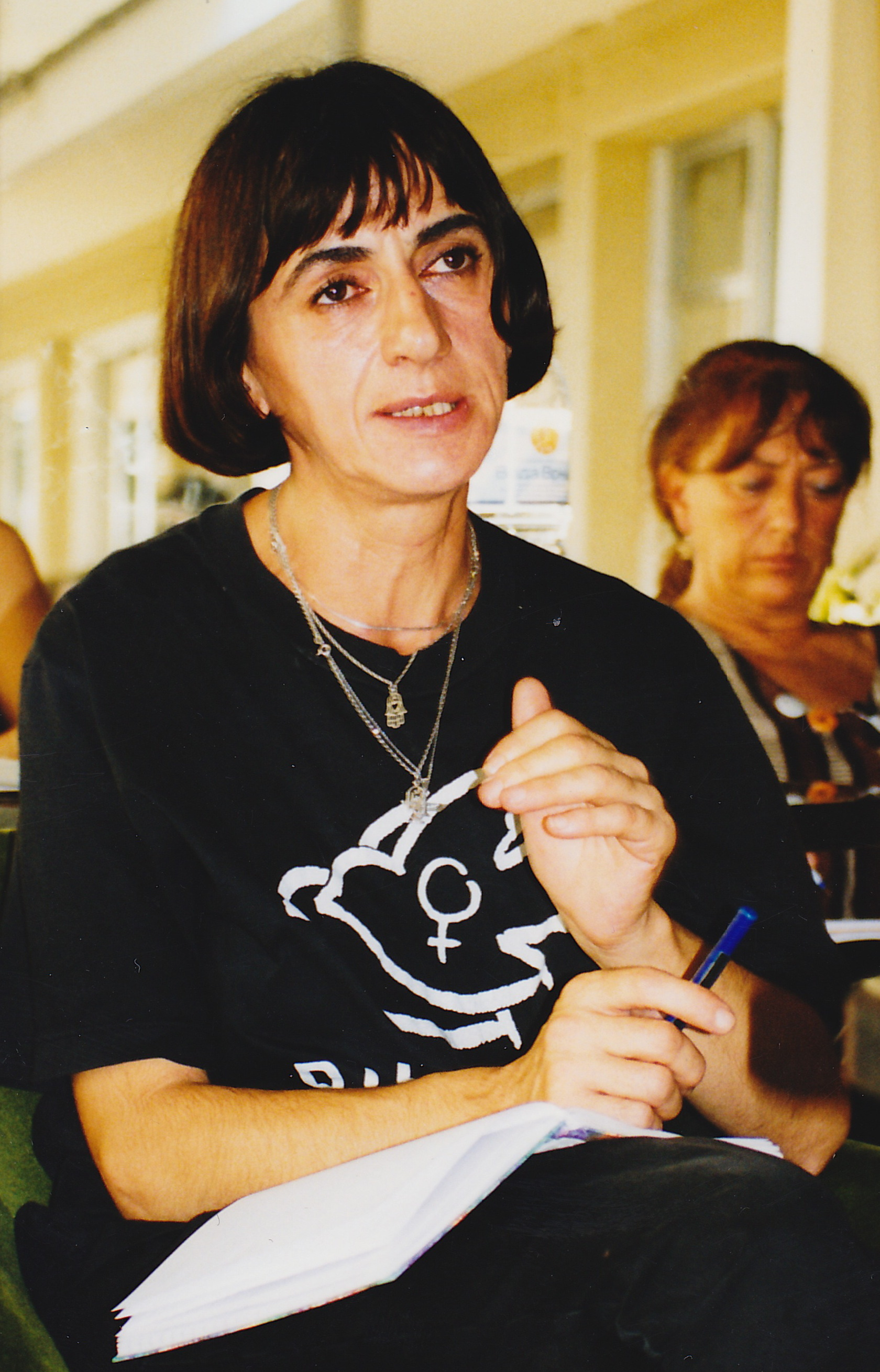
- Zajović in 1999
- Born: Stanislava Zajović; January 25, 1953 (age 73); Nikšić, PR Montenegro, FPR Yugoslavia
- Occupations: Anti-war activist; feminist
- Organization: Women in Black (1991–present)

Stanislava Staša Zajović (Serbo-Croatian Cyrillic: Станислава Сташа Зајовић; born January 25, 1953) is a Montenegrin-born Serbian feminist and anti-war activist. She is the co-founder and coordinator of Women in Black in Belgrade, Serbia.

== Biography ==
She graduated Spanish and Italian language at Belgrade University and joined feminist movement in 1980s in Belgrade.

She is engaged in many feminist activities from organizing street actions to working with refugees, women, etc. She initiated several women's networks, like Women’s Peace Network,The International Network of Women’s Solidarity against War/International Women in Black Network, Network of Conscientious Objectors and Anti militarism in Serbia, The Coalition for a Secular State, etc.

Staša among laureates of One Law for All in 2018

She organized numerous educational activities focusing on women’s human rights, women’s peace politics, inter-ethnic and inter-cultural solidarity, women and power, women and anti-militarism. She was instrumental in expanding the network of Women in Black in the world. For example, in her book Mujeres en pie de paz, Carmen Magallón relates that Staša's visit to Spain in 1993, her ideas and commitment, influenced the creation of the group Women in Black in that country.

Staša Zajović is the author of numerous essays, articles and supplements in local, regional and international media, magazines and publications on women and politics, reproductive rights, war, nationalism and militarism, women’s resistance to war, and anti militarism (1992–present). In 2017, Staša Zajović signed the Declaration on the Common Language of the Croats, Serbs, Bosniaks and Montenegrins.

She was part of Women in Black representation at commemoration events to war victims in Vukovar (Croatia) and speaker for the protest that marked anniversary of start of the war in Bosnia, highlighting the lack of visibility of these events, victims and processing of war crimes.

She has been nominated for and she won a range of prizes and awards. Among these are the following: Millennium Peace Prize for Women, Honorary Citizenship of Tutin, Honorary Citizenship of Granada, etc. She was nominated for The Nobel Peace Prize as part of the 1,000 Women for the Nobel Peace Prize campaign in 2005, also in 2005 and 2007 she was nominated for Newspaper Person of the Year by the daily Danas.
