= Émile Kahn =

Emile Joseph Kahn (born 21 December 1876 in Paris – died on 21 January 1958 in Montpellier) was the president of the Human Rights League (France) from 1953 to 1958.

== Biography ==
Secretary-General of the League of Human Rights from 1932 to 1953, Emile Kahn became its president in 1953 and remained so until his death in 1958. In the 1930s, he was a sincere supporter of the Popular Front. He was violently hostile to the global rejection of colonization and the possibility of some self-determination for indigenous peoples, on the contrary, he thinks it is the duty of the colonial powers to civilize the natives until they are able to exercise their human rights.

In 1957, he published The League's fight for democracy, in which he expressed his political ideas and his fight for human rights.

His wife, Suzanne Collette-Kahn (1884-1975), an associate Professor of German, was vice-president of the League of Human Rights and Secretary-General of the International Federation for Human Rights.

== Quote ==
"The League of Human Rights remains attached to this idea that men enlisted under the flag are citizens and they may be asked to choose between two tasks: that of obeying their leaders or acting against them, the Constitution and the Republic "13 (May 1935)
