= Arié Alimi =

French lawyer

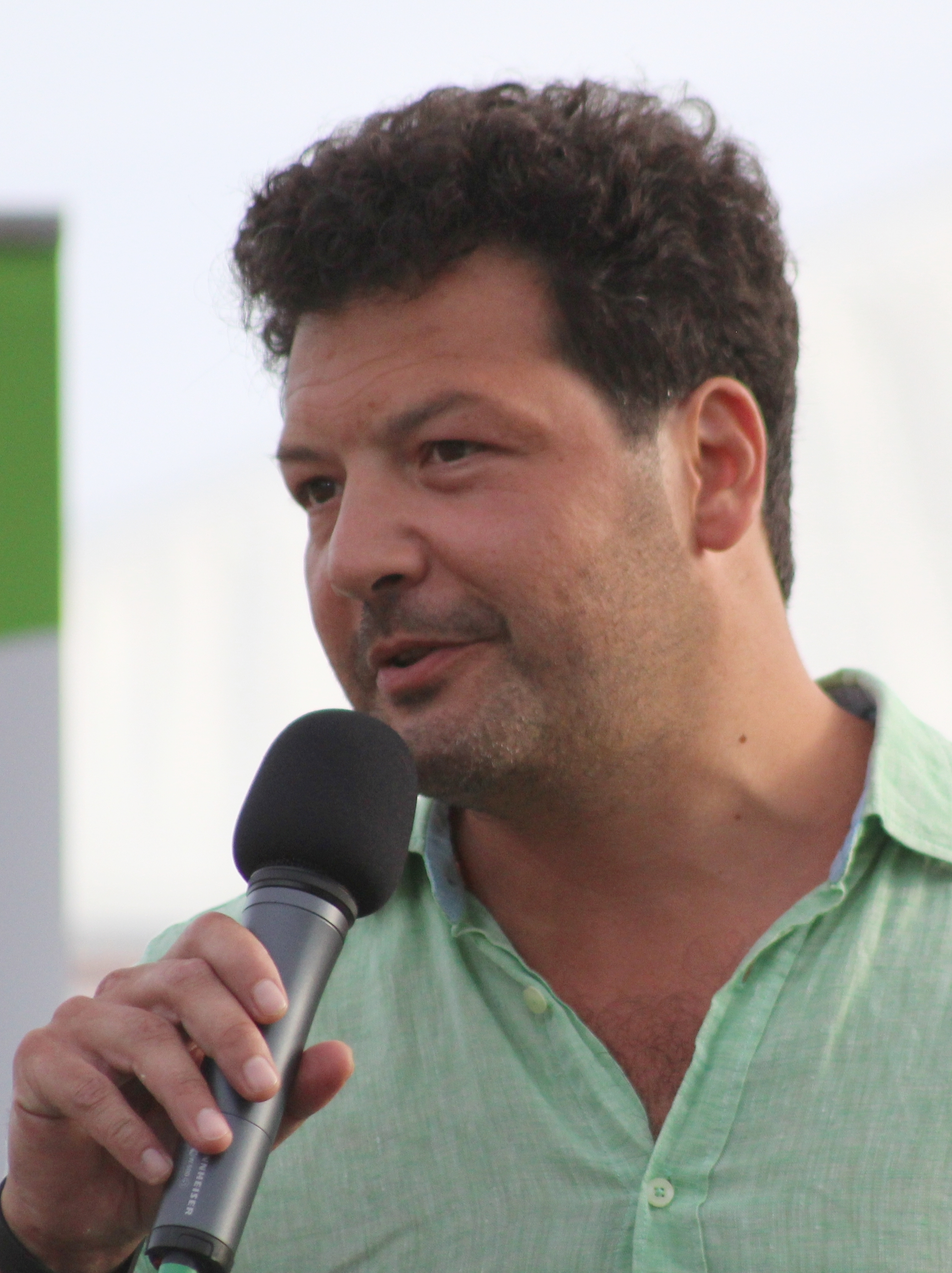

Arié Alimi (born 1977 in Sarcelles), is a French lawyer and a member of the Human Rights League (LDH).

== Biography ==
Son of a physiotherapist, of Algerian origin, Arié Alimi studied at the private Jewish school for boys Ozar Hatorah in Sarcelles until the third grade.

After a year at the Medical School (6th arrondissement of Paris) he decided to study law at Pantheon-Assas University where he obtained in 2000 a DESS degree in the laws of business and taxation. then a diploma in business legal counsel. He became involved during his years of study within the Union of Jewish Students of France.

In 2001 he joined the Paris Barrier - his sister was also a lawyer. He studied at the School for Advanced Studies in the Social Sciences (EHESS), where he obtained a Master of Advanced Studies.

After working for Urbino et associés, he founded his firm specializing in commercial real estate law.

In January 2021, he published with Éditions du Seuil a book entitled The emergency coup: surveillance, repression and freedoms.

== Special cases ==
Arié Alimi is specialized in cases of police violence.

- Rémi Fraisse's family
- Case of journalist Taha Bouhafs.
- About twenty yellow vests
- Case of Jean-Luc Mélenchon,

He is also the lawyer for rapper Sadek, and alert launcher and police officer Amar Benmohamed.

== Personal life ==
He has claimed to be an atheist since the age of 18 but respects the dietary prescriptions of the Jewish religion under “tradition” and “culture”. His partner is Cécile Duflot.

== Works ==
- Le coup d'État d'urgence : surveillance, répression et libertés, Éditions du Seuil, 2021.
