= Henri Leclerc (lawyer) =

French criminal defense lawyer (1934–2024)

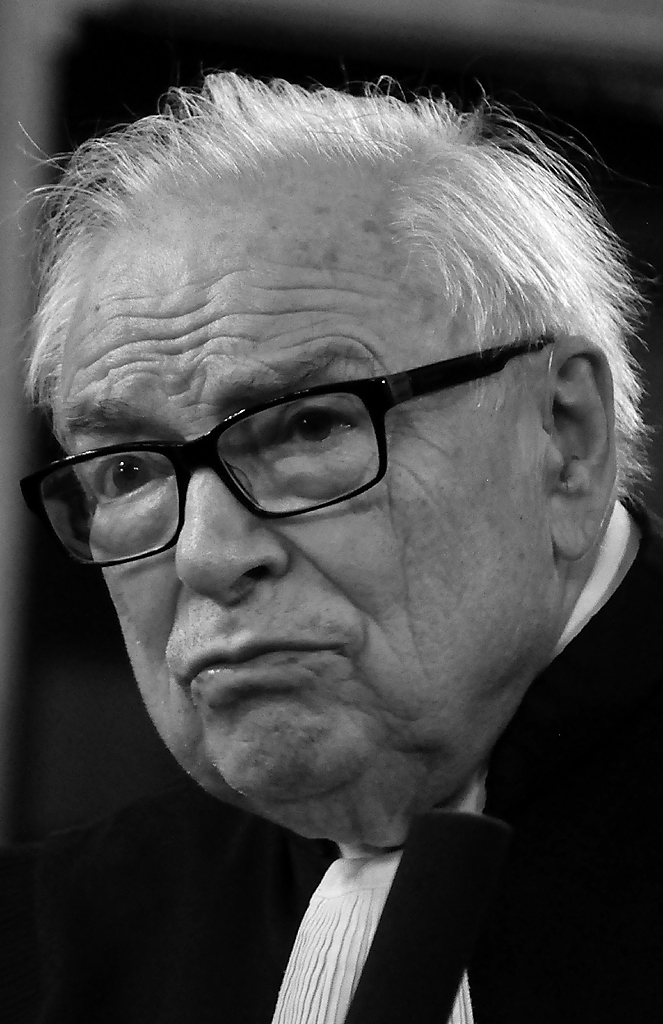
- Leclerc in 2014

President of Human Rights League
- In office 2000–2024

Human Rights League
- In office 1995–2000

Personal details
- Born: Henri Leclerc; 8 June 1934 Saint-Sulpice-Laurière, France
- Died: 31 August 2024 (aged 90) Paris, France
- Party: Unified Socialist Party (France)
- Education: Faculty of Law of Paris (Lycée Lakanal)
- Profession: Lawyer

Henri Leclerc (French pronunciation: [ɑ̃ʁi ləklɛʁ]; 8 June 1934 – 31 August 2024) was a French criminal defense lawyer.

A member of the Human Rights League, he was its president from 1995 to 2000 and honorary president from 2000 to 2024.

== Biography ==
=== Early life and education ===
Henri Leclerc was the brother-in-law of Nicos Poulantzas. His father was a veteran of the First World War, He was an agnostic tax inspector, while his mother was very pious. Henri Leclerc grew up with his brother and two sisters in a house near Paris in Sceaux, Hauts-de-Seine. Barely he was ten years old, follows the major trials of the Liberation (notably the trials of Philippe Pétain, Pierre Laval and Robert Brasillach) through the reports given by the press. He was dismayed by the trial of Pierre Laval, which his execution carried out in a pitiful manner.

He completed his secondary studies at the lycée Lakanal, where he became friends with the son of Maurice Thorez. He obtained a law degree in 1955 from the Faculty of Law of Paris. He joined the Communist Party of the Russian Federation (PCF) for two years and sold L'Humanité by auction, which led to other fights with the opposing camp. He left the PCF the day before the Soviet Union intervened in Budapest.

In 2011, he joined Martine Aubry's campaign team for the Socialist primaries for the 2012 presidential election, as the candidate's advisor on justice issues, alongside former Minister of Justice Élisabeth Guigou and Marie-Pierre de La Gontrie.

In 2012, he signed the column entitled "For a new republic" calling for a vote for candidate François Hollande.

== Career as a lawyer ==
He was sworn in as a lawyer on 14 December 1955. He began his career as a solicitor alongside the lawyer Albert Naud, known for having been Pierre Laval's lawyer during the Purge. He inherited his legal library (which the latter had himself received from Raymond Poincaré).

A member of the Paris Bar Council, he was president of the French League for the Defense of Human and Citizen Rights from 1995 to 2000 and then its honorary president.

He accompanied the social movement, alongside working peasants, miners, the CFDT, activists fighting for the improvement of detention conditions - he denounced the conditions of detention in high security prisons and supporters of an independent press.

Henri Leclerc has defended famous clients, such as the newspaper Libération, the mathematician Alexandre Grothendieck, Richard Roman, Lucien Léger, Charlie Bauer, Michel Vaujour, François Besse, Roger Knobelspiess, Florence Rey, Doctor Archambeau, Hélène Castel, Jacques Viguier, Véronique Courjault, Dominique de Villepin, Dominique Strauss-Kahn (in the case that opposed him to Tristane Banon then in the so-called Carlton case in Lille) and Alain Lipietz, who was convicted of defamation.

During the Jacques Tillier-Jacques Mesrine case in September 1979, the former having been left for dead at the bottom of a mushroom cellar, he defended one of the suspects, Charlie Bauer, who since 1977 has been granted parole, found a job as a bookseller and started a family. He discovers that his wife Renée Gindrat's account was checked as early as September two days before the identikit portrait inspired to the victim by a photo of Charlie Bauer and then questions Commissioner Mireille Ballestrazzi, who does not know why the OCRB did the financial research of September 13, which will allow her to obtain Bauer's acquittal at the trial in 1982, even if he is convicted of cannabis trafficking and receiving stolen property from part of a ransom from another kidnapping.

He also defends Algerian independence activists, Breton autonomists and, after May 68, for years "leftists" being nicknamed at the time for this reason "the lawyer of the leftists".

During the reconstruction for the Roman and Gentil affair, he is manhandled by the angry village crowd.

He also acted as a civil party in the Omar Raddad case (representing the family of Ghislaine Marchal), represented the family of Pierre Overney, and defended the ex-boxer Christophe Dettinger, accused of intentional violence against police officers.

He pleaded for the last time in 2020.

== Death ==
Henri Leclerc died of a stroke on 31 August 2024 at the Paul-Brousse Hospital in Villejuif at the age of 90.

=== After his death ===
Patrick Beaudouin, president of the French League of Human Rights, said: "At this moment, with sadness and with the feeling of a great emptiness... It is sometimes said that no one is irreplaceable, but this is false for some people, and especially for him. He really had a very special style. He had a very warm voice. As soon as he started to speak, he won over his audience with his warm voice..."

== Tribute ==
The 2015-2016 class of the Professional Training School of the Bar of the Paris Court of Appeal (EFB), of which he is the sponsor, bears his name, as does the 2017-2018 class of the Master 2 Criminology at the Paris-Panthéon-Assas University. The 2022-2023 class of the Master 2 Criminal Law and Criminal Sciences of Strasbourg also bears his name.

== Decorations ==
- Legion of Honour

== Publications ==
- A fight for justice, Éditions La Découverte, 1994.
- co-written with Jean-Marc Théolleyre, The media and justice, CFPJ, 1996.
- with W.-H. Fridman, The Defense, Publisher EDP Sciences, 2002.
- The Penal Code, Éditions du Seuil, 2005.
- interview with Henri Leclerc, by Christophe Perrin and Laurence Gaune, Lawyers’ career path, Blue Rider Editions, 2010.
- Words and Action, Fayard, 2017.

== Filmography ==
The documentary series Footprints of France 5 dedicated an issue to him, Henri Leclerc, in the name of the man, a 52-minute film written and directed by Rémi Lainé and co-produced by France 5 / Campagne Première/ INA; production déléguée Carole Bienaimé; broadcast on 28 September 2008.

Henri Leclerc appears in the documentary On the Roofs by Nicolas Drolc produced in 2014. It tells the story of the trial of the Nancy prison mutineers on 8 June 1972.
