= Yves Jouffa =

French politician and lawyer

- Born: 20 January 1920; Paris, France
- Died: 13 January 1999 (aged 78)
- Occupation(s): Lawyer, activist
- Organization: French Resistance
- Known for: Surviving the Holocaust

Yves Jouffa (20 January 1920 – 13 January 1999) was a human rights activist, member of French Resistance, and lawyer.

== Biography ==
His father Yankel was born in Zhitomir, then-part of the Russian Empire, and his mother Rebecca was Romanian.

Jouffa joined the Young Socialist Movement (Jeunesses Socialistes) at the age of 16 and became, two years later, one of the leaders of the Socialist Students of Paris. On 20 August 1941 he was arrested by French police and was imprisoned at the Camp Drancy until 14 September 1942. He then continued with STO (Service du travail obligatoire) which made him go into hiding. He also joined the FFI (French Forces of the Interior) to take part in the fight for the liberation of Normandy.

After the war, in 1957, he continued his struggle and became one of the founders of the Union of the Socialist Left (UGS) and the Unified Socialist Party (France) (PSU) in 1960. In 1967 he left the organization to create, with others, the Union of Socialist Groups and Clubs (UGCS).

A member and vice-president of the Human Rights League (France), he became its president in 1984. Under his leadership, the League provided the right to vote in local elections for non-EU foreign residents. In 1988, he became an adviser in human rights to the Prime Minister and Vice-President.

Jouffa died in 1999 and is buried in the Montparnasse Cemetery.
