= Stuart F. Feldman =

American lawyer

Stuart Franklin Feldman (January 20, 1937 – July 11, 2010) was an American lobbyist and social activist who worked in the administrations of John F. Kennedy, Lyndon B. Johnson and Richard Nixon. He co-founded in 1978 what became Vietnam Veterans of America together with Bobby Muller. Feldman was a longtime advocate for greater awareness of the needs of veterans and seeing to it that they were provided with better education, health care and job opportunities.

Feldman was born on January 20, 1937, in Philadelphia and graduated in 1954 from Cheltenham High School. He earned an undergraduate degree in 1958 from the University of Pennsylvania with a major in economics. He was awarded his law degree in 1961 from the University of Pennsylvania Law School. He went to Washington, D.C., where he was employed by the Securities and Exchange Commission, the Appalachian Regional Commission and the Department of Transportation. He left the federal government in the 1970s, taking a post as a lobbyist with the United States Conference of Mayors.

Seeing veterans returning from the Vietnam War, Feldman saw many who were unemployed and didn't have the skills necessary for work. Feldman lobbied on behalf of a threefold expansion in education benefits available to each veteran under the G.I. Bill, increasing the monthly benefit from $100 a month to $300. His efforts led to the development of 1,000 veterans' counseling centers at colleges nationwide, with cash awards paid to those colleges and universities that enrolled veterans and assisted them in gaining employment. Together with Bob Hope, Feldman formed "Hope for Education" in 1970, an effort that led to 50,000 soldiers enrolling for G.I. benefits while attending the entertainer's Christmas tour. Feldman helped found Vietnam Veterans of America in 1978, together with Bobby Muller, a veteran who had been paralyzed during his service in Vietnam.

A 1977 article in Fortune magazine stated he "single-handedly... won billions of dollars for veterans programs". Gerald Nicosia, in his 2001 book Home to War: A History of the Vietnam Veterans' Movement recounted an incident in which Feldman came to testify before the United States House Committee on Veterans' Affairs, when a staffer muttered that "The last time you were here, you cost us a billion dollars".

Mr. Feldman was also successful in bringing the special plight of returning service members to the attention of Washington Post editorial board editor Philip L. Geyelin and columnist Colman McCarthy. Geyelin, McCarthy and others in The Post's opinion pages wrote more than 30 columns and editorials pushing the government to take better care of returning troops.

"For Stuart Feldman, the people who really scorned Vietnam veterans were not the occasional anti-war protesters, but members of Congress who sent them to war and then willfully looked away when they came home in desperate need of health care and education," McCarthy said Wednesday. "His advocacy was of the rarest kind in Washington: relentless, informed and humane. If there were a medal of honor for valor in defending the rights of veterans, Stu Feldman would surely have earned one."

During the 1980-90's, he worked doggedly on establishing a museum in Philadelphia that would educate visitors about the United States Constitution, which led to the 2003 establishment of the National Constitution Center, near the Liberty Bell and Independence Hall. In an article released shortly before the center opened, the Philadelphia Daily News lamented the lack of credit being given to Feldman, stating that his 1984 proposal was "seminal to the center that's come to be".

The National Constitution Center opened in 2003, two blocks from the Liberty Bell and Independence Hall. Mr. Feldman, who helped secure millions of dollars in congressional appropriations for the museum, was a member of its board for 17 years.

He also advocated on behalf of a monument dedicated to Martin Luther King Jr. on the National Mall, which he envisioned would be engraved with the text of King's 1963 "I Have a Dream" speech. In 1998, the National Capital Planning Commission approved the Martin Luther King Jr. Memorial, completed in 2011 in West Potomac Park next to the National Mall.

A resident of Center City, Philadelphia, died at age 73 on July 11, 2010, at the Hospital of the University of Pennsylvania due to complications of multiple myeloma.
