= Jeff Sharlet (activist) =

American activist (1942–1969)

Jeff Sharlet, linguist, U.S. Army Security Agency, 1963–1964

Jeff Sharlet (1942–1969), a Vietnam veteran, was a leader of the GI resistance movement during the Vietnam War and the founding editor of Vietnam GI. David Cortright, a major chronicler of the Vietnam GI protest movement wrote, "Vietnam GI, the most influential early paper, surfaced at the end of 1967, distributed to tens of thousands of GIs, many in Vietnam, closed down after the death of founder Jeff Sharlet in June, 1969."

== Biography ==
=== Early life ===
Sharlet was born and raised in Glens Falls, New York, a small town in the foothills of the Adirondacks, and later in the state capital of Albany. In 1960 he graduated from The Albany Academy, a private military academy.

=== Military training and assignment: Philippines ===
Restless during his first year of college, Sharlet withdrew and decided to fulfill his military obligation. In return for a three-year enlistment in the United States Army Security Agency (ASA), a communications intelligence outfit, he was promised a year's training in a Slavic language followed by a European posting.

But at the Army Language School he was bumped into the Vietnamese language course. He and fellow students spent six hours a day in class over 11½ months. In early 1963 Sharlet was sent to Clark Air Base in the Philippines where he was assigned to the 9th ASA at Stotsenberg Field Station as a Vietnamese translator/interpreter. With a Top Secret/Cryptographic security clearance he and fellow linguists monitored Vietnam People's Army radio communications.

== Vietnam duty ==
In late August 1963 Sharlet and a small team of linguists were flown to Saigon on short notice and transferred to the Army Security Agency's 3rd Radio Research Unit, Davis Station, Tan Son Nhut Air Base outside the capital. The transfer occurred at the time of the secret US-backed coup planning by South Vietnamese generals against the Ngo Dinh Diem regime.

From Davis Station, Sharlet and seven others were dispatched to Phú Lâm, a US Signals base, where they worked on a remote corner of the base apart from Army signals personnel. Each day's product was sent by heavily armed jeep down to Tan Son Nhut from where it was airlifted to Washington, D.C. for analysis at the National Security Agency. Very shortly before the November 1 coup which overthrew Diem, Sharlet and the special team were pulled out and ordered back to Clark Air Base in the Philippines. By then, as he later related to family, he was beginning to experience doubts about the U.S. mission in Vietnam.

A few months later, Sharlet was shipped back to South Vietnam, this time on the eve of the January 1964 South Vietnamese coup by General Nguyen Khanh against the junta on January 30. Following the quick success of the coup, Sharlet was reassigned north to Phu Bai Combat Base an Army Security Agency base south the DMZ. There he was attached to Detachment J, a branch of the 3rd Radio Research Unit providing communications support for commando operations in North Vietnam. Sharlet was also seconded to a nearby Marine intelligence unit for Long Range Reconnaissance Patrols. By the time he finished his Vietnam tour late May 1964, Sharlet had seen enough political corruption and military incompetence of the Army of the Republic of Vietnam (ARVN), often compounded by exaggerated, upbeat reports by U.S. military advisors, to become thoroughly disillusioned with U.S. involvement in what he considered a Vietnamese civil war.

== SDS days at Indiana University ==
Sharlet returned to college fall of 1964, re-entering Indiana University (IU) in Bloomington where he majored in Political Science. In early 1965, the Vietnam War escalated with the launching of U.S. bombing raids against the North and the landing of Marine combat units in the South. By April, student protest against the war had begun to spread on U.S. campuses. At IU, early organizers of a chapter of Students for a Democratic Society (SDS) in 1965 included Bob and John Grove, Robin Hunter, Peter Montague, Karl North, Rick Ross, Bernella and David Satterfield, Jim Wallihan, and Sharlet.

In the fall of 1965 Sharlet joined SDS, and during his following two years at IU participated in, helped organize, or co-led SDS demonstrations against campus visits by several prominent pro-Vietnam War speakers, including former Vice President Richard Nixon, General Maxwell Taylor, General Lewis Blaine Hershey, and President Lyndon Baines Johnson when he spoke in nearby Indianapolis.

On campus, he supported the protest against the arrest of two members of the leftist youth W.E.B. Du Bois Club, Bruce Klein and Allen Gurevitz. During his tenure as SDS co-chairman Spring term 1967, with the help of Bob Tennyson, Sharlet took public issue with IU President Elvis Jacob Stahr, Jr., a former Secretary of the Army, over his criticism of the New Left and later played a significant role in getting SDS activist Guy Loftman elected IU student body president.

Sharlet won a Woodrow Wilson Graduate Fellowship which he chose to use at University of Chicago in its Political Science PhD program beginning fall 1967.

== Chicago and 'Vietnam GI' ==
During his IU years Sharlet had pondered the question of how to give voice to opposition to the war which he knew existed among many Vietnam GIs. In the summer of 1967 he went to New York City where he met fellow ex-Vietnam GI Jan Barry Crumb and joined his fledgling organization, Vietnam Veterans Against the War (VVAW). Returning to Chicago Sharlet began graduate work, but by the end of the Fall term decided to withdraw to resume his anti-war work full-time.

Using his Woodrow Wilson Fellowship funds, Sharlet launched the first GI-run anti-war paper addressed to GIs, calling it Vietnam GI (VGI). The first issue was dated January, 1968. His associate editor was David Komatsu, and the editorial board of ex-Vietnam GIs included Jan Barry, [Joseph Carey], William Harris, Peter Martinsen, Dink McCarter, James Pidgeon, Gary Rader, Francis Rocks, David Tuck, and James Zaleski. A civilian conscientious objector, Thomas Barton, served as VGI's East Coast distributor and was responsible for unobtrusively shipping bundles of the paper to Vietnam.

Vietnam GI (March 1968)

Vietnam GI quickly became a success among GIs stateside and in Vietnam where soldiers like Terry DeMott, a helicopter door gunner in the Americal Division stationed near Chu Lai, and a number of sympathetic unit mail clerks helped circulate the paper surreptitiously. It was free to GIs, and requests for individual subscriptions as well as multiple copies for distribution in stateside barracks and Vietnam combat units soared, with the print run reaching 30,000 copies by fall 1968. Letters-to-the editor indicated that single copies passed through many hands. In August a separate "Stateside" edition of VGI was launched.

Between issues, Sharlet worked wealthy liberal circles on both coasts for contributions to support production costs. Barbara Garson, author of MacBird, a widely performed anti-war play of the late 1960s, was an especially helpful West Coast contact. While traveling, Sharlet kept in touch with civilian activists running GI coffee houses outside major bases, including Judy Olasov at Ft. Leonard Wood, Missouri; Larry Langowski at Fort Sill, Oklahoma; and Donna Mickleson, national coordinator of the coffee house movement based in the San Francisco Bay area, as well as draft resistance groups which distributed Vietnam GI at induction centers, including CADRE (Chicago Area Draft Resisters) and the Boston Draft Resistance Group in New England, which not only helped by having the paper printed in Boston but also by shipping copies into Vietnam and distributing it throughout New England.

In late 1968 Sharlet visited the Oleo Strut, the highly activist GI coffee house, and nearby Fort Hood in Killeen, Texas. Run by Josh Gould and Janet "Jay" Lockard, it was associated with the strike of the "Fort Hood 43," Black troops who refused riot duty at the August 1968 Democratic National Convention in Chicago. Sharlet also represented the burgeoning GI anti-war movement at conferences in Japan and in Sweden where he worked with the theologians Harvey Cox, Michael Novak, and the late Richard John Neuhaus.

== Illness and death ==
The success of Vietnam GI and the growing GI protest against the war led to national media coverage for Sharlet and the paper in Esquire, New York Times, and on NBC Nightly Television News as well as the AP and NEA newswire services. In early 1969 a problem first experienced in Vietnam resurfaced, and he underwent surgery for kidney cancer. As David Komatsu wrote in Vietnam GI, "From there it was steadily downhill all the way. At the end, he said he had many new ideas for our fight, but was just too exhausted to talk about them." Sharlet died on June 16, 1969, age 27.

== Posthumous recognition ==
Sharlet's work as a founder of the GI protest movement was eulogized in the underground press throughout the country, including The Movement, Veterans Stars & Stripes for Peace, Guardian, and The Old Mole of Cambridge, Massachusetts. David Dellinger with Barbara Webster published a long remembrance of Sharlet for the magazine Liberation. A new GI underground paper, Next Step, published in Heidelberg, then West Germany, was dedicated to him, while Fred Gardner, in the definitive account of the 1968 Presidio Mutiny 27, The Unlawful Concert (1970), dedicated his book to "Jeff Sharlet, founder of Vietnam GI, dead at 27."

During past decades a number of scholars of the Vietnam anti-war movement have written about Sharlet and Vietnam GI in books and journals, including in recent years Andrew E. Hunt, The Turning: A History of the Vietnam Veterans Against the War (1999); David Cortright, Soldiers in Revolt: GI Resistance During the Vietnam War (reissued 2005); Bob Ostertag, People's Movements/People's Press (2006); and a new middle school text, The American Journey: Modern Times (2009).

Most recently, in 2012, the Jeff Sharlet Memorial Award, the first literary prize for military veterans, was inaugurated at the University of Iowa.

The most dramatic tribute has been the award-winning documentary, Sir! No Sir! (2005), on the Vietnam GI anti-war movement screened in theaters across the country and recently shown on Sundance Channel, co-dedicated to Sharlet, as the director David Zeiger put it, "for starting it all."

== See also ==
- GI Coffeehouses
- GI Underground Press
- List of peace activists
- Opposition to the Vietnam War
- Underground Press
- Vietnam War
