= Vietnam Veterans of America =

American veterans' organization

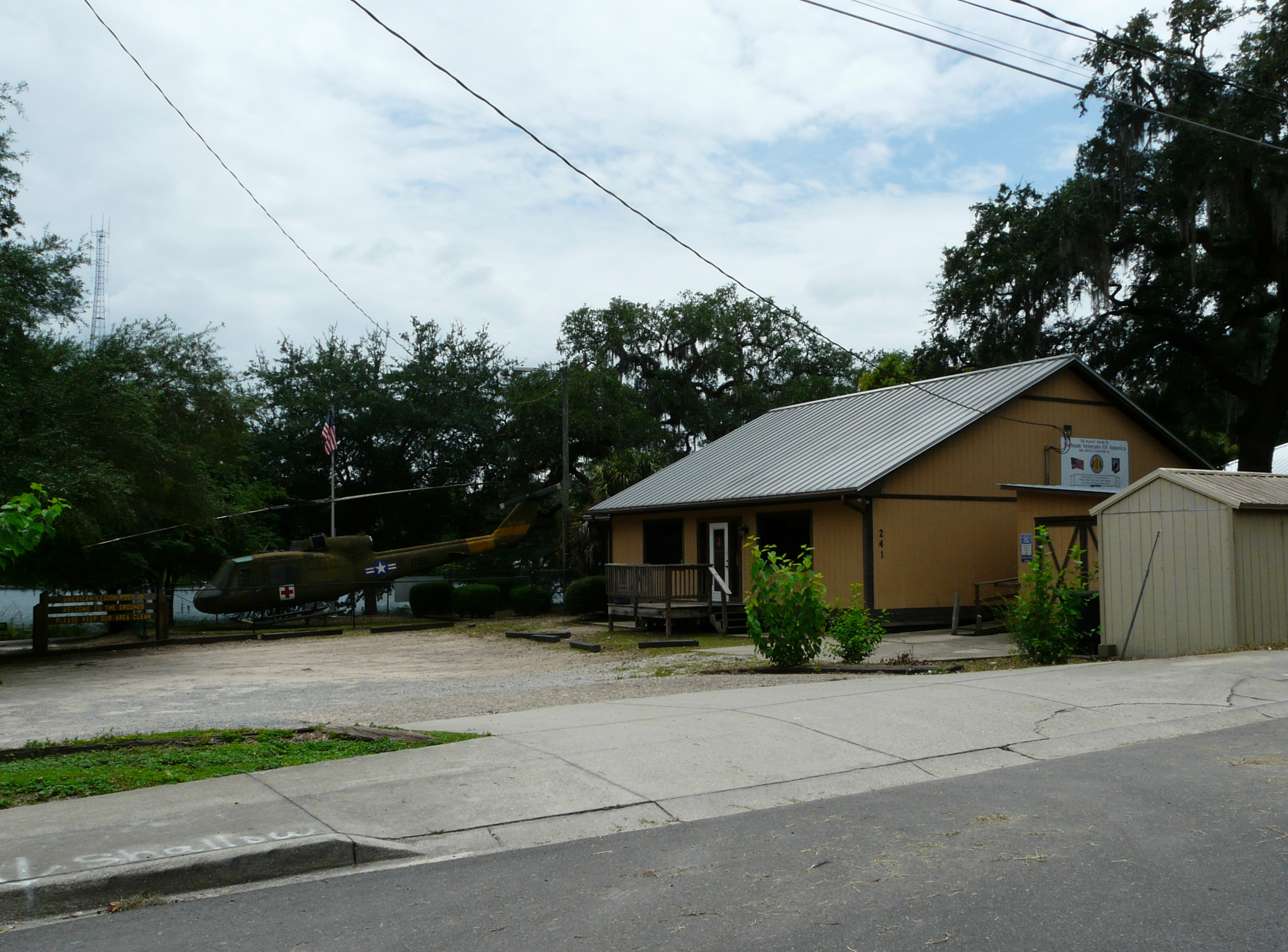
- VVA post in Tallahassee, Florida
- Founded: 1978
- Founder: Bobby Muller and Stuart F. Feldman
- Type: Congressionally chartered Veterans Service Organization (VSO)
- Purpose: Vietnam War Veterans
- Location: Silver Spring, Maryland
- Region served: United States
- Method: Education, Advocacy
- Website: Official website

Vietnam Veterans of America, Inc. (VVA) is a national non-profit corporation founded in 1978 in the United States that is committed to serving the needs of all veterans. It is funded without any contribution from any branch of government. VVA is the only such organization chartered by the United States Congress and dedicated to Vietnam War veterans and their families. The group holds a congressional charter under Title 36 of the United States Code.

== Advocacy ==
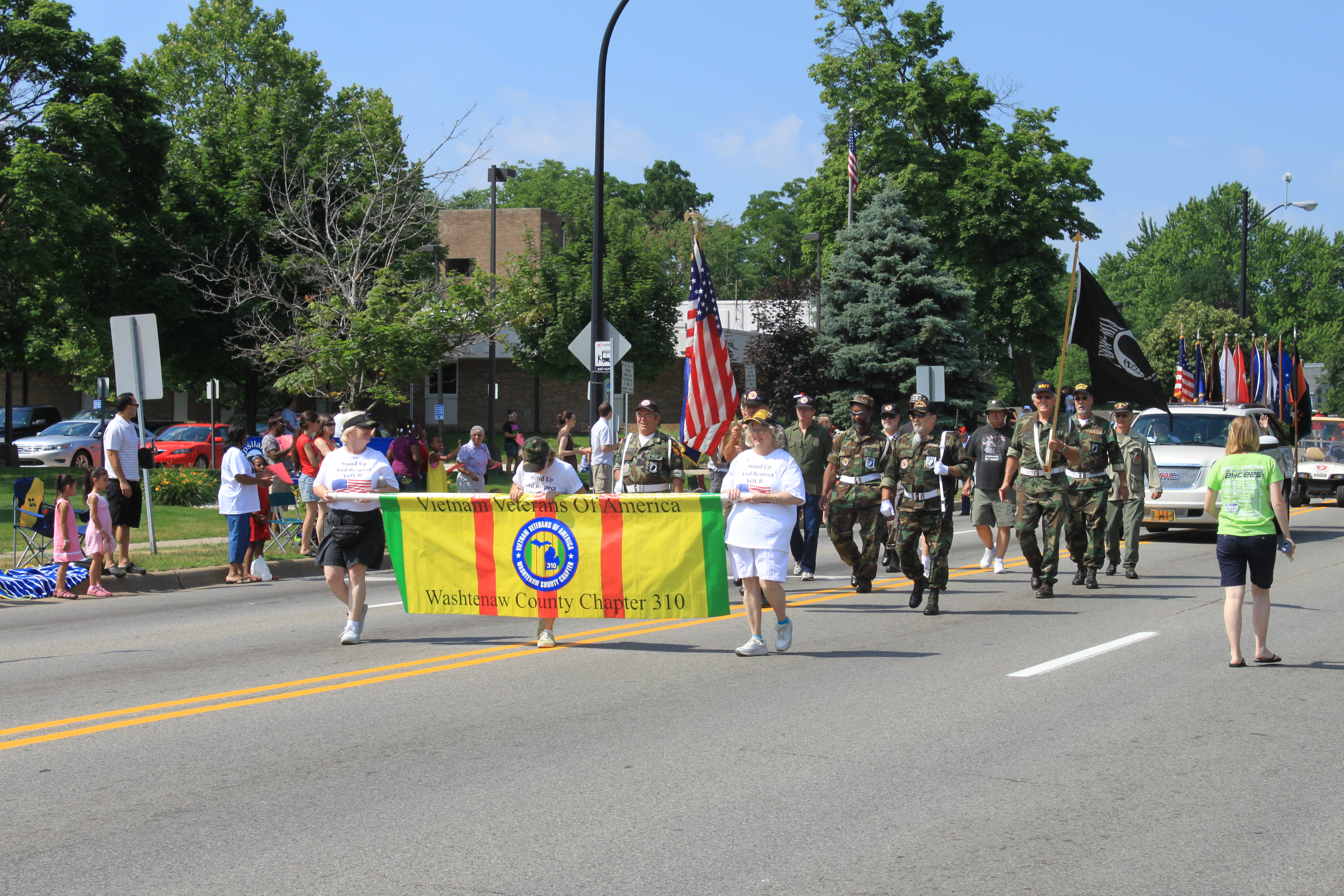
VVA members marching in an Independence Day Parade, Ypsilanti, Michigan

VVA aims to campaign on issues important to Vietnam veterans, to create a new identity for this generation of veterans, and to improve public perception of Vietnam veterans. The organization's main efforts concern:

- Government Relations Advocacy on veterans' issues
- National Task Force for Homeless Veterans
- Health care for veterans, including disabled veterans
- Issues pertaining to women and minority veterans
- National scholarship fund
- Assisting veterans seeking benefits/services from the government
- Organizing "Stand Downs" for the hard to reach homeless veteran in need of services.

VVA has organizing councils in 43 states, some 650 local chapters, and more than 85,000 individual members.

== History ==
In January 1978, a small group of Vietnam veteran activists came to Washington, D.C., searching for allies to support the creation of an advocacy organization devoted exclusively to the needs of Vietnam veterans. VVA, initially known as the Council of Vietnam Veterans, began its work. By the summer of 1979, the Council of Vietnam Veterans had transformed into Vietnam Veterans of America, a veterans service organization made up of, and devoted to, Vietnam veterans. Bobby Muller and Stuart F. Feldman were among the organization's co-founders.

Membership grew steadily, and for the first time, VVA secured significant contributions. The combination of the public's willingness to talk about the Vietnam War and the basic issues that it raised, as well as the veterans themselves coming forward, was augmented by the nation's dedication of the Vietnam Veterans Memorial in November 1982. The week-long activities rekindled a sense of brotherhood among the veterans and a feeling that they shared an experience that was too significant to ignore.

In 1983, VVA took a significant step by founding Vietnam Veterans of America Legal Services (VVALS) to provide assistance to veterans seeking benefits and services from the government. By working under the theory that a veteran representative should be an advocate for the veteran rather than simply a facilitator, VVALS quickly established itself as the most competent and aggressive legal-assistance program available to veterans. VVALS published the most comprehensive manual ever developed for veteran service representatives, and in 1985, VVALS wrote the widely acclaimed Viet Vet Survival Guide — over 150,000 copies of which are now in print.

The next several years saw VVA grow in size, stature, and prestige. VVA's professional membership services, veterans service, and advocacy work gained the respect of Congress and the veterans community. In 1986, VVA's exemplary work was formally acknowledged by the granting of a congressional charter.

Today, Vietnam Veterans of America has a national membership of nearly 90,000, with more than 650 chapters throughout the United States, Puerto Rico, the Virgin Islands, and Guam. VVA state councils coordinate the activities of local chapters. VVA places great emphasis on coordinating its national activities and programs with the work of its local chapters and state councils and is organized to ensure that victories gained at the national level are implemented locally.

== Presidents of VVA ==
- Tom Burke, 2025-
- Jack McManus, 2021–2025
- John Rowan, 2005–2021
- Thomas H. Corey, 2001–2005
- George C. Duggins, 1997–2001
- James L. Brazee Jr., 1991–1997
- Mary Stout, 1987–1991
- Bobby Muller 1983–1987; Executive Director, 1978–1983

== Publications ==
VVA helps to provide greater public awareness of the outstanding issues surrounding Vietnam-era veterans by disseminating written information on a continual basis.

== See also ==
- Vietnam Veterans of America Foundation
- Veterans for America
