= Carl Douglas Rogers =

American anti-war activist and writer

- Born: 1954
- Died: October 22 or 23, 2016; Los Angeles, California
- Cause of death: Cancer, possibly as a result of Agent Orange
- Organization: Vietnam Veterans Against the War
- Known for: Peace activism, co-founder and vice president of VVAW, patient advocacy

Carl Douglas Rogers (1954–2016) was an American anti-war activist, writer, Sunday School teacher, and cancer patient advocate. Briefly a chaplain's assistant in Vietnam, he publicly denounced the conflict, and in 1967, he became a co-founder and vice president of protest organization Vietnam Veterans Against the War.

Around 1967, Rogers was the subject of feature stories in the New York Post, The New York Times Sunday Magazine, Redbook, and Eye due to his religious condemnation of the war. He appeared in press conferences, radio, and television broadcasts.

Rogers founded Negotiations Now; worked as a correspondent in pacifist organization Clergy and Laity Concerned about Vietnam; founded Vietnam Veterans for McCarthy; served on Senator Eugene McCarthy's presidential campaign staff in 1968; and organized The Servicemen’s Link to Peace, which supported antiwar G.I. coffeehouses.

He marched alongside Martin Luther King Jr., likely as part of the National Mobilization Committee to End the War in Vietnam's 1967 anti-war demonstration in New York City titled Spring Mobilization to End the War.

He had 3 separate primary cancers and became a patient advocate, serving on the National Cancer Institute editorial board. He lived for 23 years after his first diagnosis.

== Biography ==
=== Early life ===
Carl Douglas Rogers was born around 1954, likely near or in his hometown of Chardon, Ohio. His parents' names are not stated in sources; his father was a newspaper columnist.

According to historian Andrew Hunt, Rogers was a "devout Christian from conservative small-town Ohio". He took pride in church activities and he was an award-winning square dance caller. At the time of his deployment, he was a Sunday School teacher at the Central Presbyterian Church in Manhattan.

=== Military chaplain ===
From March 1966 to April 1967, Rogers was an Army Specialist Fourth Class chaplain's assistant with the 1st Logistical Command at Cam Ranh Bay, Vietnam. His assignments involved listening to soldiers' stories "about the ravages of war", which led him to fundamentally oppose the conflict. While still in Vietnam, he filmed a "living letter" which he sent to Central Presbyterian, addressed to the Presbyterians of his congregation. He denounced the distortion of facts, dehumanization of Vietnamese people, and the idea of "kill ratios", which he found to be disturbing.

=== Antiwar activism ===
Upon his 1967 trip from Chardon to New York, Rogers immediately became involved with the peace movement. In 1967, Catholic magazine Commonweal described Rogers's public presence: "Rogers, who could step tomorrow into a Wheaties ad (he wears a crew-cut and teacher Sunday school at New York's Presbyterian Church) has been in the news since his return from Vietnam".

As vice president of VVAW, Rogers collaborated with president Jan Barry. Photographer and VVAW co-founder Sheldon Ramsdell stated, "Carl was a real wizard at public relations. He could organize a press conference in half a second", in contrast with Barry, who was "the articulate intellectual, always referring to Tom Paine and Thoreau."

In August 1968 in Grant Park, Chicago, Rogers witnessed police brutality during a rally in support of presidential candidate Eugene McCarthy. He recalled Chicago police storming the streets, beating bystanders with batons, as well as antiwar protesters, journalists and supporters.

Likely between 1968 and 1971, Rogers led the Help Unsell the War project, a response to American militant propaganda. Rogers commissioned and proliferated "a blizzard of anti-war ads" by "simpatico advertising agencies" which were published in newspapers, magazines, billboards, posters, radio and on TV. For example, a 1971 ad featured a testimonial from John Kerry, addressing Congress on behalf of the VVAW.

In April 1971, he attended Operation Dewey Canyon III, a peaceful protest during which hundreds of Vietnam veterans threw their war medals in trash heaps outside of the Capitol building. Recalling the event in 2007, he stated,

"The words and emotions that poured out were the most poignant and angry words I had ever heard in opposition to that dirty stinkin' rotten little war. Some scorched the air with their curses, said author Gerald Nicosia in his history of the Vietnam Veterans Movement, Home to War. It was, I know, the most justifiable and legitimate FUCK YOU! moment I will ever experience in my life. Fuck you, Lyndon Johnson! Fuck you, Robert MacNamara! Fuck you, Richard Nixon! Fuck you Henry Kissinger and all the other old men who send young men off to war! Take your goddamn medals and shove em! I walked away from that moment in tears, but never more proud to have been a part of the founding group of brothers who created VVAW. That protest was our finest moment in working to end a war the American people did not vote for and did not want."

In May 1975, he helped organize the VVAW's War is Over concert which had over 50,000 attendees. Performers included Phil Ochs, Joan Baez, Pete Seeger, Tom Paxton, Paul Simon, Patti Smith, Richie Havens, Harry Belafonte and Peter Yarrow.

=== Diagnosis and patient advocacy ===
In 1993, Rogers was diagnosed with kidney cancer at 39. He attributed this to Vietnam War herbicide Agent Orange as well as a "long family history of cancer", so he did not make significant life changes until he received a second diagnosis of colon cancer in 1997, as well as prostate cancer diagnoses in 1998 and metastates in 2010, 2012, and 2014. After his 1997 diagnosis, Rogers developed a "cancer consciousness", wherein he made significant lifestyle changes including quitting smoking, changing his diet, and joining the weekly Cancer Support Community support group in Santa Monica, California. As a patient advocate, he served on the National Cancer Institute editorial board, dealing with complementary and alternative medicine. Regarding his diagnoses, Rogers wrote:

"I fought for my life over cancer and ended up better off because of it...Even though my prostate cancer has metastasized three different times, making survival more the issue now than recovery – and more medical intervention a reality – I still remain one of those people who believe that cancer is the best thing that ever happened to me."

=== Later life ===
In 2007, he attended the 40-year VVAW reunion in Chicago, where he recounted stories about its rallies and foundation, including Operation Dewey Canyon III.

Circa 2015, Rogers was a communications consultant and writer. The same year, he expressed his intention to plan a commemorative trip to Vietnam in June 2017, in celebration of the VVAW's 50th anniversary.

On October 22 or 23, 2016, Rogers died of cancer in Los Angeles.

== See also ==
- American writer Jan Barry; friend, co-founder, and president of Vietnam Veterans Against the War
- American activist Al Hubbard; co-founder of Vietnam Veterans Against the War
- Opposition to United States involvement in the Vietnam War
- Presbyterianism in the United States
