= Carl Rogers (disambiguation) =

Carl Rogers (1902–1987), was an American psychologist.

Carl Rogers may also refer to:

- Carl Rogers (cricketer) (born 1970), English cricketer
- Carlrogers, minor planet
- Carl Rogers (politician), American politician
- Carl Douglas Rogers (1954–2016), American anti-war activist

== See also ==
- Carl Rogers Darnall (1867–1941), U.S. Army chemist and surgeon
