= W. D. Ehrhart =

American poet

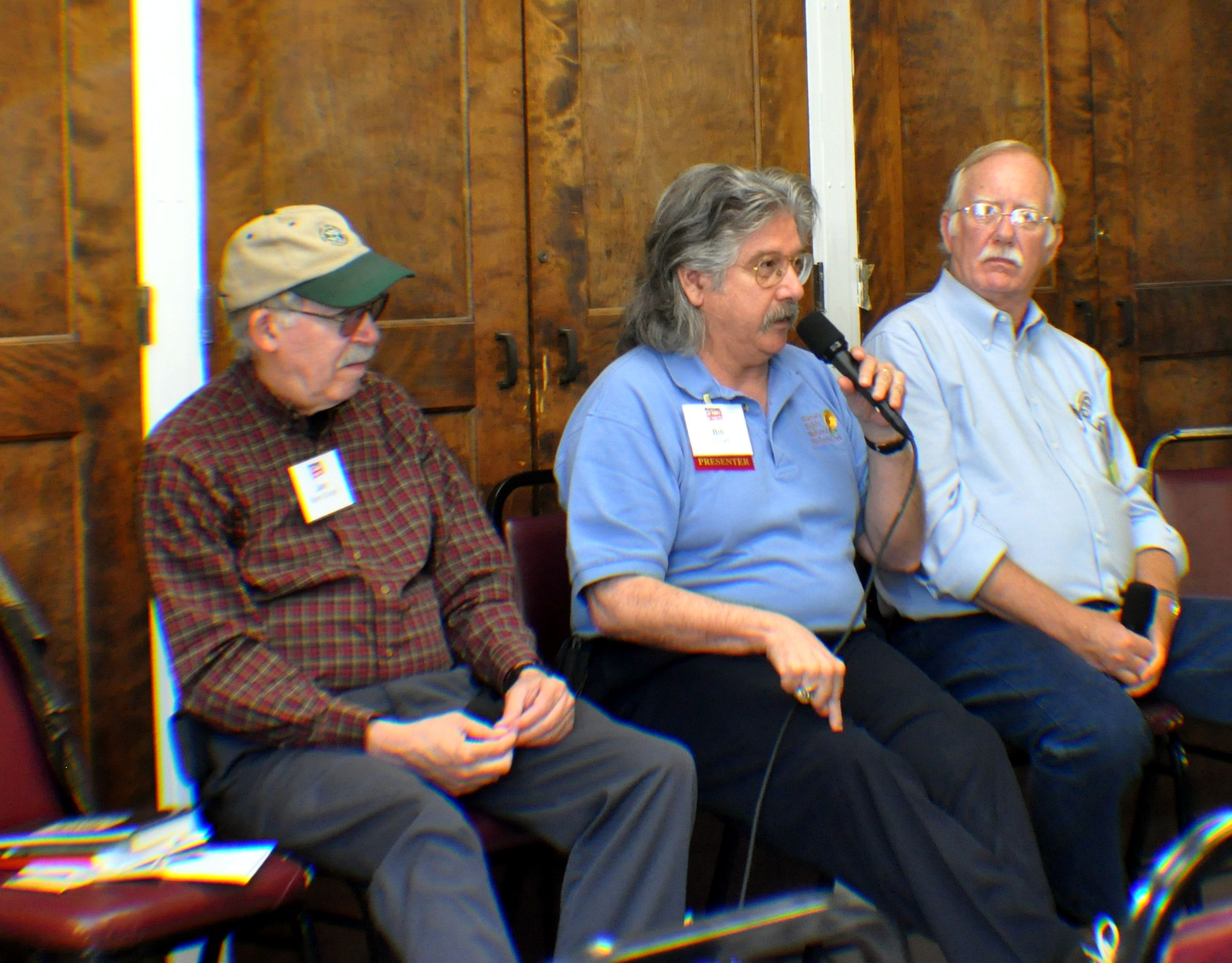
- Ehrhart (middle) in 2015
- Born: William Daniel Ehrhart; September 30, 1948 (age 78); Roaring Spring, Pennsylvania, U.S.
- Education: Swarthmore College; University of Illinois at Chicago; Swansea University
- Occupations: Poet, essayist
- Military career
- Allegiance: United States
- Branch: United States Marine Corps
- Service years: 1966–1969
- Rank: Sergeant
- Conflicts: Vietnam War; Tet Offensive; Battle of Huế
- Awards: Purple Heart
- Website: www.wdehrhart.com

William "Bill" Daniel Ehrhart (born September 30, 1948) is an American poet, writer, scholar and Vietnam veteran. Ehrhart has been called "the dean of Vietnam war poetry." Donald Anderson, editor of War, Literature & the Arts, said Ehrhart's Vietnam–Perkasie: A Combat Marine Memoir, is "the best single, unadorned, gut-felt telling of one American's route into and out of America's longest war." Ehrhart has been an active member of Vietnam Veterans Against the War (VVAW). He was a 1993 Pew Fellow in the Arts.

== Life ==
Immediately upon graduating from high school in June 1966, Ehrhart joined the United States Marine Corps, serving three years, including 13 months in Vietnam, from early February 1967 to late February 1968, being there during the Tet Offensive. Ehrhart, an infantry sergeant, was awarded the Purple Heart for injuries he received while fighting in Hue City. He subsequently attained his bachelor's degree at Swarthmore College, a master's degree at the University of Illinois at Chicago and (at the age of 52) a doctorate via the University of South Wales at Swansea University. Over the years, he has held a wide variety of jobs, from merchant seaman to newspaper reporter to high school teacher. From 2001 until his retirement in 2019, he was a master teacher of English and history at the Haverford School in Pennsylvania.

Ehrhart began writing when he was 15 years old, and has been writing more or less continuously ever since. His first published work, a poem about his alma mater Swarthmore College, appeared seven years later in the Chronicle of Higher Education, and the following year eight of his poems were included in Winning Hearts and Minds: War Poems by Vietnam Veterans. Exclusively a poet until he was almost 30, he has since written and published a wide variety of nonfiction prose.

The influence of Ehrhart's encounter with the Vietnam War can readily be seen in his writing; however, although he is known primarily as a "Vietnam War poet", his subject matter, in fact, ranges widely. He has written essays and articles on such topics as radio disc jockeys, tugboats on the Delaware River, the Internal Revenue Service, and a variety of modern and contemporary poets including William Wantling and Daniel Hoffman. His wife and daughter are major sources of inspiration for his poetry. His poetry also reflects "his respect for nature, his love of friends, his active engagement with the world around him, and his consternation at the human condition".

Ehrhart was featured prominently in the 1983 documentary Vietnam: A Television History, where he spoke at length about his experiences in Vietnam during the war.

In 2021, Between Shadows Press published a chapbook of poetry titled Wolves in Winter.

== Bibliography ==
=== Poetry ===
- Wolves in Winter, Between Shadows Press, 2021.
- Sins of the Father, 2010.
- Beautiful Wreckage: New & Selected Poems, Adastra Press, 1999.
- The Distance We Travel, Adastra Press, 1993.
- Just for Laughs, Viet Nam Generation & Burning Cities Press, 1990.
- The Outer Banks & Other Poems, Adastra Press, 1984.
- To Those Who Have Gone Home Tired, Thunder's Mouth Press, 1984.
- The Samisdat Poems, Samisdat, 1980.
- A Generation of Peace, New Voices Publishing Company, 1975.

=== Chapbooks: Poetry ===
- Praying at the Altar, Limited Edition, Adastra Press, 2017
- Sleeping with the Dead, Adastra Press, 2006.
- A Sort of Peace: Echoes and Images of the Vietnam War, Fox Photo Arts, 2005. (with photographer Don Fox)
- Greatest Hits: 1970–2000, Puddinghouse Press, 2001.
- Mostly Nothing Happens, Adastra Press,1996.
- Winter Bells, Adastra Press, 1988.
- Channel Fever, Backstreet Editions, 1982.
- Matters of the Heart, Adastra Press, 1981.
- Empire, Samisdat, 1978.
- Rootless, Samisdat, 1977.
- A Generation of Peace (Revised), Samisdat, 1977.

=== Prose ===
- The Madness of It All: Essays on War, Literature, and American Life, McFarland & Co., 2002.
- Ordinary Lives: Platoon 1005 and the Vietnam War, Temple University Press, 1999.
- Busted: A Vietnam Veteran in Nixon's America, University of Massachusetts Press, 1995.
- In the Shadow of Vietnam: Essays 1977–1991, McFarland & Company, Inc., 1991.
- Passing Time: Memoir of a Vietnam Veteran Against the War, McFarland & Co., 1989.
- Going Back: An Ex-Marine Returns to Vietnam, McFarland & Company, Inc., 1987.
- Vietnam-Perkasie: A Combat Marine Memoir, McFarland & Company, Inc., 1983.

=== Editor ===
- Unaccustomed Mercy: Soldier-Poets of the Vietnam War, Texas Tech Univ. Press, 1989.
- Carrying the Darkness: Poetry of the Vietnam War, Texas Tech University Press, 1989.

=== Co-editor ===
- Retrieving Bones: Stories & Poems of the Korean War, Rutgers University Press, 1999.(with Philip K. Jason)
- Demilitarized Zones: Veterans After Vietnam, East River Anthology, 1976. (with Jan Barry)

=== Anthologies ===
Poems and prose have also been reprinted in over 100 anthologies, textbooks, cultural studies, critical studies and other books. Recent examples include:

- American War Poetry, Goldensohn, ed., Columbia University Press, 2006.
- Perrine's Literature: Structure, Sound and Sense, 9th ed., Thomson Wadsworth, 2006.
- Perrine's Sound & Sense: An Introduction to Poetry, 11th ed., Thomson Wadsworth, 2005.
- Global Voices: Historical Inquiries for the 21st Century, John Wiley & Sons, Ltd. (Australia), 2005.
- Tough Times Companion, Culbertson, ed. VA Foundation for the Humanities, 2003.
- Fresh Water: Poems from the Rivers, Lakes, and Streams, Bosveld, ed. Pudding House, 2003.
- Proposing on the Brooklyn Bridge, Connors, ed. Grayson Books, 2003.
- The American Nation. Boyer & Stuckey, eds. Holt, Rinehart, Winston, 2001.
- Vietnam & Other American Fantasies, H. Bruce Franklin. University of Massachusetts Press, 2000.
- Stories from Where We Live: The North Atlantic Coast, Sara St. Antoine, ed. Milkweed Editions, 2000.
- Times of Change: Vietnam and the 60s, Perfection Learning Corporation, 2000.
- Ho Tro Thanh Nhan Vat Cua Toi, Ho Anh Thai. Nha Xuat Ban Thanh Nien (Hanoi), 2000.
- Portland Lights: A Poetry Anthology, LaMorticella & Nemirow, eds. Nine Lights Press, 1999.
- From Inquiry to Argument, Linda McMeniman. Allyn & Bacon, 1999.
- Daybook of Critical Reading and Writing, Claggett, Reid & Vinz. Houghton Mifflin, 1998.
- A Broken Heart Still Beats: After Your Child Dies, McCracken & Semel, eds. Hazelden, 1998.
- Our Mothers' Spirits: On the Death of Mothers and the Grief of Men, Blauner, ed. ReganBooks, 1998.
- Brooding the Heartland: Poets of the Midwest, M.L. Liebler, ed. Bottom Dog Press, 1998.
