= Jeff Sharlet =

Jeff Sharlet may refer to:

- Jeff Sharlet (activist) (1942–1969), American anti-war activist
- Jeff Sharlet (writer) (born 1972), American journalist, author, and academic
