= Veterans for Common Sense =

Organization advocating for US veterans

Veterans for Common Sense (VCS), founded in 2002, is a non-profit organization dedicated to advocacy on behalf of United States veterans who continue to serve their country by protecting the rights and interests of fellow citizens. Based on the pragmatic ideals of the American Patriot Thomas Paine, VCS was established "by service-minded war veterans who believe we, the people, are most secure when our country is strong and responsibly engaged with the world."

In 2006, Veterans for Common Sense merged for a period with Veterans for America, an organization partnered with the Vietnam Veterans of America Foundation; however, the two organizations separated again in 2007. Veterans for America continued VCS's focus on national security issues, with the added element of active humanitarian relief, mine mapping and other programs that address the consequences of war.

VCS focuses on four primary program areas: national security, civil liberties, energy policy and veterans healthcare and benefits. Activities have included large veterans' sign-on letters urging caution to the President before the 2003 invasion of Iraq and a lawsuit against the government seeking documents related to torture at the Abu Ghraib prison and the Guantanamo Bay detention camp. In addition, VCS has given frequent testimony before Congress about the need for mandatory full funding for U.S. Department of Veterans Affairs (VA) healthcare, the VA's broken disability claims process, and the VA's need for increased capacity for dealing with Gulf War Illness, traumatic brain injury (TBI), and post-traumatic stress disorder (PTSD) and mental health patients.

VCS's current director is Anthony Hardie, a former state veterans agency official and former Congressional staff member. He succeeded previous Executive Directors Paul Sullivan (2006-2012), a former project manager at the U.S. Department of Veterans Affairs, and Charles Sheehan-Miles (2003-2006), a former Gulf War-related non-profit executive.
