= Al Hubbard (activist) =

American activist (born 1936)

Alfred H. Hubbard
- Born: 1936 (age 89–90)
- Military career
- Allegiance: United States of America
- Branch: United States Air Force
- Service years: 1952–1966
- Rank: Staff Sergeant
- Units: 7th Air Transport Squadron
- Awards: Korean Service Medal, United Nations Medal, National Defense Medal, four Good Conduct Medals, Air Force Longevity Service Award, Air Force Unit Award and Air Force Expeditionary Medal
- Other work: Executive Secretary of VVAW

Alfred H. Hubbard is a U.S. Air Force veteran of the Korean War, anti-war and civil rights activist, former executive secretary of Vietnam Veterans Against the War and poet.

He grew up in Brooklyn, New York, and entered the Air Force planning to make it his career. He was forced to take an early retirement in 1966 after suffering an injury during a plane crash. After leaving the service, he enrolled at the University of Washington and earned an undergraduate degree.

== Life ==
=== Military ===
Hubbard enlisted in the United States Air Force in October 1952, reenlisted twice and was honorably discharged after 14 years of service. At the time of his discharge, he was an instructor/ flight engineer on C-124 Globemaster with the 7th Air Transport Squadron, McChord Air Force Base, Tacoma, Washington. Hubbard was awarded a Korean Service Medal, United Nations Medal, National Defense Medal, four Good Conduct Medals, Air Force Longevity Service Award, Air Force Unit Award and Air Force Expeditionary Medal. He was a flight engineer with the 22nd Troop Carrier Squadron at Tachikawa Air Force Base, Japan.

Hubbard was injured in a military plane crash and is registered with the VA with a service-connected disability rating of 60 per cent.

=== Anti-war and civil rights activism ===
In the fall of 1969, Hubbard joined the Vietnam Veterans Against the War, and became an active organizer for the group.

During the publicity generated by the April, 1971 anti-war protest march on Washington DC, Hubbard made claims about his rank during interviews that he later admitted were false. He was introduced on Meet the Press as a decorated Air Force captain who had spent two years in South Vietnam. After receiving a tip that Hubbard was a sergeant and not a captain, NBC contacted Hubbard about the discrepancy. Hubbard admitted to lying about being an officer, and publicly acknowledged it when he appeared on the Today Show the following morning. Frank Jordan, then Washington Bureau Chief of NBC News, recalls Hubbard's explanation for why he claimed to be an officer, "He was convinced no one would listen to a black man who was also an enlisted man."

William Overend in the National Review reported that a Defense Department news release stated: "Alfred H. Hubbard entered the Air Force in October 1952, re-enlisted twice and was honorably discharged in October 1966, when his enlistment expired. At the time of his discharge he was an instructor flight engineer on C-123 aircraft with the 7th Air Transport Squadron, McCord (sic) Air Force Base, Tacoma, Washington. There is no record of any service in Vietnam, but since he was an air crew member he could have been in Vietnam for brief periods during cargo loading, unloading operations or for crew rest purposes. His highest grade held was staff sergeant." Defense Department officials stressed it was still possible Hubbard could have served in Vietnam, flying in and out from Tacoma.

Historian and author of Home to War: A History of the Vietnam Veteran's Movement, Gerald Nicosia commented on the Hubbard military record controversy:

... service people doing covert missions, such as rangers going across the border in Laos, into North Vietnam, etc., never had those actions put into their records. Al Hubbard was on similar covert missions, flying in a supply plane to the French when they were fighting the Viet Minh in the fifties. It doesn't surprise me that those flights were not in his record. He did lie about being an officer, when he was a career sergeant, because the press kept paying more attention to his co-leader John Kerry, a decorated officer. Also, Hubbard never claimed to have been wounded in combat; his back was hurt when his plane crashed on a runway. When I interviewed him in 1992, he was on medical disability from the Air Force.

== See also ==
- American writer Jan Barry; principal founder and first president of Vietnam Veterans Against the War
- American writer Carl Douglas Rogers; co-founder and vice president of Vietnam Veterans Against the War
- Opposition to United States involvement in the Vietnam War
