= Charles Sheehan-Miles =

American writer and veterans' advocate

Charles Sheehan-Miles (born Atlanta, Georgia, United States, 1971) is an American writer and veterans' advocate.

Sheehan-Miles grew up in Atlanta. He served in the United States Army in the 1991 Persian Gulf War as a tank crewman in the 24th Infantry Division and was decorated for valor for helping rescue fellow tank crewmen from a burning tank during the Battle of Rumaila.

After the Gulf War, he became affiliated with numerous advocacy organizations, including serving as executive director of the National Gulf War Resource Center, as executive director of the Nuclear Policy Research Institute (an organization founded by Helen Caldicott), as a board member at the Education for Peace in Iraq Center and as the founder/executive director of Veterans for Common Sense.

He is the author of multiple novels:

- Prayer at Rumayla (2001) (ISBN 978-0979411403), released under a creative commons license in 2007.
- Republic: A Novel of America's Future (2007) (ISBN 9780979411427)
- Insurgent: Book 2 of America's Future (2012)
- Just Remember to Breathe (2012)
- A Song for Julia (2012)
- The Last Hour (2013)
- Nocturne (2013) (with Andrea Randall)
- Falling Stars (2013)
- Girl of Lies (2013)
- Girl of Rage (2014)
- Girl of Vengeance (2014)

Several of his novels have been translated into multiple languages.
