= E. K. Hunt =

External image
- Photo of E. K. Hunt

Emery Kay Hunt (born November 13, 1937), better known as E. K. Hunt or Kay Hunt, is an American economist. He is an Emeritus Professor of Economics at the University of Utah.

== Life and academic contribution ==
He was born in Blanding, Utah, the son of Emery Rulond Hunt (1914–1994) and Minerva Kartchner (b. 1917). He has one brother and four sisters. Hunt has two children, Jeff Hunt and Andrew Hunt. Andrew is a professor of history at the University of Waterloo.

E. K. Hunt received his bachelor's degree in 1961 and his Ph.D. in 1968 from the University of Utah. He has taught at five universities including the University of California, Riverside from 1969 to 1978, after which he joined the faculty at the University of Utah. As his career progressed, E. K. Hunt's writings gained recognition for their incisive critique of economics and economic theory. Notably, his collaboration with Ralph C. D'Arge led to the publication of "Environmental Pollution, Externalities, and Conventional Economic Wisdom: A Critique" in 1971. In this work, Hunt delved into the concept of externalities and contextualism, challenging orthodox economic perspectives on environmental issues.

Another significant publication was "Property and Prophets: The Evolution of Economic Institutions and Ideologies." Initially released in 1972, this seminal work, which has gone through multiple editions, including the seventh edition in 2003, provided a comprehensive analysis of the historical development of economic institutions and offered an alternative framework for understanding economic ideologies.

Together with Howard J. Sherman, E. K. Hunt authored "Economics: An Introduction to Traditional and Progressive Views." First published in 1972, this book presented contrasting perspectives on economic theory, incorporating progressive viewpoints often overlooked in mainstream economics.

From 1983 to 1989, he was chair of the University of Utah Department of Economics.

== First name ==
Genealogical sources give Hunt's first name as "Emery." Amazon.com gives Hunt's first name as "Emerson" for the March 1986 paperback edition of Economics: An Introduction to Traditional and Radical Views (ISBN 978-0-06-350353-3).

== Bibliography ==
- D'Arge, Ralph C.; Hunt, E. K. (1971). Environmental pollution, externalities, and conventional economic wisdom: a critique. University of California Riverside, Dept. of Economics.
- Hunt, E. K. (1971). Externalities and contextualism. University of California, Riverside, Dept. of Economics.
- Hunt, E. K. (1975). Instructor's manual (2nd ed.). Harper & Row. ISBN 978-0-06-363021-5.
- Hunt, E. K. (2003) [1972]. Property and Prophets: The Evolution of Economic Institutions and Ideologies (7th ed.). Armonk, New York: M. E. Sharpe. ISBN 978-0-7656-0609-9. Foreword by Robert Pollin
- Sherman, Howard J.; Hunt, E. K.; Nesiba, Reynold F.; Ohara, Phillip Anthony; Wiens-Tuers, Barbara (April 2008) [1972]. Economics: an introduction to traditional and progressive views (7th ed.). Armonk, New York: M. E. Sharpe. ISBN 978-0-7656-1668-5. Foreword by Robert Pollin. Editions of this book prior to 2008 used the title Economics: an introduction to traditional and radical views
- Hunt, E. K.; Sherman, Howard J. (1972). Study guide to accompany Economics, an introduction to traditional and radical views. Harper & Row. ISBN 978-0-06-040477-2.
- Hunt, E. K.; Schwartz, Jesse G., eds. (1973-01-30). A critique of economic theory: selected readings. Penguin. ISBN 978-0-14-080641-0.
- Hunt, Emery K.; Sherman, Howard J. (1984) [1974]. Ökonomie aus traditioneller und radikaler Sicht, Volume 1 [Economics from traditional and radical views, Volume 1] (in German) (3rd ed.). Königstein im Taunus (Germany): Athenäum Verlag. ISBN 978-3-7610-5008-8.
- Uma Introducao a Moderna Teoria Microeconomica by E. K. Hunt and H. J. Sherman (1977)
- Macroeconomia – O Enfoque Tradicional by E. K. Hunt and Howard J. Sherman (1977)
- Socialist Revolution No. 32 (Vol.7, No. 2) March – April, 1977 by E. K. Hunt. Et al. and Socialist Review Collective (1977)
- Hunt, E. K.; Sherman, Howard (1978). Economia politica [Political Economics] (in Italian). Turin (Italy): Bollati Boringhieri. ISBN 978-88-339-5224-6.
- Hunt, E. K.; 최완규[Choi Wan Gyu] (1979). 소유의역사 [The history of ownership] (in Korean). Seoul, Korea: 새밭 [Saebat].
- Hunt, E. K.; 邊衡尹; 金成九; 金洋和 (1982). Kyŏngje sasangsa/경제사상사 [Economic Thought] (in Korean). Seoul, Korea: 풀빛 [Pulbit Publishing Company].
- Hunt, E. K. (1987). De ekonomiska ideologiernas utveckling [The Evolution of Economic Ideologies] (in Swedish). Storken. ISBN 978-91-86152-08-6.
- Hunt, E. K.; Glick, Mark (1990-04-17) [1987]. "Transformation Problem". In Eatwell, John; Milgate, Murray; Newman, Peter (eds.). Marxian economics: the New Palgrave. New York City: W. W. Norton & Company. pp. 356–362. ISBN 978-0-393-95860-7. An essay.
- Kanth, Rajani Kannepalli; Hunt, E. K. (1991). Hunt, E. K. (ed.). Explorations in political economy: essays in criticism. Lanham, Maryland: Rowman & Littlefield. ISBN 978-0-8476-7617-0.
- Hunt, E. K. (2002). Takāmul nihādʹhā va Īdʻiūlūzhīʹhāī iqitṣādī: mālkiyat va risālat. Tehran: Āgah. ISBN 978-964-329-035-1.
- Hunt, E. K.; Günay, Müfit (2005). İktisadi düşünce tarihi [History of Economic Thought] (in Turkish). Dost. ISBN 978-975-298-171-3.
- Hunt, E. K. (2005). História do Pensamento Econômico: uma Perspectiva Crítica [History of Economic Thought: A Critical Perspective] (in Portuguese) (2nd ed.). Rio de Janeiro: Campus. ISBN 978-85-352-1570-0.
- Hunt, E. K.; Lautzenheiser, Mark (March 2011) [1979]. History of Economic Thought: A Critical Perspective (3rd ed.). Armonk, New York: M. E. Sharpe. ISBN 978-0-7656-2599-1. Foreword by Robin Hahnel

== See also ==
- Critique of political economy
- Economics
- History of economic thought
