= Jan Barry =

American poet, journalist, writer and activist

- Born: January 26, 1943 (age 83)
- Occupations: Poet, journalist, author, and activist
- Years active: 1965–
- Known for: Founder of VVAW, peace activism, Vietnam war poetry
- Title: VVAW President
- Term: June 1967 - June 1971
- Movement: Opposition to United States involvement in the Vietnam War
- Website: https://www.janbarry.net/

Jan Barry Crumb (born January 26, 1943) is an American poet, journalist, author, and activist. A Vietnam veteran and former National Officer of Vietnam Veterans Against the War, he resigned from West Point in 1964 "to become a writer and peace activist".

In 1967, he became the principal founder and first president of Vietnam Veterans Against the War.

American poet and scholar W. D. Ehrhart described Barry as an integral figure to Vietnam veterans' poetry, "not only for his own pioneering poems, but especially for his tireless efforts to encourage and promote the work of others". Other literary figures who commended Barry's works include Eleanor Wilner, Herbert Mitgang, Peter S. Prescott, and John Felstiner.

== Life ==
=== Early life and military ===
On January 26, 1943, Jan Barry Crumb was born in Ithaca, New York. He was raised in "a rural village in the Finger Lakes region" and had a "small town, Republican, patriotic upbringing". He graduated from Interlaken Central School in Interlaken, New York in 1961.

He attended the State University of New York College of Forestry at Syracuse University, but dropped out in May 1962 "to join the Army and see the world".

From December 1962 to October 1963, he completed a tour as part of the 18th Aviation Company in Vietnam. Upon his return to the U.S., he attended the U.S. Military Academy Preparatory School and was appointed to the U.S. Military Academy at West Point. After the 1964 Gulf of Tonkin incident, Barry found himself "disgusted" by the escalation of American presence in Vietnam. He resigned from West Point in November 1964, returned to active duty and was discharged from his Army enlistment in May 1965. Journalist Nick Medvecky notes this was because Barry did not agree with the American response during the Vietnam conflict.

In May 1963, he had witnessed a Buddhist anti-war protest in Nha Trang, and found himself appalled that the Saigon government "would turn loose tanks and machine guns and barbed wire all over the country".

American journalist Gerald Nicosia describe Barry's philosophical conflict with the war. He claimed Barry "did not yet know there was an American peace movement, but when he got out of the military, he went in search of what he called 'some other way'".

Concerning this time, Barry has stated, "Before I met these other fuming former soldiers, upset sailors, angry airmen and mad Marines, I was a lonely voice of seething outrage"; he stated that he was "mad as hell, but nobody would listen".

He sent a two-page polite dissenting letter to the editor, in response to a New York Times war dispatch that he felt incited outrage. Barry received a two-page reply in which the editor defended the war policy. After this, Barry sent his war medals with a "furious letter of protest" to New York senator Robert F. Kennedy; he received an unsigned letter returning the medals and stating that Kennedy could not accept them. The same occurred upon Barry mailing his medals and a letter to Secretary of Defense Robert McNamara at The Pentagon. Barry expected to be berated or called back to active duty, but he received no response.

=== Early career and peace demonstrations ===
After resigning from his military career, Barry became inspired by civil rights demonstrations, including the 1965 Selma to Montgomery marches. He lived in New Jersey initially, working for The Bergen Record newspaper. Moving to Manhattan in 1967, he worked in the New York Public Library's main branch as a file clerk.

In March 1967, Barry heard his coworkers discussing an April demonstration to be held outside of the United Nations. During this demonstration, Barry met peace activist, stage director, and founder of Eccentric Circles Theatre, Paula Kay Pierce. The National Mobilization Committee to End the War in Vietnam's anti-war demonstration in New York City was titled Spring Mobilization to End the War. The April 15 demonstration had 400,000 attendees, marching from Central Park to the United Nations, with speakers including Martin Luther King Jr., Harry Belafonte, James Bevel, and Dr. Benjamin Spock.

During the march, Barry "took his place among [the veterans], at the very front of the parade" and was nervous about the possibility of snipers and counterdemonstrators. However, no such violence occurred. Barry hoped to keep in touch with the "large contingent of veterans", but they "scattered into the crowd" at the conclusion of the march. It took a month and a half for Barry to track down veterans to form an organization based on the banner they held.

=== Peace activism and VVAW ===
On June 1, 1967, Barry invited five of these veterans to his apartment to found a new anti-war organization. He became its president, and scouted new members, including Carl Douglas Rogers, whom he telephoned following Rogers's press conference denouncing his time in the war. Rogers became the vice president of VVAW.

In September 5 and 6 (Labor Day Weekend) 1970, Barry and Pierce (his future wife) participated in Operation RAW (Rapid American Withdrawal), a three-day protest march from Morristown, New Jersey to Valley Forge National Park, after which a mass rally was held. Over 200 veterans marched, and 1,500 attended the mass rally.

=== Mann v. Ford ===
In 2005, Jan Barry was a reporter at The Record when he investigated the Ford Motor Company's pollution of the Ringwood Mines landfill site. Together with the Ramapough Lenape, Barry exposed the toxic waste dumping done by the Ford company. This began the "battle of the Ramapough Indians in a bid to secure a healthier future for their children in the face of alleged atrocities committed by the Ford Corporation and the EPA". This culminated in Mann V. Ford, a documentary film about the Ramapough Lenape Tribe's lawsuit of the Ford Motor Company.

=== Poetry and later life ===
His poems were published in The New York Times, A People and A Nation: A History of the United States (1983), and Winning Hearts and Minds: War Poems by Vietnam Veterans (1972).

In 2003, the Silurians Press Club awarded Barry with the Community Service Award.

In 2011, he appeared in Mann V. Ford, a documentary detailing the 1975 lawsuit in which Barry had been a reporter.

In 2013, Barry took part in a reading and discussion at Hendrix College in Arkansas.

In 2021, he appeared in American director Talia Lugacy's film This Is Not a War Story (2021).

== Selected works ==
- A Citizen's Guide to Grassroots Campaigns (2000)
- Earth Songs II: Poems of Love, Loss and Life (2018)
- Waging Art: Tackling Grief and Trauma with Creative Arts (2023)

== See also ==
- American writer Carl Douglas Rogers; friend, co-founder, and vice president of Vietnam Veterans Against the War
- American activist Al Hubbard; co-founder of Vietnam Veterans Against the War
- Opposition to United States involvement in the Vietnam War
