= Vietnam Veterans Against the War =

American nonprofit organization

- Insignia designed by co-founder Jan Barry; a response to the logo of the Military Assistance Command Vietnam
- Abbreviation: VVAW
- Formation: June 1, 1967; 59 years ago
- Founder: Jan Barry; Sheldon Ramsdell; David Braum; John Talbot; Art Blank; Steve Greene; Frank "Rocky" Rocks
- Founded at: Fifth Avenue Vietnam Peace Parade Committee in New York City
- Location: New York City, United States of America
- Website: vvaw.org

Vietnam Veterans Against the War (VVAW) is an American non-profit organization founded in 1967 to oppose the United States policy and participation in the Vietnam War. VVAW is a national veterans' organization that campaigns for peace, justice, and the rights of all United States military veterans. It publishes a twice-yearly newsletter, The Veteran; this was earlier published more frequently as 1st Casualty (1971–1972) and then as Winter Soldier (1973–1975).

VVAW identifies as anti-war and has roots in the 1960s civil rights movement, though its members are not necessarily pacifists or civil rights activists. Membership has varied greatly, from almost 25,000 veterans during the height of the war to fewer than 2,000 since the late 20th century. The VVAW is widely considered to be among the most influential anti-war organizations of the American Vietnam War era.

== History ==
=== March origin ===
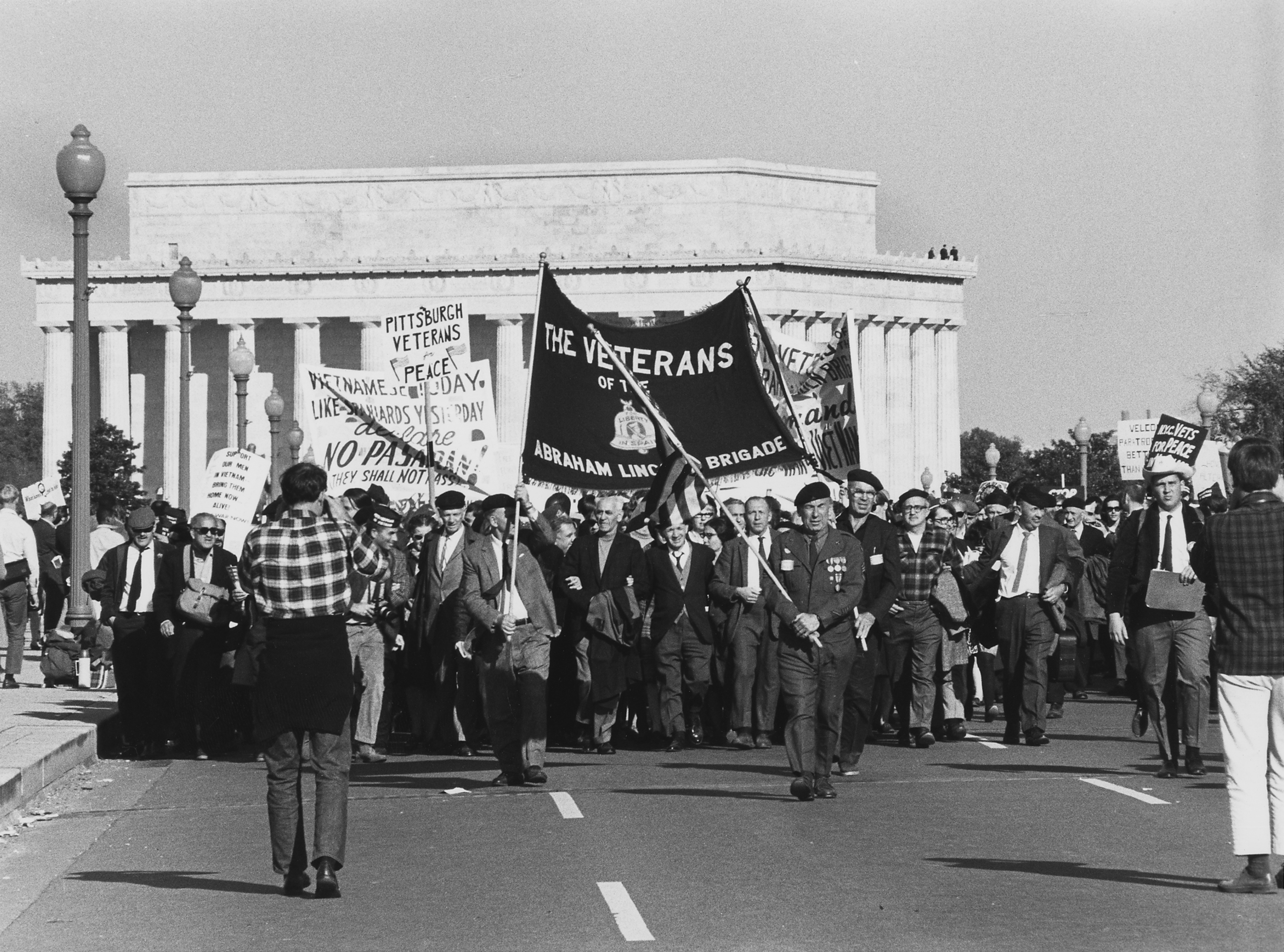
Veterans of the Abraham Lincoln Brigade on the Memorial Bridge in Washington, D.C., October 1967

The group originated as a slogan carried by protestors during New York City's 1967 Spring Mobilization march.

On April 15, 1967, the National Mobilization Committee to End the War in Vietnam staged an improvised anti-war demonstration in New York City titled Spring Mobilization to End the War. The march went from Central Park to the United Nations, with over 400,000 attendees. Speakers included Martin Luther King Jr., Harry Belafonte, James Bevel, and Dr. Benjamin Spock.

During this march, about 20 veterans of the Vietnam War gathered under an impromptu banner reading 'Vietnam Veterans Against the War.' This group included poet and author Jan Barry (a.k.a. Jan Barry Crumb), a West Point dropout who had served in the war as a radio specialist in an Army unit of a fixed-wing supply aircraft.

=== Founding ===
On June 1, 1967, six veterans met in Jan Barry's apartment to found a new anti-war organization, "at a time when the mainstream media was wholeheartedly ... promoting the war". This group likely comprised 24-year-old Jan Barry, Ron Kovic, Skip Delano, photographer Sheldon Ramsdell, and former Black Panther Al Hubbard. Other early members included David Braum, John Talbot, Art Blank, Steve Greene, Frank "Rocky" Rocks, and Stan Scholl.

The same year, 24-year-old veteran Carl Douglas Rogers held a press conference announcing his opposition to the war. Rogers had been a chaplain's assistant at the 1st Logistical Command at Cam Ranh Bay from 1966 to 1967. Barry telephoned Rogers immediately, after which the two became collaborators and lifelong friends. Barry convinced Rogers to join VVAW, after which Rogers would serve as its vice president. According to Andrew Hunt, Rogers "marched alongside Martin Luther King Jr., appeared on numerous radio and television programs, and became the subject of feature stories in the New York Post, The New York Times, Sunday Times Magazine, Redbook, and Eye".

By October 26 of that year, the VVAW had secured a desk and a telephone in the office of the Fifth Avenue Vietnam Peace Parade Committee in New York City.

Also in 1967, the VVAW bought an advertisement in The New York Times, titled "Viet-Nam Veterans Speak Out". It featured the signatures of 65 veterans. According to Barry, it "shook up [Secretary of Defense] McNamara, who had the signers investigated by the FBI," it "was read into the Congressional Record," and it "spawned similar ads in newspapers across the country," as well as attracting new VVAW members. The 1967 advertisement declared:

We believe that the conflict in which the United States is engaged in Vietnam is wrong, unjustifiable and contrary to the principles on which this country was founded. We join the dissent of the millions of Americans against this war. We support our buddies still in Vietnam. We want them home alive. We want them home now. We want to prevent any other young men from being sent to Vietnam. We want to end the war now. We believe this is the highest form of patriotism.

Beginning in 1968, the VVAW protestors would specifically wear military uniforms while denouncing the war. In 1997, Barry stated, "You can imagine the effect this had upon cops and lots of other people. Holy shit! These people are for real—a whole bunch of medals".

Despite its rapid foundation and initial growth, the organization's trajectory was difficult to maintain. This was in part due to the November 1968 election of Richard Nixon, whose presidency "created a discouraging atmosphere for dissent that lasted through most of 1969".

According to VVAW, its founders organized discussions for veterans on readjustment issues in 1970. This was a predecessor to readjustment counselling at modern Vet Centers. The group helped draft legislation for education and job programs, and assisted veterans with post-war health care through the United States Department of Veterans Affairs (VA) hospital system, including assisting victims of Agent Orange and other chemical agents. The VVAW advocated amnesty for war resisters.

Its insignia was designed by Barry, the first president of the organization. Barry appropriated the military insignia of the Military Assistance Command Vietnam, replacing its sword with a helmet and inverted gun. In so doing, Barry "transform[ed] war symbols into peace symbols" similarly to the Veterans for Peace and Donald Duncan.

Its creation coincided with the popularization of the G.I. Underground Press, wherein military personnel circulated publications satirizing and condemning the war.

=== Membership size ===
The fluctuating membership size has had varied estimates. The organization remained small until late 1969 when it gained several hundred new members. With the Nixon administration's decision to invade Cambodia and the Kent State shootings in 1970, VVAW's visibility increased, and they attracted new members, increasing from 1,500 to almost 5,000.

Membership passed 8,500 by January 1971, and thousands more flocked to the organization after Playboy Magazine was compelled to run a full-page VVAW ad in its February edition as part of a legal settlement with Jane Fonda. The national televised coverage of VVAW's week-long April 1971 protest in Washington, D.C., and smaller protests in subsequent months brought attention.

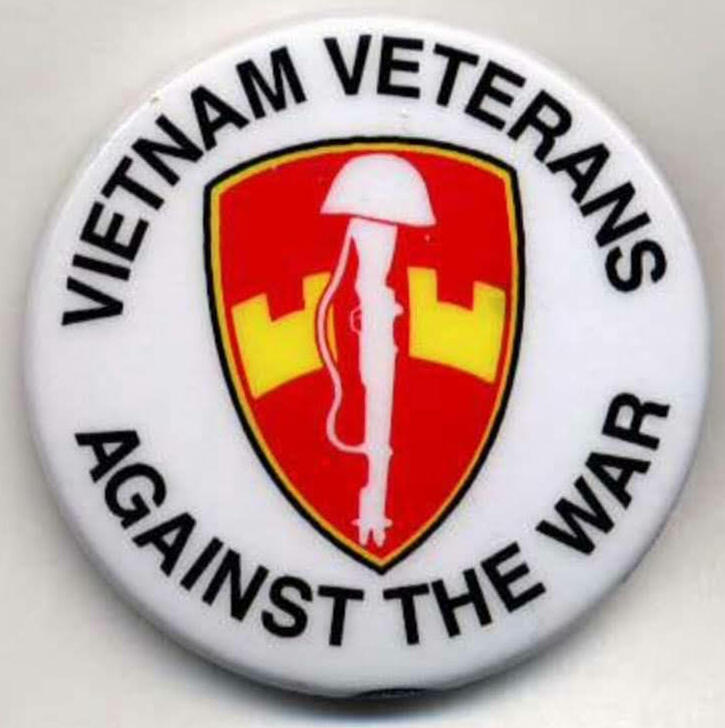
Vietnam Veterans Against the War Button

A Federal Bureau of Investigation informant within the organization noted in March 1971 that membership had grown from 1,500 to over 12,000 in the past four months. An article in Ramparts, that year said VVAW had at that time approximately 11,000 members and employed 26 regional coordinators.

Higher estimates exist, including a claim of 20,000 members for 1971. The organization has claimed a peak membership of over 30,000. Counting non-veteran supporters, VVAW had "roughly 50,000" members.

By 1972, negotiations at the Paris peace talks were in full swing, signaling the beginning of the end of the war, meaning the end of VVAW's primary mission. Membership in the organization declined, and the leadership began to consider broader purposes to support veterans. Membership requirements were relaxed, and political differences arose as new members fought with old about direction. By 1973 VVAW had several thousand members. With internal struggles still threatening the group, 2,000 members demonstrated in Washington, D.C., in July 1974, demanding universal amnesty for draft resisters and deserters, and universal discharge with benefits for all Vietnam veterans.

Historian Andrew E. Hunt concluded, "Detractors have always cited numbers when criticizing VVAW. At the pinnacle of VVAW's success in 1972, membership rolls listed almost 25,000 card carriers, or fewer than 1 percent of all eligible Vietnam era veterans. ... By emphasizing the low percentage of Vietnam veterans who paid dues to VVAW, opponents have sought to dismiss the significance and impact of the organization."

FBI notes on the NYC VVAW chapter; unknown year.

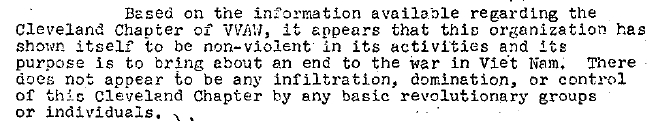
FBI notes on the Cleveland VVAW chapter; unknown year.

== Notable VVAW-sponsored events ==
=== Operation RAW ===
"A U.S. infantry company has just come through here. If you had been Vietnamese, we might have burned your house, shot you and your dog, raped your wife and daughter, burned the town and tortured its citizens."

-Text on pamphlet passed out by VVAW marchers to residents of Solebury, Pennsylvania

During the Labor Day weekend of September 4–7, 1970, Operation RAW ("Rapid American Withdrawal") took place. It was a three-day protest march from Morristown, New Jersey, to Valley Forge State Park in Pennsylvania by over 200 veterans. They were joined by members of "Nurses for Peace", MAN - Making a Nation and other peace groups. The march was designed to dramatize a Vietnam-type search and destroy mission as they passed through various towns including Bernardsville, Far Hills, Lamington and Whitehouse Station. Upon entering each town along the march, the group made sweeps, took and interrogated prisoners, seized property and cleared homes with the aid of previously planted "guerrilla theater" actors portraying civilians. The 86-mile-long march culminated in a four-hour mass rally at Valley Forge attended by more than 1,500 people. The honorary commander was retired Army Brigadier General Hugh B. Hester. A partial list of sponsors included United States Senators George McGovern and Edmund Muskie, Rep. John Conyers and Paul O'Dwyer. Sponsors scheduled to speak included Rep. Allard Lowenstein, Bella Absug, Rev. James Bevel, Jane Fonda, Mark Lane, Donald Sutherland and Vietnam Vets Joe Kennedy and John Kerry. Mike Lerner, and Army First Lt. Louis Font also spoke.

=== Winter Soldier investigation ===
In January 1971, VVAW sponsored the Winter Soldier Investigation to gather and present testimony from soldiers about war crimes being committed in Southeast Asia; they intended to demonstrate these resulted from American war policies. The event was boycotted by much of the mainstream media, although the Detroit Free Press covered it daily; its journalists began their own investigations to follow the testimony. They found no fraudulent participants or fraudulent testimony.

Veterans applying to participate in the investigation were asked if they had witnessed or participated in any of the following: search and destroy missions, crop destruction, and POW mistreatment.

This event was estimated to have cost the VVAW $50,000–$75,000. Funds were raised by several celebrity peace activists; actress Jane Fonda gained more than $10,000 in donations for this cause from 54 college campuses. Winter Soldier Investigation testimonies were read into the Congressional Record by Senator Mark Hatfield (R-OR). In 1972, VVAW continued antiwar protests, and released Winter Soldier, a 16mm black-and-white documentary film showing participants giving testimony at the 1971 hearing, as well as footage of the Dewey Canyon III week of protest events. This film is on limited distribution and is available on DVD.

=== Dewey Canyon III – Washington, D.C., April 1971 ===
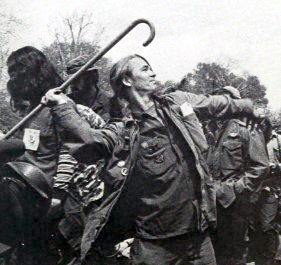
Operation Dewey Canyon III, where "800 Vietnam Veterans [Threw] War Medals on Capitol Steps Into a Pile Marked Trash", 1972

This peaceful anti-war protest organized by VVAW was named after two short military invasions of Laos by US and South Vietnamese forces. Dubbed "Operation Dewey Canyon III", it took place in Washington, D.C., April 19–23, 1971. Participants said it was "a limited incursion into the country of Congress." This week of protest events gained much greater media publicity and Vietnam veterans participation than earlier events.

Led by Gold Star Mothers (mothers of soldiers killed in war), more than 1,100 veterans marched across the Lincoln Memorial Bridge to the Arlington National Cemetery gate, just beneath the Tomb of the Unknown Soldier. Reverend Jackson H. Day, who had a few days earlier resigned his military chaplainship, conducted a memorial service for their fellows. He said:

Maybe there are some others here like me—who wanted desperately to believe that what we were doing was acceptable, who hung on the words of "revolutionary development" and "winning the hearts and minds of the people." We had been told that on the balance the war was a good thing and we tried to make it a good thing; all of us can tell of somebody who helped out an orphanage, or of men like one sergeant who adopted a crippled Vietnamese child; and even at My Lai the grief of one of the survivors was mixed with bewilderment as he told a reporter, "I just don't understand it ... always before, the Americans brought medicine and candy." I believe there is something in all of us that would wave a flag for the dream of an America that brings medicine and candy, but we are gathered here today, waving no flags, in the ruins of that dream. Some of you saw right away the evil of what was going on; others of us one by one, adding and re-adding the balance sheet of what was happening and what could possibly be accomplished finally saw that no goal could be so laudable, or defense so necessary, as to justify what we have visited upon the people of Indochina.

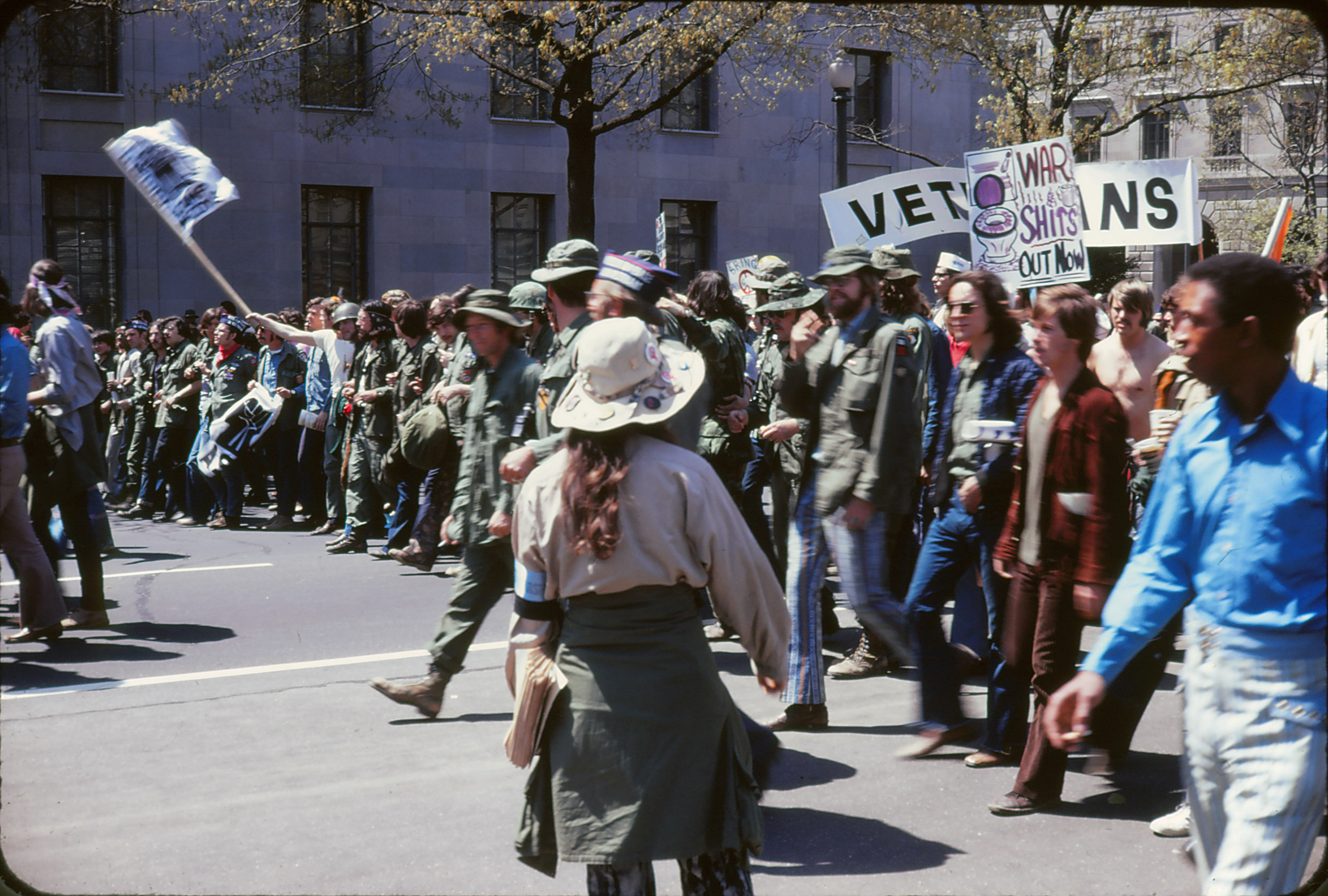
Veterans at a 1971 protest in Washington, DC

The gate to the cemetery had been closed and locked upon word of their impending arrival; the Gold Star mothers placed the wreaths outside the gate and departed. The march re-formed and continued to the Capitol, with Congressman Pete McCloskey joining the procession en route. McCloskey and fellow Representatives Bella Abzug, Don Edwards, Shirley Chisholm, Edmund Muskie and Ogden Reid addressed the large crowd and expressed support. VVAW members defied a Justice Department-ordered injunction against camping on the Mall and set up an installation. Later that day, the District Court of Appeals lifted the injunction. Some members visited their Congressmen to lobby against the U.S. participation in the war. The VVAW presented Congress with a 16-point suggested resolution for ending the war.

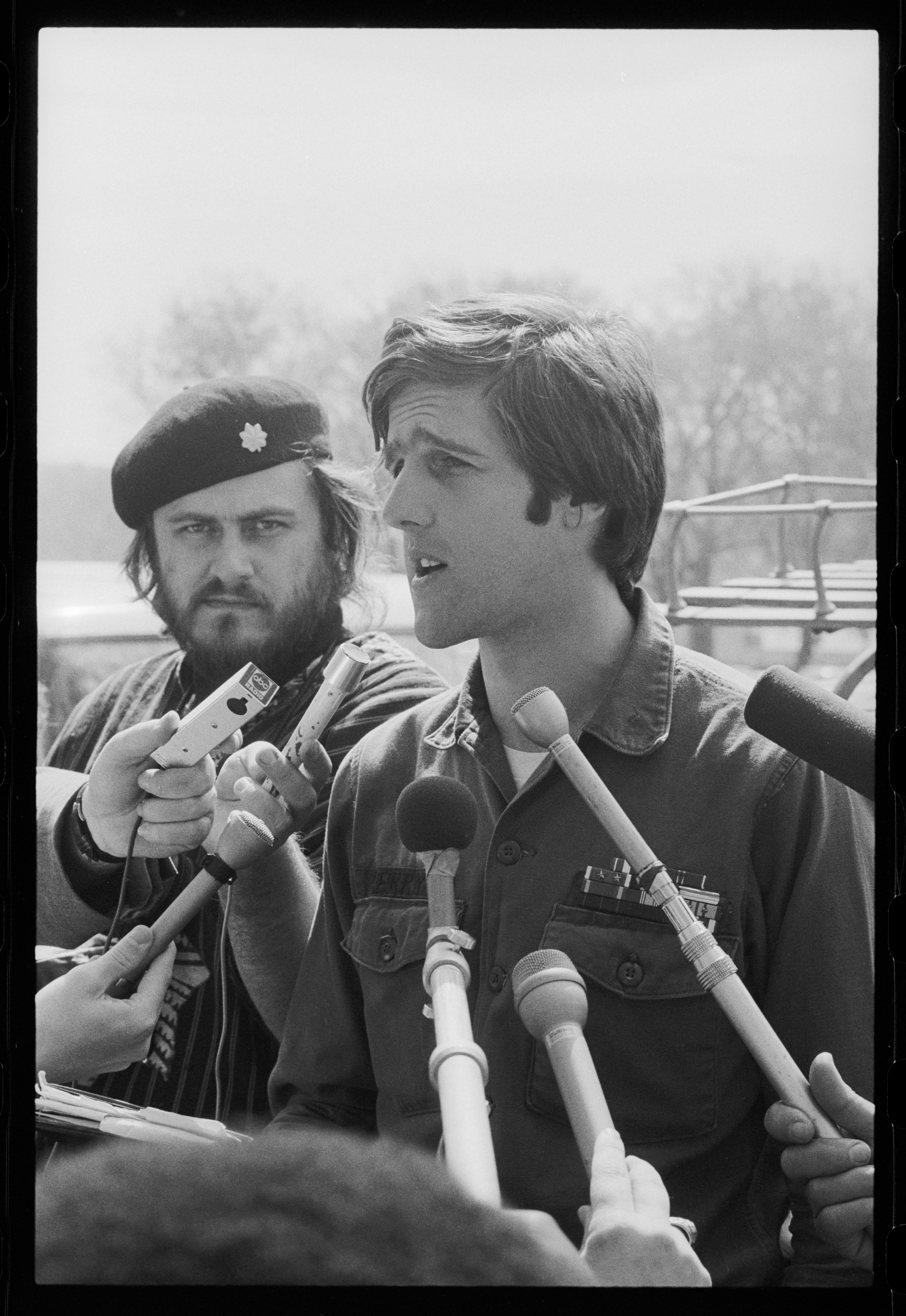
VVAW spokesman John Kerry in April 1971

On April 20, 1971, 200 veterans listened to hearings by the Senate Foreign Relations Committee on proposals to end the war. Other veterans, still angry at the insult to the Gold Star Mothers when they were refused entry to Arlington National Cemetery the previous day, marched back to the front gate. After initial refusal of entry, the veterans were finally allowed in. Veterans performed guerrilla theater on the Capitol steps, re-enacting combat scenes and search and destroy missions from Vietnam. Later that evening, Democratic Senators Claiborne Pell and Philip Hart held a fund-raising party for the veterans. During the party it was announced that Chief Justice Warren Burger of the United States Supreme Court had reversed the decision of the Court of Appeals and reinstated the injunction. The veterans were given until 4:30 the following afternoon to break camp and leave the National Mall. This was the fastest reversal of an Appeals Court decision in the Supreme Court's history.

On April 21, more than 50 veterans marched to The Pentagon, attempting to surrender as war criminals. A Pentagon spokesman took their names and turned them away. Veterans continued to meet with and lobby their congressional representatives. Senator Ted Kennedy spent the day speaking with the veterans. The guerrilla theater re-enactments were moved to the steps of the Justice Department. Many veterans were prepared to be arrested for camping on the National Mall, but none were, as park police defied orders to make arrests. Headlines the following day read, "Vets Overrule Supreme Court".

On April 22, a large group of veterans demonstrated on the steps of the Supreme Court, saying that the Supreme Court should have ruled on the constitutionality of the war. The veterans sang "God Bless America" and 110 were arrested for disturbing the peace, and were later released. John Kerry, as VVAW spokesman, testified against the war for two hours in front of the Senate Foreign Relations Committee before a packed room. The veterans lobbied all day on Capitol. A Washington District Court judge dissolved his injunction order, rebuking the Justice Department lawyers for requesting the court order and then not enforcing it. Veterans staged a candlelight march around the White House, while carrying a huge American flag upside down in the historic international signal of distress.

On Friday, April 23, more than 800 veterans individually tossed their medals, ribbons, discharge papers, and other war mementos on the steps of the U.S. Capitol, rejecting the Vietnam War and the significance of those awards. Among those that threw medals were Sen. John Kerry. According to internal White House memos between John Dean and Charles Colson, they had no idea how to handle the discarded medals and finally passed them on to the Congressional Medal of Honor Society. Several hearings in Congress were held that week regarding atrocities committed in Vietnam and the U.S. media's inaccurate coverage of the war. There were also hearings on proposals to end the United States' participation in the war. The vets planted a tree on the mall as part of a ceremony symbolizing the veterans' wish to preserve life and the environment.

Senators George McGovern and Mark Hatfield helped arrange at least $50,000 in fundraising for Dewey Canyon III. The VVAW paid $94,000 to advertise this event in the April 11, 1971 New York Times.

=== Walter Reed Memorial Service ===
In May 1971, the VVAW and former Army chaplain Reverend Jackson Day conducted a service for veterans at the Walter Reed Army Medical Center. Patients were brought into the chapel in wheelchairs. The service included time for individual prayers or public confession, and many veterans took the floor to recount things they had done or seen for which they felt guilt or anger. This was the last service performed by Day for nearly two decades.

=== Operation POW ===
Operation POW, organized by the VVAW in Massachusetts, expressed the imprisonment of Americans by the war years and honor for American POWs held captive by North Vietnam. Over the 1971 Memorial Day weekend, veterans and supporters marched from Concord, Massachusetts to a rally on Boston Common. They invoked the spirit of the American Revolution by spending successive nights at the sites of the Battle of Lexington and Concord and the Battle of Bunker Hill.

The organizers' request to camp on the historic Lexington, Massachusetts Green was declined by the town. The VVAW and residents who supported them camped there anyway. At 2:30 a.m. on May 30, local and state police awoke and arrested 441 demonstrators for trespassing. They were transported on school buses to spend the rest of the night at the Lexington Public Works Garage. Julian Soshnick, an attorney who represented the Boston Strangler, was among those who volunteered to represent the demonstrators. He worked out a deal with Concord Court Judge John Forte. The protesters later paid a $5 fine each and were released. The mass arrests caused a community backlash and eventually resulted in positive coverage for the VVAW.

=== Statue of Liberty occupations ===
On December 26, 1971, fifteen VVAW activists barricaded and occupied the Statue of Liberty for two days to bring attention to their cause. Simultaneous protests took place at other sites across the country, such as the historic Betsy Ross House in Philadelphia (for 45 minutes) and Travis Air Force Base in California (for 12 hours). VVAW members in California also briefly occupied the South Vietnam Government consulate in San Francisco.

In 1976, VVAW members occupied the Statue of Liberty a second time to bring renewed attention to veteran issues.

=== The War Is Over concert and peace rally ===
On May 11, 1975, the VVAW staged The War Is Over concert and rally in New York City Central Park's Sheep Meadow. The New York Times reported that the concert had 50,000 attendees, which the VVAW described as "peaceniks" (a play on beatniks).

Performers included Phil Ochs, Joan Baez, Pete Seeger, Tom Paxton, Paul Simon, Patti Smith, Richie Havens, Harry Belafonte and Peter Yarrow. Among its most prominent organizers was VVAW co-founder Carl Douglas Rogers. American photographer Allan Tannenbaum documented the event, and it was broadcast on WBAI.

== Extremist influence ==
=== Kansas City meeting ===
During a four-day series of meetings in Kansas City, Missouri, on November 12–15, 1971, Scott Camil, a radical VVAW southern coordinator, proposed assassinating the most conservative members of United States Congress, and other powerful opponents of the antiwar movement. According to interviews with VVAW members, Camil suggested "The Phoenix Project", named after the original Phoenix Program, CIA operations during the Vietnam War to assassinate the Viet Cong. Camil's Phoenix Project targeted the Southern senatorial leadership who were backing the war, including John Tower, Strom Thurmond, and John Stennis.

Camil later said:

I did not think it was terrible at the time. My plan was that, on the last day we would go into the [congressional] offices we would schedule the most hardcore hawks for last—and we would shoot them all. ... I was serious. I felt that I spent two years killing women and children in their own fucking homes. These are the guys that fucking made the policy, and these were the guys that were responsible for it, and these were the guys that were voting to continue the fucking war when the public was against it. I felt that if we really believed in what we were doing, and if we were willing to put our lives on the line for the country over there, we should be willing to put our lives on the line for the country over here.

The plan was voted down, although there's a "difference of opinion" as to how close the vote was. It is not known if John Kerry, a 2004 presidential candidate who was Secretary of State under President Barack Obama, attended this meeting. Kerry's campaign said he was not there and had already resigned from VVAW.

=== Revolutionary Communist Party involvement ===
In 1973, after months of heated debate, the VVAW changed its name to VVAW/WSO (Winter Soldier Organization), and opened its membership to non-veterans to increase its base. Members of Bob Avakian's militant Revolutionary Communist Party gained influential positions in the VVAW. This reached its peak in 1975, when the RU-controlled national office voted to remove members, expel chapters and place the organization into ideological uniformity. They later voted to dissolve themselves into the Revolutionary Union.

A reconstituted group of non Marxist members of the Vietnam Veterans Against the War filed and won a lawsuit prohibiting the RU dominated group from using the VVAW name, logos and materials. The RU group organization was renamed Vietnam Veterans Against the War Anti-Imperialist (VVAW-AI). Deep animosity still exists between the two organizations.

VVAW has survived the conflict with RCP and changes after the end of the war. Historian Andrew Hunt said it was "an ineffectual fragment of its former self. ... VVAW never ceased to exist. It split, dwindled, and underwent additional transformation. Yet it did not fold."

== Post-Vietnam War activities ==
By 1973, US combat involvement in Vietnam ended. VVAW changed its emphasis to include advocating amnesty for draft resisters and dissenters. President Jimmy Carter eventually granted amnesty in 1980.

VVAW members also worked to gain veterans' treatment and benefits for major Vietnam-related health conditions, namely, post-traumatic stress disorder and the effects of exposure to Agent Orange.

As early as 1970, VVAW initiated "rap groups" to help veterans readjust: these were venues for veterans to discuss troubling aspects of the war, their disillusionment, and experiences after returning home. They gained the aid of prominent psychiatrists Dr. Robert Jay Lifton and Dr. Chaim F. Shatan to direct their sessions. VVAW's work contributed to "Post-Vietnam Syndrome" being recognized in 1980 as post-traumatic stress disorder by the American Psychiatric Association in its Diagnostic and Statistical Manual of Mental Disorders. Such discussion groups are often used in the VVAW "rap group" treatment methods are the basis for treating PTSD today.

In 1976 VVAW/WSO made Still At War, a documentary on PTSD (PVS) and conditions at the VA. It includes discussions of the effects of the war on veterans, the impact of military records, Post Vietnam Syndrome and Post Vietnam Struggle. It was made by the Still At War film collective with assistance of The American Federation of Government Employees Local 1061, the American Veterans Movement, and patients of the Long Beach and Brentwood V.A. hospitals.

In 1978 Maude de Victor, a Chicago Veterans Administration caseworker, noticed a pattern in cancers and other illnesses suffered by Vietnam veterans. She linked those illnesses with exposure to herbicides such as Agent Orange, and its dioxin contaminants. VVAW led veterans organizations in the struggle to force the government to test, treat and compensate the victims of those poisons. Congress mandated a study of Agent Orange in 1979.

Veterans separately filed suit against the herbicide manufacturers, Dow Chemical and Monsanto, in 1982. Two years later the companies settled the suit for $180 million to compensate what at that time were more than 200,000 claimants.

Mainstream veterans groups had tended to be suspicious of Vietnam veterans who protested against the war, regarding them as "crybabies and losers" in general. They particularly thought the VVAW members were unpatriotic and anti-American. Vietnam Veterans of America was not founded until 1978 by VVAW member Robert Muller. In 1990 the American Legion and VVA joined the cause of Vietnam veterans, filing suit against the government for having failed to conduct the study ordered by Congress in 1979.

Several VVAW members moved on to prominent positions in society. In 1978 Bobby Muller co-founded the Vietnam Veterans of America. John Kerry was elected as Lt. Governor of Massachusetts in 1982, and as a US Senator in 1984. Ron Kovic wrote his autobiography, Born on the Fourth of July. It was adapted as a 1989 movie and won several Academy Awards.

Reunions are scheduled every five years for members and alumni; the 1992 event attracted hundreds of veterans to commemorate the 25th anniversary of the founding. VVAW continues to organize programs and fundraising events in support of veterans, peace, and social justice."

The 40th anniversary was held in Chicago on August 3–5, 2007.

== See also ==
- Concerned Officers Movement
- FTA Show - 1971 anti-Vietnam War road show for GIs
- Fort Hood Three
- GIs Against Fascism
- Myth of the spat-on Vietnam veteran
- Opposition to United States involvement in the Vietnam War
- Presidio mutiny
- The Spitting Image - book dispelling the myth of the spat-on Vietnam veteran

== Documentary films ==
- 1972 – Winter Soldier. Documentary directed by the Winterfilm Collective.
- 1973 – Operation Last Patrol. Directed by Frank Cavestani and Catherine Leroy.
- 1976 - Still At War. Documentary by the Still At War Film Collective.
- 2004 – Going Upriver: The Long War of John Kerry. Directed by George Butler.
- 2005 – Sir! No Sir!. Directed by David Zeiger.
