= John Rowan (Vietnam War veteran) =

American president of the Vietnam Veterans of America

- Born: September 18, 1945; Queens, New York City, U.S.
- Education: Queen's College; Hunter College
- Occupation: Civic leader

John Rowan (born September 18, 1945) is an American Vietnam War veteran and the sixth national president of the Vietnam Veterans of America (VVA).

== Early life, education, and military service ==
Rowan was born on September 18, 1945, in Queens, New York City. He was educated at the Brooklyn Technical High School, and he attended Baruch College but did not graduate. Instead, he learned Indonesian at the Defense Language Institute and Vietnamese in Washington, D.C., before serving in the Vietnam War.

In 1967, amid the Vietnam War, Rowan joined the U.S. Air Force Security Service as a linguist. He "flew in planes over North Vietnam with a team listening in on the enemy's communications and translating them into English to guide or warn American pilots."

After the war, Rowan attended Queen's College, where he earned a bachelor's degree in Political Science. He attended graduate school at Hunter College, where he earned a master's degree in Urban Affairs.

== Career and civic activities ==
Rowan spent his career in the public sector. He was an investigator for the New York City Comptroller's Office until 2002.

Rowan became a member of the Council of Vietnam Veterans, later known as the Vietnam Veterans of America, in 1978. He was a founding member of its chapter in Queens, New York in 1981. From 1995 to 2005, he was the president of the VVA's New York State Council from 1995 to 2005. Since 2005, he has served as its sixth national president. He has raised awareness about the high rate of PTSD among Vietnam War veterans. He has also worked with the Vietnamese Veterans Association to find missing U.S. veterans of the war who died on Vietnamese soil.

Rowan serves on the advisory board of the New York City Department of Veterans Affairs, where he represents Queens.

== Personal life ==
With his wife Mariann, Rowan resides in Middle Village, New York.

Preceded by Thomas H. Corey	President of Vietnam Veterans of America; 2005-present	Succeeded by incumbent
