= Veterans for America =

Advocacy organization

Veterans for America is "an advocacy and humanitarian organization that works with its affiliate group, the Justice Project to engage the American public in support of policies addressing the needs of veterans, those currently in the armed services, and victims of war overseas, and to develop initiatives to make the world more secure."

== Background ==
According to the Foundation Center's Philanthropy News Digest, Veterans for America is an outgrowth of the Vietnam Veterans of America Foundation, founded in 1980 by veterans Bobby Muller and John Terzano. The group merged with Veterans for Common Sense for a time in 2006, and the combined group was renamed Veterans for America in 2006.

The veterans' advocate Steve Robinson, a twenty-year Army Veteran and former Army Ranger, was the director of Veterans for America for a period. Robinson advocated on behalf of soldiers with post-traumatic stress disorder at Fort Carson in Colorado who had been pushed out of the U.S. military via administrative discharges for "personality disorders" (which, unlike medical retirements for PTSD, disqualifies them from receiving health benefits). As Veterans for America director, Robinson gave testified at congressional hearings and pressured the Government Accountability Office to investigate. Robinson also testified before Congress several times following the Walter Reed Army Medical Center neglect scandal in 2007; Robinson pushed to reduce long "the long wait times and bureaucratic tangles servicemembers faced as they waited for medical retirement after being injured in Iraq or Afghanistan." Robinson died in 2014.
