= Andrew Hunt (historian) =

- Born: 1968 (age 57–58); Calgary, Alberta, Canada
- Education: B.A., Ph.D.
- Alma mater: University of Utah
- Occupation: History professor
- Employer: University of Waterloo
- Children: 2

Andrew Emerson Hunt (born 1968) is a Canadian history professor, at the University of Waterloo in Canada. He is also the director of the Tri-University Graduate Program in History.

== Life ==
Hunt was born in Calgary, Alberta. He is a descendant of one of the founders of the University of Deseret (the original name of the University of Utah). At age one he was relocated to the United States with his American parents E. K. Hunt and Linda Hunt. Andrew has a brother, Jeff. Andrew Hunt's parents were active in the anti-war movement in the early 1970s. While a young boy, Hunt witnessed the California state convention of the Vietnam Veterans Against the War held in his family's backyard in 1972.

Andrew Hunt grew up around universities, as his father E. K. Hunt has taught at five universities. E. K. Hunt is an Emeritus Professor of Economics at the University of Utah.

Andrew Hunt was raised in California and Utah. On May 11, 1987, Hunt (then an undergraduate) was one of eight student activists protesting South African apartheid who practiced civil disobedience at a meeting of the University of Utah's Institutional Council. The students were demanding that the university divest all of its holdings in corporations having operations in South Africa. Four of the students were arrested; all eight were charged with misdemeanors by the university. However, the students' efforts were successful as the Institutional Council voted one month later to divest.

Hunt received his B.A. from the University of Utah in 1990. In 1997 he received his Ph.D. also from the University of Utah. His Ph.D. advisor was History Professor Robert Goldberg. Hunt began teaching at the University of Waterloo the same year.

Hunt is the author of several books (see below), and is a columnist for the Waterloo Region Record where he regularly comments on politics and world affairs. Hunt has said that his research and effort for writing his first book (The Turning: A History of Vietnam Veterans Against the War) was part of his own quest "to understand the environment and the society that swept my family away and broke us apart." He is currently writing a book on Ronald Reagan and Cold War culture in the United States in the 1980s. Hunt resides in Waterloo, Ontario. He is the father of Maddox and Aidan.

== Animal rights ==
Hunt is a vegan and a supporter of animal rights. Hunt has written:

For about two years, I had a Blog called Andrew's Tiki Lounge: Helping Canadians (and Anyone Else Who's Interested) Make Sense of the United States...

I discontinued Andrew's Tiki Lounge. My new Blog, titled "We're All Animals," is an animal rights and vegan blog. Because I believe that animal rights is one of the most important issues confronting humanity, I have decided to turn all of my Blogging attention to this matter.

== Bibliography ==
- Hunt, Andrew E. (2001-05-01) [1999]. The Turning: A History of Vietnam Veterans Against the War. New York University Press. ISBN 978-0-8147-3635-7. OCLC 40848421.
- Hunt, Andrew E. (2006-05-01). David Dellinger: The Life and Times of a Nonviolent Revolutionary. New York University Press. ISBN 978-0-8147-3638-8. A biography of the American radical David Dellinger.
- Hunt, Andrew E. (2010). Dahlia Boyz. Kitchener, Ontario: Blaurock Press. ISBN 978-0-9864924-1-9. A novella.
- Hunt, Andrew (2012). City of Saints. Minotaur/Thomas Dunne Books. ISBN 9781250015792.
  - Ellen Fagg Weist (December 4, 2012). "Former Utahn explores the mysterious heart of 'City of Saints'". Salt Lake Tribune.
- Walkowitz, Daniel J.; et al. (2009). Walkowitz, Daniel J.; Bender, Daniel E. (eds.). Social history of the United States, Volume 3. Santa Barbara, California: ABC-CLIO. ISBN 978-1-85109-911-5.
- Hunt, Andrew E. (2015). A Killing in Zion: A Mystery. Minotaur Books.
- Hunt, Andrew E. (2016-11-15). Desolation Flats: A Mystery. St. Martin's Publishing Group. ISBN 9781466870819.
- Hunt, Andrew E. (2021). We Begin Bombing in Five Minutes: Late Cold War Culture in the Age of Reagan. University of Massachusetts Press. ISBN 9781625345769.
- Hunt, Andrew E. (2023). Beatlemania in America: Fan Culture from Below. Bloomsbury Publishing. ISBN 9781350291560.

== See also ==
- E. K. Hunt - Andrew Hunt's father
- Vietnam War
- Legacy of Ronald Reagan vis-a-vis the Cold War
