= Bobby Muller =

American peace advocate

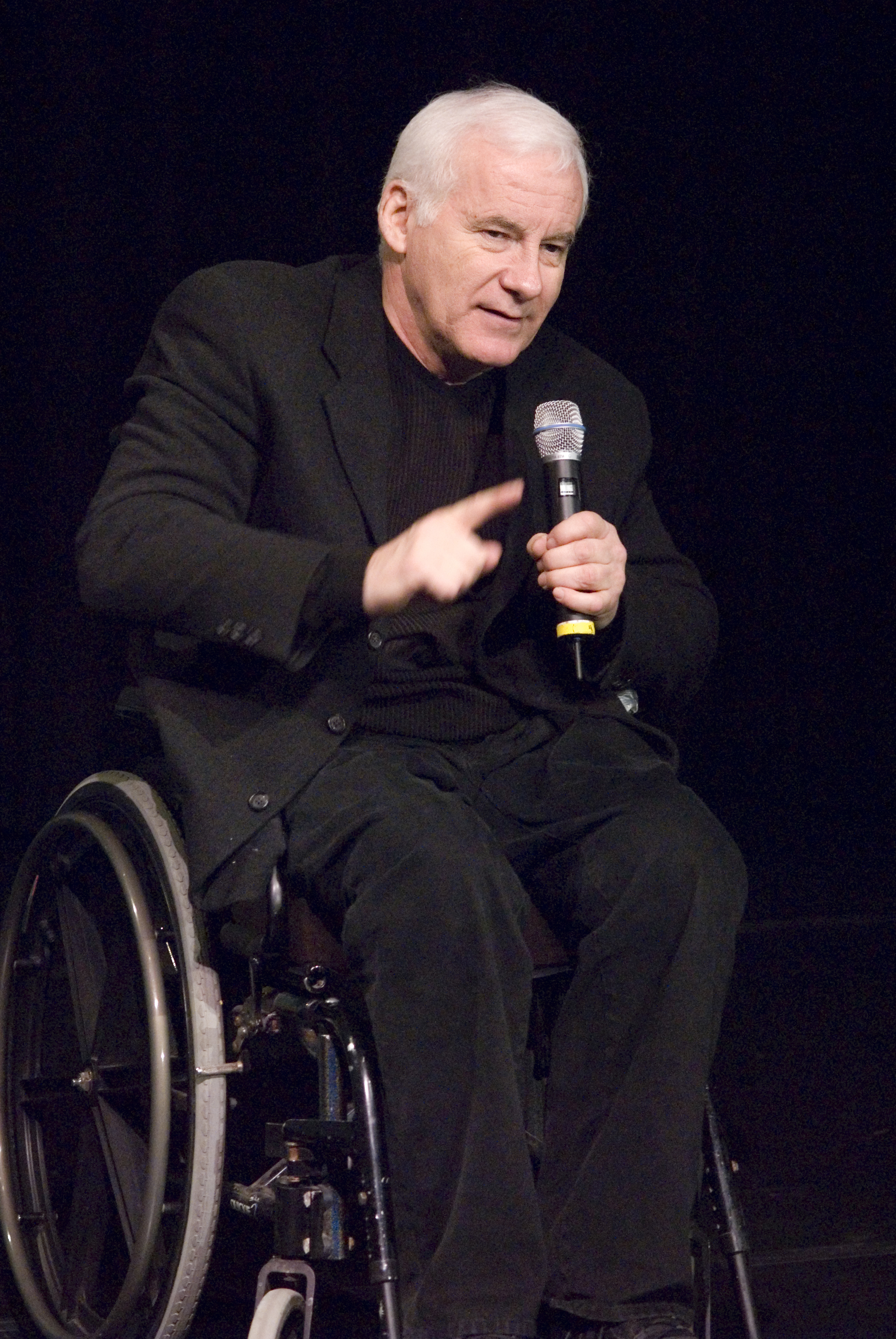
Bobby Muller, speaking at Utah Valley State College during the Peace and Justice Dialogue, March 1, 2007

Bobby Muller (born 1946) is an American peace advocate.

He was born on Long Island, and grew up in Great Neck, New York. He enlisted in the U.S. Marine Corps in 1967, during the Vietnam War. His commission with the Marines began the same day he received his bachelor's degree in business administration from Hofstra University in 1968, and by September of that year he was a combat lieutenant leading a marine infantry platoon. In April 1969, while leading an assault in Vietnam, a bullet entered his chest and severed his spinal cord, leaving him paralyzed from the chest down.

After returning from Vietnam, Muller became a staunch advocate for veterans' rights and a peace activist. In 1974, he earned his J.D. degree from the Hofstra University School of Law. In the same year, he appeared in the anti-war documentary film Hearts and Minds, speaking about his life before, during, and after the Vietnam War. He founded Vietnam Veterans of America in 1978 and Vietnam Veterans of America Foundation (VVAF) in 1980. The VVAF co-founded the International Campaign to Ban Landmines, which won a 1997 Nobel Peace Prize.

In 2004, Muller founded Alliance for Security. He is currently serving as an advisory board member for a group called Operation Truth and for the Military Religious Freedom Foundation.

Muller is president of Veterans for America (formerly known as the Vietnam Veterans of America Foundation). Veterans for America is uniting the new generation of veterans with those from past wars to address the needs of veterans, service members and their families and their larger concerns about the impact of war. It is an advocacy and humanitarian organization. Veterans for America is committed to advancing policy and elevating public discourse on the causes, conduct and consequences of war.

Muller is a friend of Bill Wieman, Mark Clevinger, and Ron Kovic. He has lectured about his experiences on over 100 college campuses.

== Appearances ==
In 1994, Muller was the subject of an ABCNews magazine story called, Muller's Mission. The piece, which aired on DayOne, focused on Muller's life story, his experience in a Vietnam Vet's hospital system, and building the Vietnam Vets of America movement in the 1970s. It also documented his work with landmine victims in Cambodia and included the first ever network news interview with his friend and supporter Bruce Springsteen. The piece would go on to win an EMMY award the following year.

In a 1997 MSNBC NewsChat segment, Muller debated Ann Coulter. Muller attempted to explain to Coulter that "In 90 percent of cases that U.S. soldiers got blown up—Ann, are you listening?—they were our own mines." She interrupted Muller's point about the role that landmines played in the Vietnam War with the statement "No wonder you guys lost." Muller responded to Coulter's remark with an incredulous "Say that again," while moderator Felicia Taylor sharply rebuked the in-house pundit: "OK, we're not going to get into that conversation. Ann, that was unnecessary! Mr. Muller, please continue...."

Time magazine reported the incident differently:

Muller was misquoting a 1969 Pentagon report that found that 90 percent of the components used in enemy mines came from U.S. duds and refuse. Coulter, who found Muller's statement laughable, averted her eyes and responded sarcastically: "No wonder you guys lost." It became an infamous—and oft-misreported—Coulter moment. The Washington Post and others turned the line into a more personal attack: "People like you caused us to lose that war."

— Time; 4/25/2005, Vol. 165 Issue 17, p32-42

Films

- 1973 – Operation Last Patrol, directed by Frank Cavestani and Catherine Leroy.
- 1974 – Hearts and Minds, directed by Peter Davis.
- 1981 – Heroes, directed by John Pilger.
- 2007 – Body of War, directed by Ellen Spiro and Phil Donahue.

== See also ==
- List of filmsJohn Pilger – Heroes 1981
