= Opposition to United States involvement in the Vietnam War =

1965–1973 anti-war movement

- Part of the counterculture of the 1960s, the Vietnam War, and the Cold War
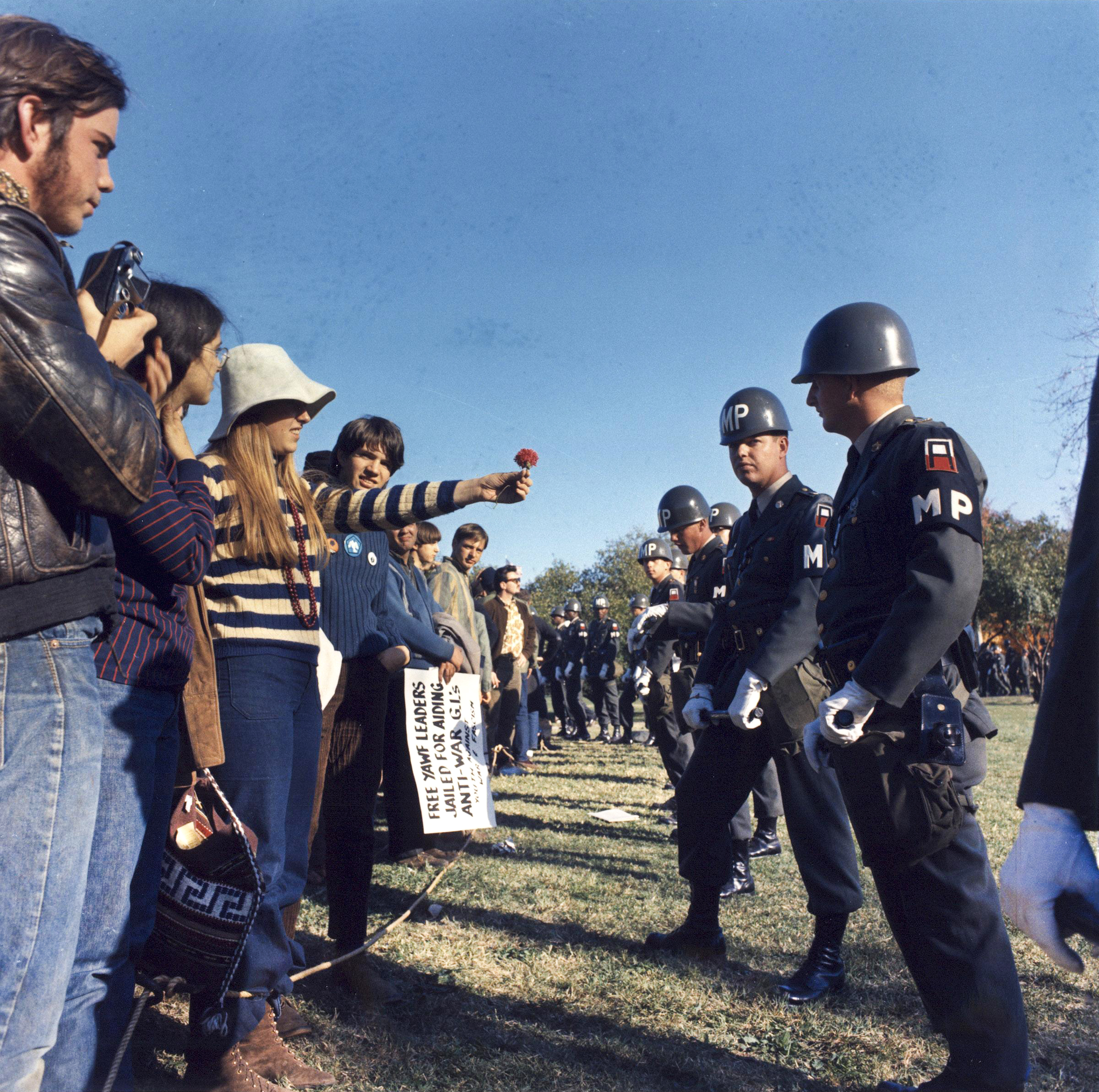
- A demonstrator offering a flower to a military police guard at the March on the Pentagon on October 21, 1967
- Date: 8 March 1965 – 29 March 1973
- Location: Global (especially within the United States and other western countries)
- Caused by: United States in the Vietnam War
- Goals: End of military conscription; Reducing of American foreign military intervention
- Result: Disruption of military conscription; Lowered military morale; End of the Johnson presidency and withdrawal of candidacy; Voting age lowered to 18; Paris Peace Accords; Withdrawal of US troops and military aid

Parties
Anti-war protesters	United States government

Casualties and losses
4 killed, 9 injured at Kent State University; 11 injured at University of New Mexico; 4 protesters killed during the Chicano Moratorium	4 killed in bombings by the Red Army Faction, including U.S. Officer Paul Bloomquist; 1 killed in Sterling Hall bombing

Opposition to United States involvement in the Vietnam War reached a substantial scale in 1965 with demonstrations against the country's escalating role in the war. Over the next several years, these demonstrations grew into a social movement which was incorporated into the broader counterculture of the 1960s.

Members of the peace movement within the United States at first consisted of many students, mothers, and anti-establishment youth. Opposition grew with the participation of leaders and activists of the civil rights, feminist, and Chicano movements, as well as sectors of organized labor. Additional involvement came from many other groups, including educators, clergy, academics, journalists, lawyers, military veterans, physicians (notably Benjamin Spock), and others.

Anti-war demonstrations consisted mostly of peaceful, nonviolent protests. By 1967, an increasing number of Americans considered military involvement in Vietnam to be a mistake. This was echoed decades later by former Secretary of Defense Robert McNamara.

US military involvement in Vietnam began in 1950 with the support of French forces fighting against the Việt Minh in the First Indochina War. Military involvement and opposition escalated after the Congressional authorization of the Gulf of Tonkin Resolution in August 1964, with US ground troops arriving in Vietnam on March 8, 1965. Richard Nixon was elected President of the United States in 1968 on the platform of ending the Vietnam War and eventually (after US involvement in the Vietnam War was over) ending the draft. Nixon began the drawdown of US troops in April 1969. Protests spiked after the announcement of the expansion of the war into Cambodia in April 1970. The Pentagon Papers were published in June 1971. The last US combat troops withdrew from Vietnam in August 1972, and the last draftees reported in early 1973.

== Background ==
=== Causes of opposition ===
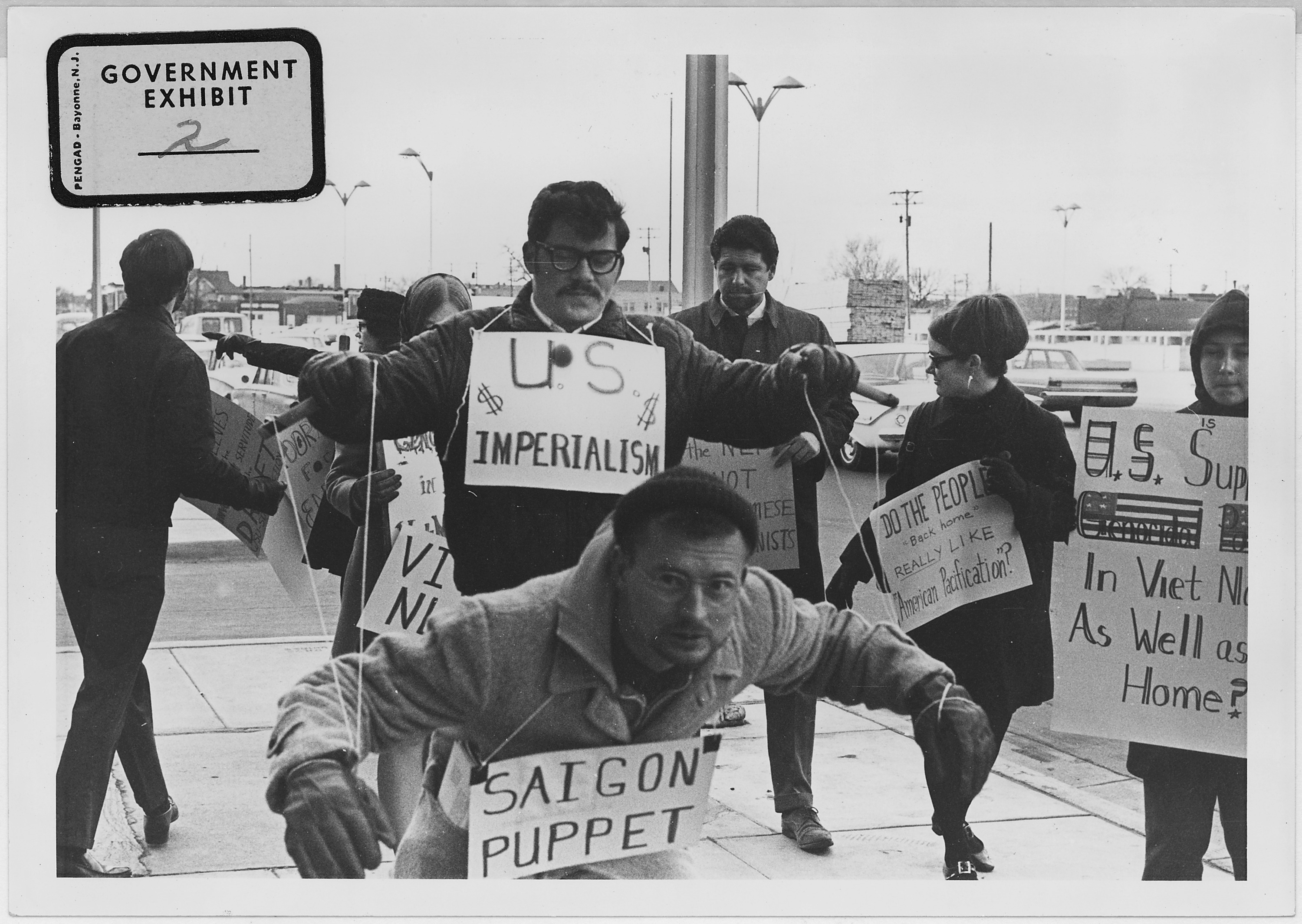
Anti–Vietnam War protesters in Wichita, Kansas in 1967

The draft, a system of conscription that mainly drew from minorities and lower and middle-class whites, inspired much of the protest after 1965. Conscientious objectors played an active role despite their small numbers. Student and blue-collar American opposition to the military draft was compelled by a sentiment that the draft was unfairly administered.

Opposition to the war arose during a time of unprecedented student activism, which included the free speech movement and the civil rights movement. The military draft mobilized the baby-boomers, who were most at risk of being drafted, but the opposition grew to include a varied cross-section of Americans. The growing opposition to the Vietnam War was partly attributed to greater access to uncensored information through extensive television coverage on the ground in Vietnam.

Anti-War protesters primarily made moral arguments against US involvement in Vietnam. In May 1954, preceding the Quaker protests but just after the defeat of the French at Dien Bien Phu, the American Friends Service Committee bought a page in The New York Times to protest what seemed to be the tendency of the US to step into Indochina as France was stepping out. The moral imperative argument against the war was especially popular among American college students, who were more likely than the general public to accuse the United States of having imperialistic goals in Vietnam and to criticize the war as "immoral". Civilian deaths, which had been downplayed or omitted entirely by the Western media, became a subject of protest when photographic evidence of casualties emerged. The infamous photo of General Nguyễn Ngọc Loan shooting a Viet Cong captain in handcuffs during the Tet Offensive also provoked public outcry.

Another element of the American opposition to the war was the perception that US justification for intervention in Vietnam (i.e. the domino theory and the threat of communism) was not legally justifiable. Some Americans believed that the communist threat was used to hide imperialistic intentions. Others argued that the American intervention in South Vietnam interfered with the self-determination of the country, expressing that the war in Vietnam was a civil war that ought to have determined the fate of the country.

Media coverage of the war also shook citizens at home as the television, which had become common in American homes in the 1950s, brought images of the wartime conflict to viewers in their homes. Newscasters, like NBC's Frank McGee, stated that the war was all but lost as a "conclusion to be drawn inescapably from the facts." For the first time in American history, the media had the means to broadcast battlefield images. Graphic footage of casualties on the nightly news eliminated any myth of the glory of war. With no clear sign of victory in Vietnam, American military casualties helped stimulate opposition to the war by Americans. In their book Manufacturing Consent, Edward S. Herman and Noam Chomsky rejected this view of how the media influenced the war, on the basis that in their view that the media instead censored the more brutal images of the fighting and the death of millions of innocent people.

=== Polarization ===
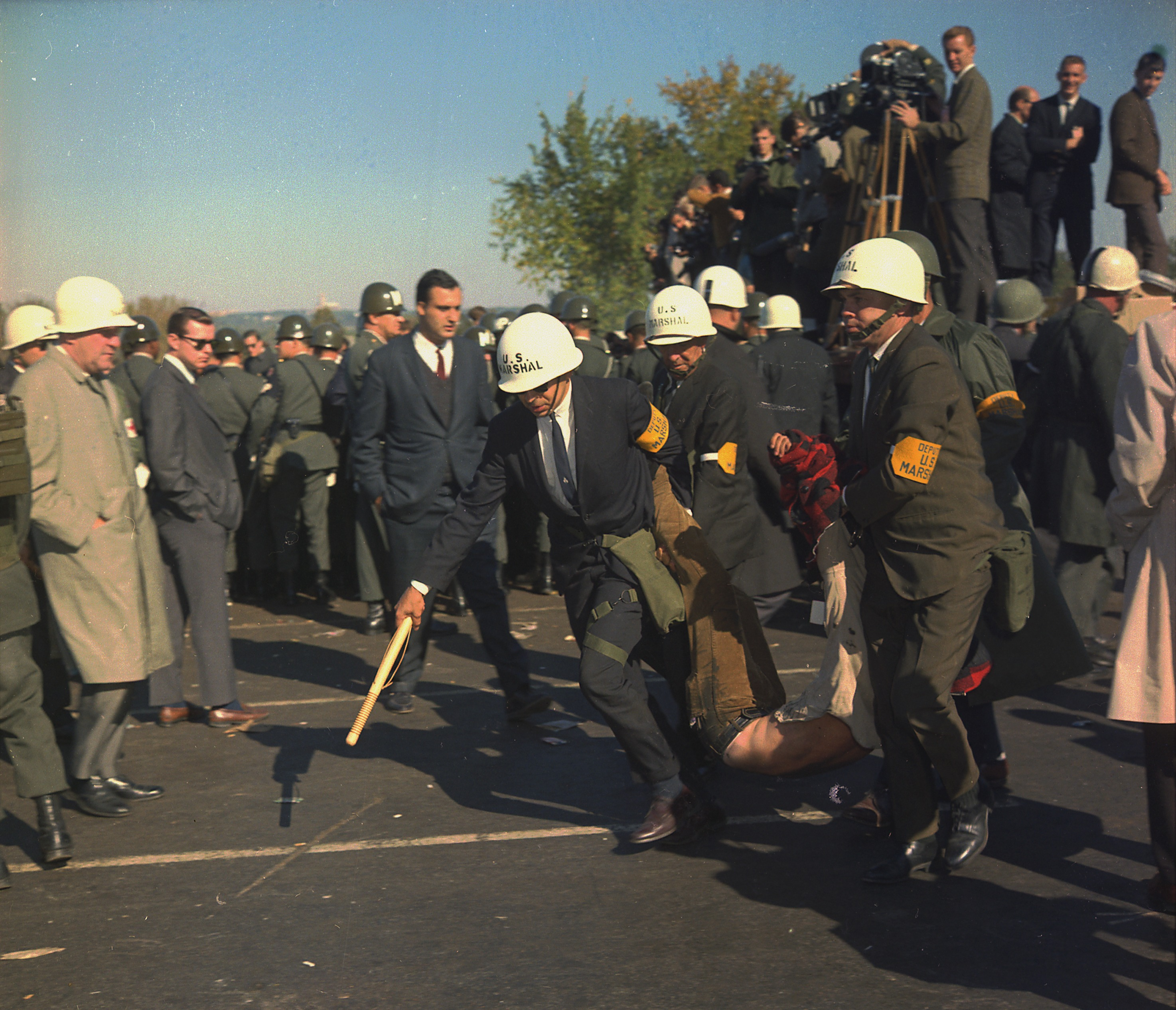
US Marshals dragging away an anti–Vietnam War protester during a demonstration at the Pentagon in 1967

If America's soul becomes totally poisoned, part of the autopsy must read "Vietnam."

— Martin Luther King Jr., 1967

The US became polarized over the war. Many supporters of US involvement argued for what was known as the domino theory, a theory that stated that if one country fell to communism, then the bordering countries would be sure to fall as well like dominoes. This theory was largely held due to the fall of Eastern Europe to communism and the Soviet sphere of influence following World War II. However, military critics of the war pointed out that the Vietnam War was political, and that the military mission lacked any clear idea of how to achieve its objectives. Civilian critics of the war argued that the US-backed government of South Vietnam lacked political legitimacy or that support for the war was completely immoral.

The media also played a substantial role in the polarization of American opinion regarding the Vietnam War. In 1965, the majority of media attention was focused on military tactics with very little discussion about the necessity of a full-scale intervention in Southeast Asia. After 1965, the media covered the dissent and domestic controversy that existed within the United States, but mostly excluded the expressed views of dissidents and resisters.

The media established a sphere of public discourse around the Hawk versus Dove debate. The Doves were people who had liberal views and were critics of the war. Doves claimed that the war was well-intended, but a disastrous mistake in an otherwise benign foreign policy. The Doves did not question the intentions of the US in intervening in Vietnam, nor did they question the morality or legality of the US intervention. Instead, they made pragmatic claims that the war was a mistake. Contrarily, the Hawks represented people who argued that the war was legitimate, winnable, and part of US foreign policy. The Hawks claimed that the one-sided criticism of the media contributed to the decline of public support for the war and ultimately caused the US to lose the war. Conservative author William F. Buckley repeatedly wrote about his approval of the war and suggested, "[t]he United States has been timid, if not cowardly, in refusing to seek 'victory' in Vietnam." The Hawks claimed that liberal media was responsible for the growing popular disenchantment with the war and blamed Western media for losing the war in Southeast Asia.

== History ==
=== Early protests ===
Early protests were relatively small. On May 2, 1964, for example, slightly less than eighty protesters marched against the war in Harvard Square, just outside the gates of Harvard University.

The first large-scale protest, organized primarily by Students for a Democratic Society, was in Washington, D.C., on April 17, 1965. More than 20,000 people are believed to have participated.

Protests began bringing attention to the draft on May 5, 1965. Student activists at the University of California, Berkeley marched on the Berkeley Draft Board and forty students staged the first public draft-card burning in the United States. Another 19 cards were burned on May 22, 1965, at a demonstration following the Berkeley teach-in. Draft card protests were primarily aimed at the immoral conduct of the war, rather than the draft itself.

At that time, only a fraction of all men of draft-able age were actually being conscripted, but the Draft Board in each locality had broad discretion on whom to draft and whom to exempt in cases where there was no clear guideline for exemption. In late July 1965, Johnson doubled the number of young men to be drafted per month from 17,000 to 35,000, and on August 31, 1965, he signed the Draft Card Mutilation Act, making it a crime to knowingly destroy or mutilate a draft card.

On October 15, 1965, the student-run National Coordinating Committee to End the War in Vietnam in New York staged the first draft card burning, resulting in an arrest under the new law.

Gruesome images of two anti-war activists who set themselves on fire in November 1965 demonstrated how strongly some people felt that the war was immoral. On November 2, 32-year-old Quaker Norman Morrison set himself on fire in front of The Pentagon. On November 9, 22-year-old Catholic Worker Movement member Roger Allen LaPorte did the same in front of United Nations Headquarters in New York City. Both protests were conscious imitations of earlier (and ongoing) Buddhist protests in South Vietnam.

=== Government reactions ===
Throughout the Vietnam War, presidents of the United States included John F. Kennedy, Lyndon B. Johnson, and ended with Richard Nixon. President Johnson felt compelled to defend the South Vietnamese government against North Vietnam and the Viet Cong. Johnson and many of his advisors also feared a communist takeover in the region as part of the larger context of the United States' Cold War with the Soviet Union. However, as a result of such involvement in the war, US citizens began to protest the war.

The growing anti-war movement alarmed many in the US government. On August 16, 1966, the House Un-American Activities Committee (HUAC) began investigations of Americans who were suspected of aiding the National Front for the Liberation of Vietnam. They intended to introduce legislation making these activities illegal. Anti-war demonstrators disrupted the meeting, with 50 individuals being arrested.

An alternate example would be the Pentagon Riot of 1967. During this riot, a crowd of some 35 thousand individuals took to the US Pentagon, with some scaling the walls and forcing their way inside the Pentagon. Troops attempted to ease the riot and the Deputy Marshals made 682 arrests with 47 individuals being injured during the incident. In 1970, moving into the Nixon administration, protestors crowded around the Washington Monument in protest of the war, and Nixon drove down there to attempt to speak with them and listen to their views. Another incident occurred in 1971 when thousands of protestors took to the streets in Washington, D.C., and built temporary barricades to halt traffic. As a result, the Nixon administration sent a police force and arrested about 7 thousand protestors. This however, did not stop the anti-war movement, and protests continued into January 1973 until the end of US involvement in Vietnam.

=== Shifting opinion ===
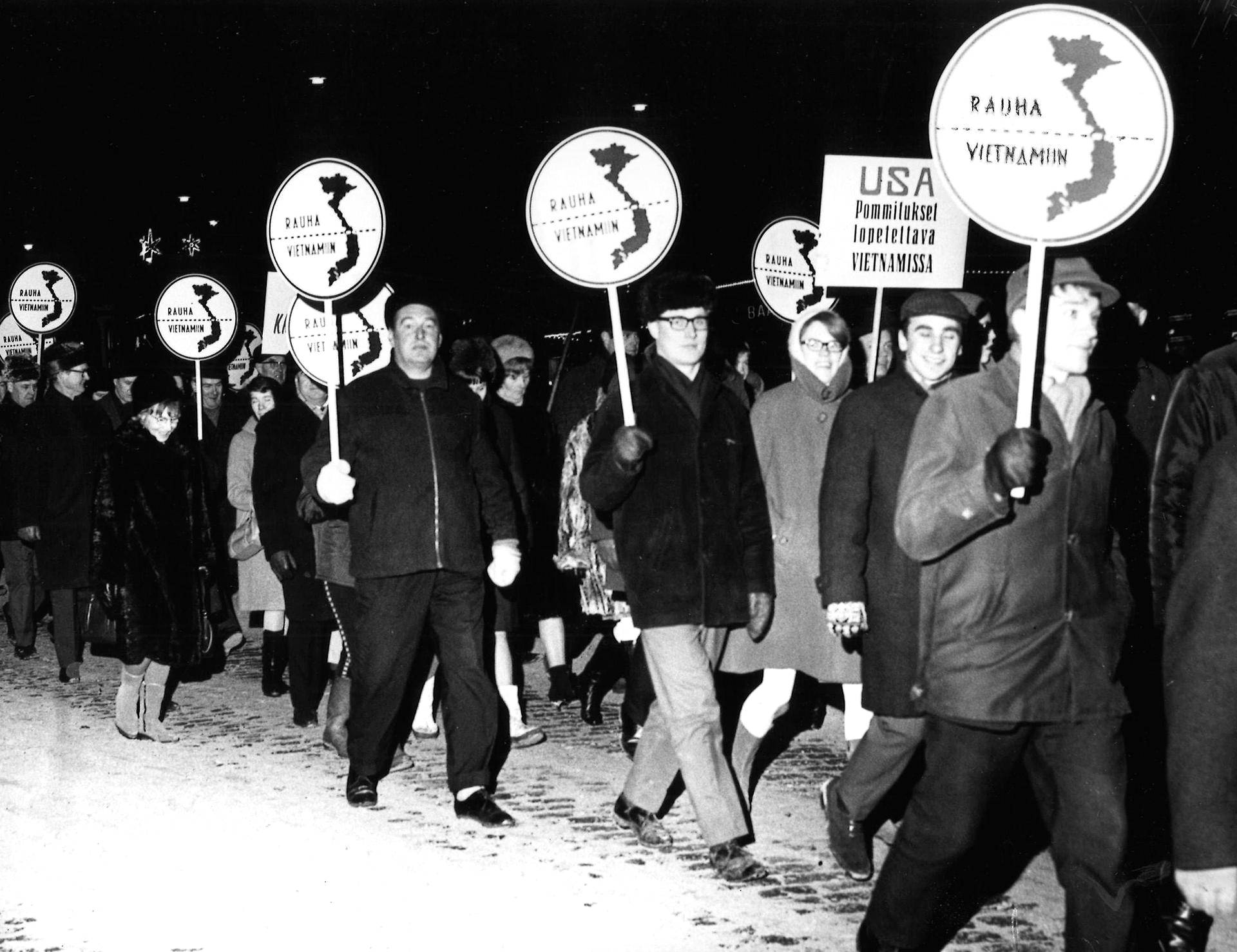
An anti–Vietnam War protest in Helsinki, Finland, in December 1967

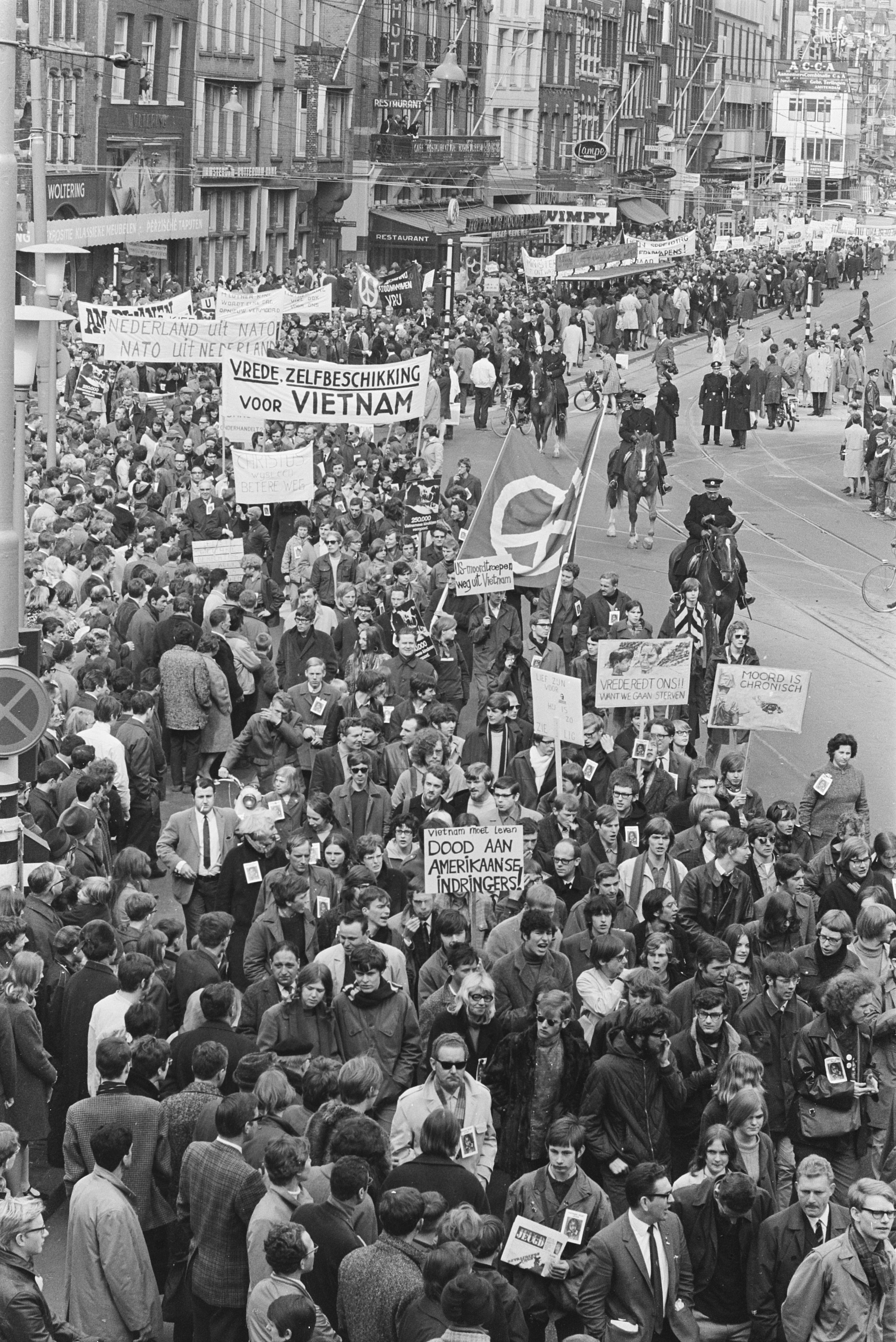
Protest against the Vietnam War in Amsterdam, April 1968

In February 1967, The New York Review of Books published "The Responsibility of Intellectuals," an essay by Noam Chomsky, a leading intellectual opponent of the war. In the essay, Chomsky argued that much responsibility for the war lay with liberal intellectuals and technical experts who were providing, what he saw as, pseudo scientific justification for the policies of the US government. The Time Inc. magazines Time and Life maintained a very pro-war editorial stance until October 1967, when the editor-in-chief Hedley Donovan came out against the war. Donovan wrote in an editorial in Life that the United States had gone into Vietnam for "honorable and sensible purposes", but the war had turned out to be "harder, longer, more complicated" than expected. Donovan ended his editorial by writing that the war was "not worth winning," as South Vietnam was "not absolutely imperative" to maintain American interests in Asia, which made it impossible "to ask young Americans to die for."

=== Draft protests ===
In 1967, the continued operation of the draft system, then calling for as many as 40,000 men for induction each month, fueled a burgeoning draft resistance movement. The draft exhibited a disproportionate selection of young African American men and economically disadvantaged men of all races, resulting in higher enlistment rates compared to white, middle-class men. In 1967, although there were fewer draft-eligible black men (29% of all draft-eligible men) compared to white men (63%), a higher percentage of the eligible black men (64% of the 29%) were chosen for conscription to serve in the war, as opposed to only 31% of eligible white men.

On October 16, 1967, draft card turn-ins were held across the country, yielding more than 1,000 draft cards, later returned to the Justice Department as an act of civil disobedience. Resisters expected to be prosecuted immediately, but Attorney General Ramsey Clark chose to prosecute a group of ringleaders, including Dr. Benjamin Spock and Yale chaplain William Sloane Coffin, Jr., in Boston in 1968. By the late 1960s, one-quarter of all court cases dealt with the draft, including men accused of draft-dodging and men petitioning for the status of conscientious objector. Over 210,000 men were accused of draft-related offenses, 25,000 of whom were indicted.

The concerns regarding equity prompted the establishment of a draft lottery in 1970, where a young man's birthday determined his relative risk of being drafted. For the year 1970, September 14 was the birthday at the top of the draft list, while the following year, July 9 held this distinction.

Despite popular anti-war speculation that most American soldiers (especially those killed) were draftees, this was discredited in later years, as the large majority of these soldiers were confirmed to be volunteers.

=== Developments in the war ===
On February 1, 1968, Nguyễn Văn Lém a Viet Cong officer suspected of participating in the murder of South Vietnamese government officials during the Tet Offensive, was summarily executed by General Nguyễn Ngọc Loan, the South Vietnamese National Police Chief. Loan shot Lém in the head on a public street in Saigon, despite being in front of journalists. South Vietnamese reports, provided as justification after the fact, claimed that Lém was captured near the site of a ditch holding as many as thirty-four bound and executed bodies of police and their relatives, including some who were the families of General Loan's deputy and close friend. The execution created an iconic image that influenced public opinion in the United States against the war.

The events of Tet in early 1968 as a whole significantly altered public opinion regarding the war. US military officials had previously reported successful prosecution of counter-insurgency in South Vietnam. While the Tet Offensive resulted in a significant victory for the US and allied militaries by bringing the Viet Cong into open battle and dismantling them as a fighting force, the American media, including respected figures like Walter Cronkite, interpreted events such as the attack on the American embassy in Saigon as a sign of US military vulnerability. The military victories on the battlefields of Tet were overshadowed by shocking images of violence on television screens, extensive casualty lists, and a new perception among the American people that the military had been less than truthful about the success of earlier military operations, and, ultimately, the ability to achieve a meaningful military solution in Vietnam.

=== 1968 presidential election ===
In 1968, President Lyndon B. Johnson began his re-election campaign. Eugene McCarthy ran against him for the Democratic nomination on an anti-war platform. McCarthy did not win the first primary election in New Hampshire, but he did surprisingly well against an incumbent. The resulting blow to the Johnson campaign, combined with other factors, led the President to announce that he was pulling out of the race on March 31 in a televised speech. He also announced the initiation of the Paris Peace Negotiations with Vietnam in that speech. On August 4, 1969, US representative Henry Kissinger and North Vietnamese representative Xuan Thuy initiated secret peace negotiations at the apartment of French intermediary Jean Sainteny in Paris.

After breaking with Johnson's pro-war stance, Robert F. Kennedy entered the race on March 16 and ran for the nomination on an anti-war platform. Johnson's vice president, Hubert Humphrey, also ran for the nomination, promising to continue to support the South Vietnamese government.

=== Moratorium to End the War in Vietnam ===
In May 1969, Life magazine published photographs of the faces of the roughly 250 or so American servicemen who had been killed in Vietnam during a "routine week" of war in the spring of 1969. Contrary to expectations, the issue sold out, with many individuals being haunted by the photographs of the ordinary young Americans killed. On October 15, 1969, hundreds of thousands of people took part in National Moratorium anti-war demonstrations across the United States. The demonstrations prompted many workers to call in sick from their jobs and adolescents nationwide engaged in truancy from school. About 15 million Americans took part in the demonstration of October 15, making it the largest protest in a single day at that point in history. A second round of "Moratorium" demonstrations was held on November 15 and attracted more people than the first. Over half a million people rallied in Washington, D.C., while about 250,000 rallied in San Francisco. The Washington demonstration was preceded by the "March against Death" on November 13 and 14.

=== Hearts and Minds campaign ===
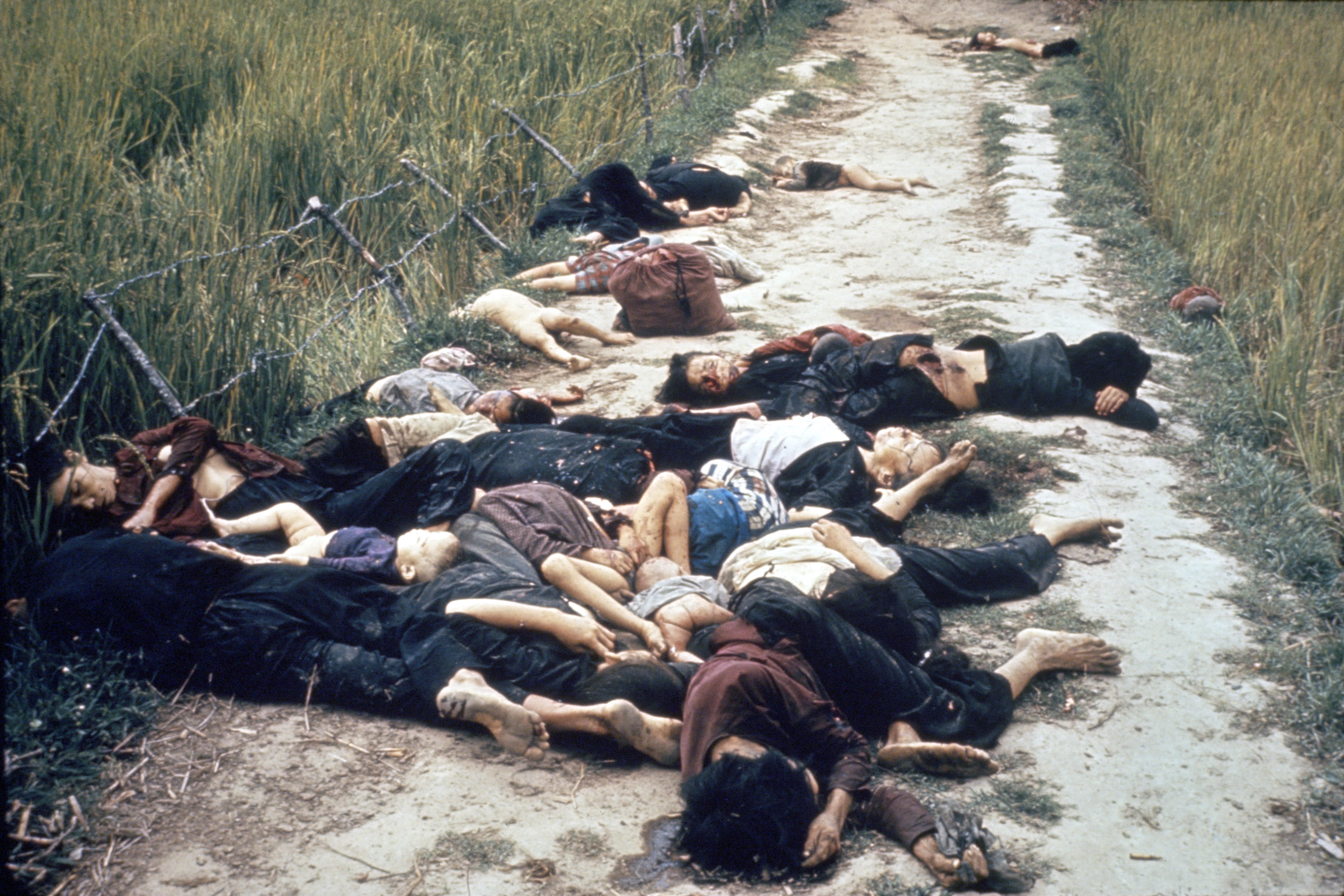
The My Lai massacre, cited as an example of a war crime by anti–Vietnam War protesters

The US realized that the South Vietnamese government needed a solid base of popular support if it were to survive the insurgency. To pursue this goal of winning the "Hearts and Minds" of the Vietnamese people, units of the United States Army, referred to as "Civil Affairs" units, were used extensively for the first time since World War II.

Civil Affairs units, while remaining armed and under direct military control, engaged in what came to be known as "nation-building": constructing (or reconstructing) schools, public buildings, roads, and other infrastructure; conducting medical programs for civilians who had no access to medical facilities; facilitating cooperation among local civilian leaders; conducting hygiene and other training for civilians; and engaging in similar activities.

This policy of attempting to win the hearts and minds of the Vietnamese people, however, often was at odds with other aspects of the war, which sometimes served to antagonize many Vietnamese civilians and provided ammunition to the anti-war movement. These included the emphasis on "body count" as a way of measuring military success on the battlefield, civilian casualties during the bombing of villages (symbolized by journalist Peter Arnett's famous quote, "it became necessary to destroy the town to save it"), and the killing of civilians in such incidents as the My Lai massacre. In 1974, the documentary Hearts and Minds sought to portray the devastation the war was causing to the South Vietnamese people and won an Academy Award for Best Documentary amid considerable controversy. The South Vietnamese government also antagonized many of its citizens with the suppression of political opposition through such measures as holding large numbers of political prisoners, torturing political opponents, and holding a one-man election for President in 1971. Covert counter-terror programs and semi-covert ones such as the Phoenix Program attempted, with the help of anthropologists, to isolate rural South Vietnamese villages and affect the loyalty of the residents.

=== Increasing polarization ===
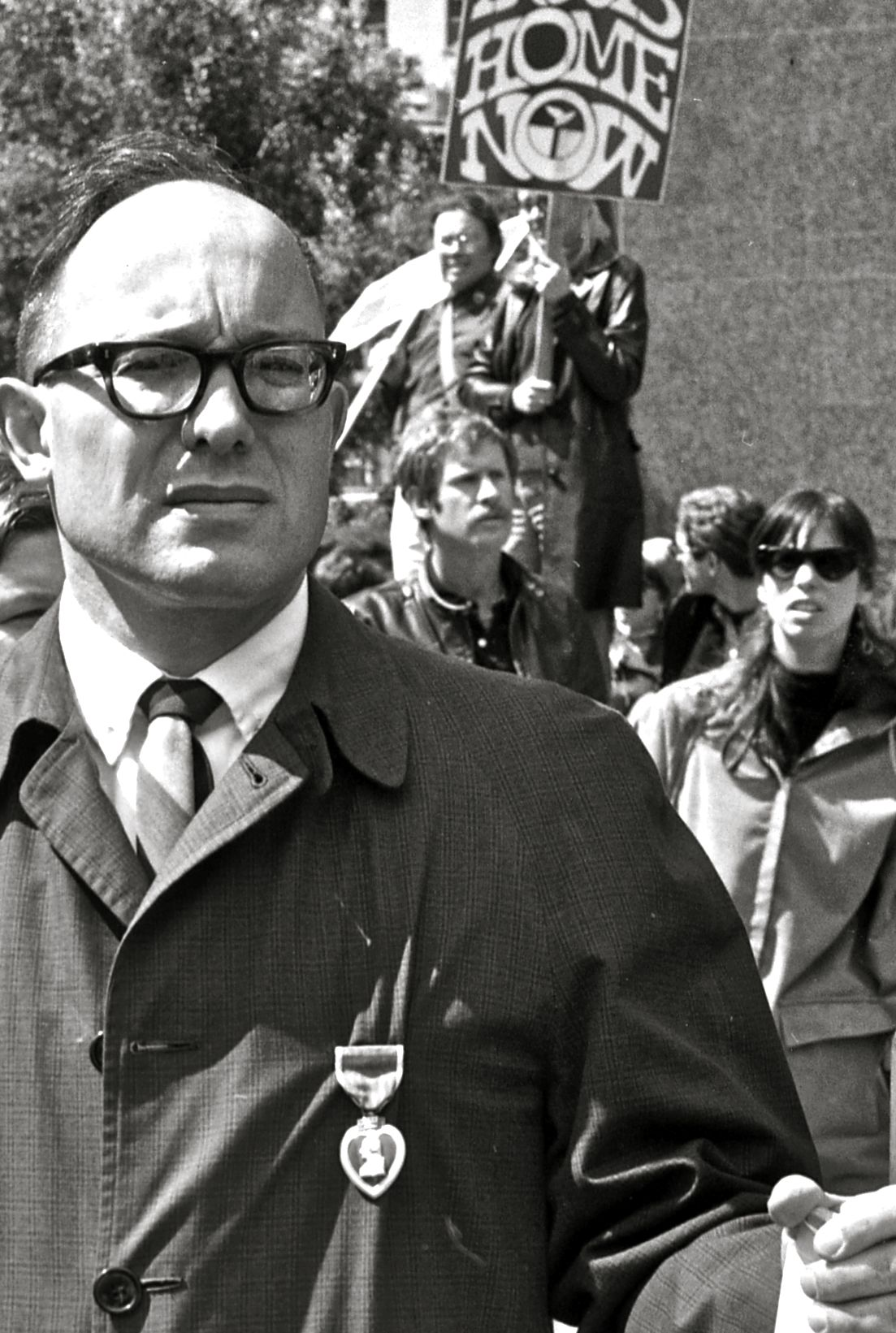
A man wearing a Purple Heart watching an anti–Vietnam War march in San Francisco in April 1967

Despite the increasingly disheartening news of the war, many Americans continued to support President Johnson's efforts. Apart from the Domino Theory, there was a sense that the objective of preventing a communist takeover of a pro-Western government in South Vietnam was a noble goal. Many Americans were also concerned about maintaining dignity in the event of disengaging from the war or, as President Richard M. Nixon later described it, "achieving Peace with Honor." Additionally, instances of Viet Cong atrocities were widely reported, most notably in an article that appeared in Reader's Digest in 1968 titled The Blood-Red Hands of Ho Chi Minh.

==== Opposition to the war from Vietnam veterans ====
However, anti-war feelings also began to rise. Many Americans opposed the war on moral grounds, appalled by the devastation and violence of the war. Others claimed the conflict was a war against Vietnamese independence or an intervention in a foreign civil war; others opposed it because they felt it lacked clear objectives and appeared to be unwinnable. Many anti-war activists themselves were Vietnam veterans, as evidenced by the organization Vietnam Veterans Against the War.

=== Later protests ===
In April 1971, thousands of these veterans converged on the White House in Washington, D.C., and hundreds threw their medals and decorations on the steps of the United States Capitol. By this time, it had also become commonplace for the most radical anti-war demonstrators to prominently display the flag of the Viet Cong "enemy", an act – along with protesters destroying ROTC facilities on campuses and fighting with the police – which had alienated many Americans who were otherwise opposed to the war from the anti-war movement.

== Opposition groups ==
As the Vietnam War continued to escalate, public disenchantment grew, and a variety of different groups were formed or became involved in the movement.

=== African Americans ===
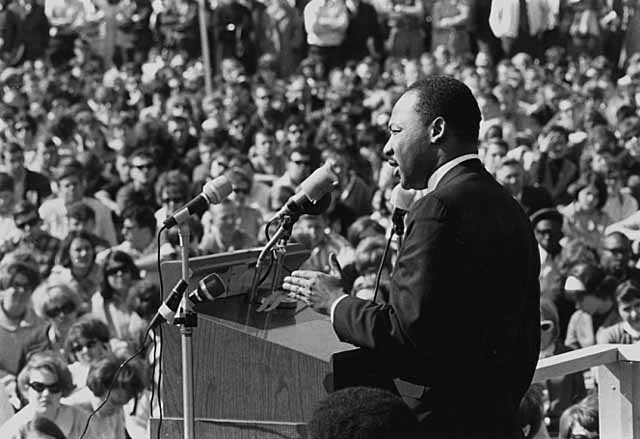
Martin Luther King Jr. speaking to an anti–Vietnam War rally at the University of Minnesota on April 27, 1967

African-American leaders of earlier decades, like W. E. B. Du Bois, were often anti-imperialist and anti-capitalist. Paul Robeson weighed in on the Vietnamese struggle in 1954, calling Ho Chi Minh "the modern day Toussaint Louverture, leading his people to freedom." These figures were driven from public life by McCarthyism, however, and black leaders were more cautious about criticizing US foreign policy as the 1960s began.

By the middle of the decade, open condemnation of the war became more common, with figures like Malcolm X and Bob Moses speaking out. Champion boxer Muhammad Ali risked his career and a prison sentence to resist the draft in 1966. Soon, Martin Luther King Jr., Coretta Scott King, and James Bevel of the Southern Christian Leadership Conference (SCLC) became prominent opponents of the Vietnam War, and Bevel became the director of the National Mobilization Committee to End the War in Vietnam. The Black Panther Party vehemently opposed US involvement in Vietnam. At the beginning of the war, some African Americans did not want to join the war opposition movement because of their loyalty to President Johnson for pushing the Civil Rights legislation, but soon the escalating violence of the war and the perceived social injustice of the draft propelled involvement in antiwar groups.

In March 1965, King first criticized the war during the Selma March when he told a journalist that "millions of dollars can be spent every day to hold troops in South Vietnam and our country cannot protect the rights of Negroes in Selma". In 1965, the Student Nonviolent Coordinating Committee (SNCC) became the first major civil rights group to issue a formal statement against the war. When SNCC-backed Georgia Representative Julian Bond acknowledged his agreement with the anti-war statement, he was refused his seat by the State of Georgia, an injustice which he successfully appealed up to the Supreme Court. SNCC had special significance as a nexus between the student movement and the black movement. At an SDS-organized conference at UC Berkeley in October 1966, SNCC Chair Stokely Carmichael challenged the white left to escalate their resistance to the military draft in a manner similar to the black movement. Some participants in ghetto rebellions of the era had already associated their actions with opposition to the Vietnam War, and SNCC first disrupted an Atlanta draft board in August 1966. According to historians Joshua Bloom and Waldo Martin, SDS's first Stop the Draft Week of October 1967 was "inspired by Black Power [and] emboldened by the ghetto rebellions." SNCC appears to have originated the popular anti-draft slogan: "Hell no! We won't go!"

On April 4, 1967, King gave a much-publicized speech entitled "Beyond Vietnam: A Time to Break Silence" at the Riverside Church in New York, attacking President Johnson for "deadly Western arrogance," declaring that "we are on the side of the wealthy, and the secure, while we create a hell for the poor". King's speech attracted much controversy at the time, with many feeling that it was ungrateful for him to attack the president who had done the most for civil rights for African Americans since Abraham Lincoln had abolished slavery a century before. Liberal newspapers such as the Washington Post and the New York Times condemned King for his "Beyond Vietnam" speech, while the National Association for the Advancement of Colored People (NAACP) disallowed him. The "Beyond Vietnam" speech involved King in a debate with the diplomat Ralph Bunche who argued that it was folly to associate the civil rights movement with the anti–Vietnam war movement, maintaining that this would set back civil rights for African Americans. This speech also showed how bold King could be when he condemned US "aggression" in Vietnam, and this is considered a milestone in King's critiques against imperialism and militarism.

In 1966 King publicly declared that it was hypocritical for Black Americans to be fighting in Vietnam since they were being treated as second-class citizens back home. One of his arguments was that many white middle-class men avoided the draft by college deferments, but his greatest defense was that the arms race and the Vietnam War were taking much-needed resources away from the civil rights movement and the War on Poverty. To combat these issues, King rallied the poor working class in hopes that the federal government would redirect resources toward fighting the War on Poverty. To emphasize his point, King would use the statistic that the US government had underestimated the cost of the 1967 war budget by $10 billion, which was five times the poverty budget.

Black anti-war groups opposed the war for similar reasons as white groups but often protested in separate events and sometimes did not cooperate with the ideas of white anti-war leadership. They harshly criticized the draft because poor and minority men were usually most affected by conscription. In 1965 and 1966, African Americans accounted for 25 percent of combat deaths, more than twice their proportion of the population. As a result, black enlisted men protested and began the resistance movement among veterans. After taking measures to reduce the fatalities, apparently in response to widespread protest, the military brought the proportion of blacks down to 12.6 percent of casualties.

African Americans involved in the anti-war movement often formed their own groups, such as Black Women Enraged, National Black Anti-War Anti-Draft Union, and National Black Draft Counselors. Some differences in these groups included how Black Americans rallied behind the banner of "Self-determination for Black America and Vietnam," while whites marched under banners that said, "Support Our GIs, Bring Them Home Now!". Within these groups, however, many African American women were seen as subordinate members by black male leaders. Many African American women viewed the war in Vietnam as racially motivated and sympathized strongly with Vietnamese women. Such concerns often propelled their participation in the anti-war movement and their creation of new opposition groups.

=== Artists ===
Many artists during the 1960s and 1970s opposed the war and used their creativity and careers to oppose the war visibly. Writers and poets who were opposed to involvement in the war included Allen Ginsberg, Denise Levertov, Robert Duncan, and Robert Bly. Artists often incorporated imagery based on the tragic events of the war, as well as on the disparity between life in Vietnam and life in the United States. Visual artists such as Ronald Haeberle, Peter Saul, Leon Golub, Nancy Spero, among many others, created anti-war works. Radical art collectives, such as the Bread and Puppet Theater, were similarly active. According to art historian Matthew Israel's book Kill for Peace: American Artists Against the Vietnam War, "significant examples of this politically engaged production...encompassed painting, sculpture, performance, installation, posters, short films, and comics – and... ranged from the most 'representational' to the most 'abstract' forms of expression."

Filmmakers such as Lenny Lipton, Jerry Abrams, Peter Gessner, and David Ringo created documentary-style movies featuring footage from the anti-war marches to raise awareness about the war and the diverse opposition movement. Playwrights like Frank O'Hara, Sam Shepard, Robert Lowell, Megan Terry, Grant Duay, and Kenneth Bernard used theater as a vehicle for portraying their thoughts about the Vietnam War, often satirizing the role of America in the world and juxtaposing the horrific effects of war with normal scenes of life. Regardless of medium, anti-war artists ranged from pacifists to violent radicals, and caused Americans to think more critically about the war. Art as war opposition was quite popular in the early years of the war, but soon faded as political activism became the more common and most visible way of opposing the war.

=== Asian-Americans ===
Many Asian Americans were strongly opposed to the Vietnam War. They saw the war as being a significant action of US imperialism and "connected the oppression of the Asians in the United States to the prosecution of the war in Vietnam." Unlike many Americans in the anti-war movement, they viewed the war "not just as imperialist but specifically as anti-Asian." Groups like the Asian American Political Alliance (AAPA), the Bay Area Coalition Against the War (BAACAW), and the Asian Americans for Action (AAA) made opposition to the war their main focus.

Of these organizations, the Bay Area Coalition Against the War was the biggest and most significant. BAACAW was "highly organized, holding biweekly ninety-minute meetings of the Coordinating Committee at which each regional would submit detailed reports and action plans." The driving force behind its formation was anger at "the bombing of Hanoi and the mining of Haiphong Harbor." The organization supported the Japanese Community Youth Center, members of the Asian Community Center, student leaders of Asian American student unions, and others.

The BAACAW members consisted of many Asian Americans, and they were involved in anti-war efforts like marches, study groups, fundraisers, teach-ins, and demonstrations. During marches, Asian American activists carried banners that read "Stop the Bombing of Asian People and Stop Killing Our Asian Brothers and Sisters." Its newsletter stated, "our goal is to build a solid, broad-based anti-imperialist movement of Asian people against the war in Vietnam."

The anti-war sentiment of Asian Americans was fueled by the racial inequality that they faced in the United States. As historian Daryl Maeda notes, "the anti-war movement articulated Asian Americans' racial commonality with Vietnamese people in two distinctly gendered ways: identification based on the experiences of male soldiers and identification by women." Asian American soldiers in the US military were many times classified as being like the enemy. They were referred to as gooks and their identity was racialized in comparison to their non-Asian counterparts. There was also the hyper sexualization of Vietnamese women, which in turn affected how Asian American women in the military were treated. "In a Gidra article, [a prominent influential newspaper of the Asian American movement], Evelyn Yoshimura noted that the US military systematically portrayed Vietnamese women as prostitutes as a way of dehumanizing them."

Asian American groups realized that to extinguish racism, they also had to address sexism as well. This, in turn, led to women's leadership in the Asian American antiwar movement. Patsy Chan, a "Third World" activist, said at an antiwar rally in San Francisco, "We, as Third World women [express] our militant solidarity with our brothers and sisters from Indochina. We, as Third World people know of the struggle the Indochinese are waging against imperialism, because we share that common enemy in the United States." Some other notable figures were Grace Lee Boggs and Yuri Kochiyama. Both Boggs and Kochiyama were inspired by the civil rights movement of the 1960s and "a growing number of Asian Americans began to push forward a new era in radical Asian American politics."

Many Asian Americans spoke against the war because of the way that the Vietnamese were referred to within the US military by the disparaging term "gook", and more generally because they encountered bigotry, because they looked like "the enemy". One Japanese-American veteran, Norman Nakamura, wrote in an article in the June/July issue of Gidra, that during his tour of duty in Vietnam of 1969–70 that there was an atmosphere of systematic racism towards all Vietnamese people, who were seen as less than human, being merely "gooks". Because most white Americans did not make much effort to distinguish between Chinese-Americans, Japanese-Americans, Korean-Americans, and Filipino-Americans, the anti-Asian racism generated by the war led to the emergence of a pan-Asian American identity.

Another Japanese-American veteran, Mike Nakayama, reported to Gidra in 1971 that he was wounded in Vietnam. He was initially refused medical treatment because he was seen as a "gook" with the doctors thinking that he was a South Vietnamese soldier (who was clothed in American uniforms). Only when he established that he spoke English as his first language was he recognized as an American. In May 1972, Gidra ran on its cover a cartoon of a female Viet Cong guerrilla being faced with an Asian-American soldier who is commanded by his white officer to "Kill that gook, you gook!".

There were also Asian American musicians who traveled around the United States to oppose the imperialist actions of the American government, specifically their involvement in Vietnam. "The folk trio 'A Grain of Sand' ... [ consisting of the members] JoAnne 'Nobuko' Miyamoto, Chris Iijima, and William 'Charlie' Chin, performed across the nation as traveling troubadours who set the anti-racist politics of the Asian American movement to music." This band was so against the imperialistic actions of the United States, that they supported the Vietnamese people vocally through their song 'War of the Flea'. Asian American poets and playwrights also joined in unity with the movement's anti-war sentiments. Melvyn Escueta, an Asian American war veteran, created the play Honey Bucket. Through this play, "Escueta establishes equivalencies between his protagonist, a Filipino American soldier named Andy, and the Vietnamese people."

"The Asian American antiwar movement emerged from a belief that the mainstream peace movement was racist in its disregard to Asians ... Steve Louie remembers that while the white anti-war movement had 'this moral thing about no killing,' Asian Americans sought to bring attention to 'a bigger issue ... genocide.' ... the broader movement had a hard time with the Asian movement ... because it broadened the issues out beyond where they wanted to go ... the whole question of US imperialism as a system, at home and abroad."

=== Clergy ===
The clergy, often a forgotten group during the opposition to the Vietnam War, played a large role as well. The clergy covered any of the religious leaders and members, including individuals such as Martin Luther King Jr. In his speech "Beyond Vietnam: A Time to Break Silence", King stated, "the greatest purveyor of violence in the world today: my own government. For the sake of those boys, for the sake of this government, for the sake of the hundreds of thousands trembling under our violence, I cannot be silent." King was not looking for racial equality through this speech but tried to voice an end to the war instead.

The involvement of the clergy did not stop at King. The analysis entitled "Social Movement Participation: Clergy and the Anti–Vietnam War Movement" expands upon the anti-war movement by taking King, a single religious figurehead, and explaining the movement from the entire clergy's perspective. The clergy were often forgotten though throughout this opposition. The analysis refers to that fact by saying, "The research concerning clergy anti-war participation is even more barren than the literature on student activism." There is a relationship and correlation between theology and political opinions, and during the Vietnam War, the same relationship occurred between feelings about the war and theology. This article was a social experiment finding results on how the pastors and clergy members reacted to the war. Based on the results found, the clergy did not believe in the war and wished to help end it.

Another source, Lift Up Your Voice Like A Trumpet: White Clergy And The Civil Rights And Antiwar Movements, 1954–1973 explains the story of the entire spectrum of the clergy and their involvement. Michael Friedland is able to tell the story completely in his chapter entitled, "A Voice of Moderation: Clergy and the Anti-War Movement: 1966–1967". In basic summary, each specific clergy from each religion had their own view of the war and how they dealt with it, but as a whole, the clergy was completely against the war.

=== Draft evasion ===
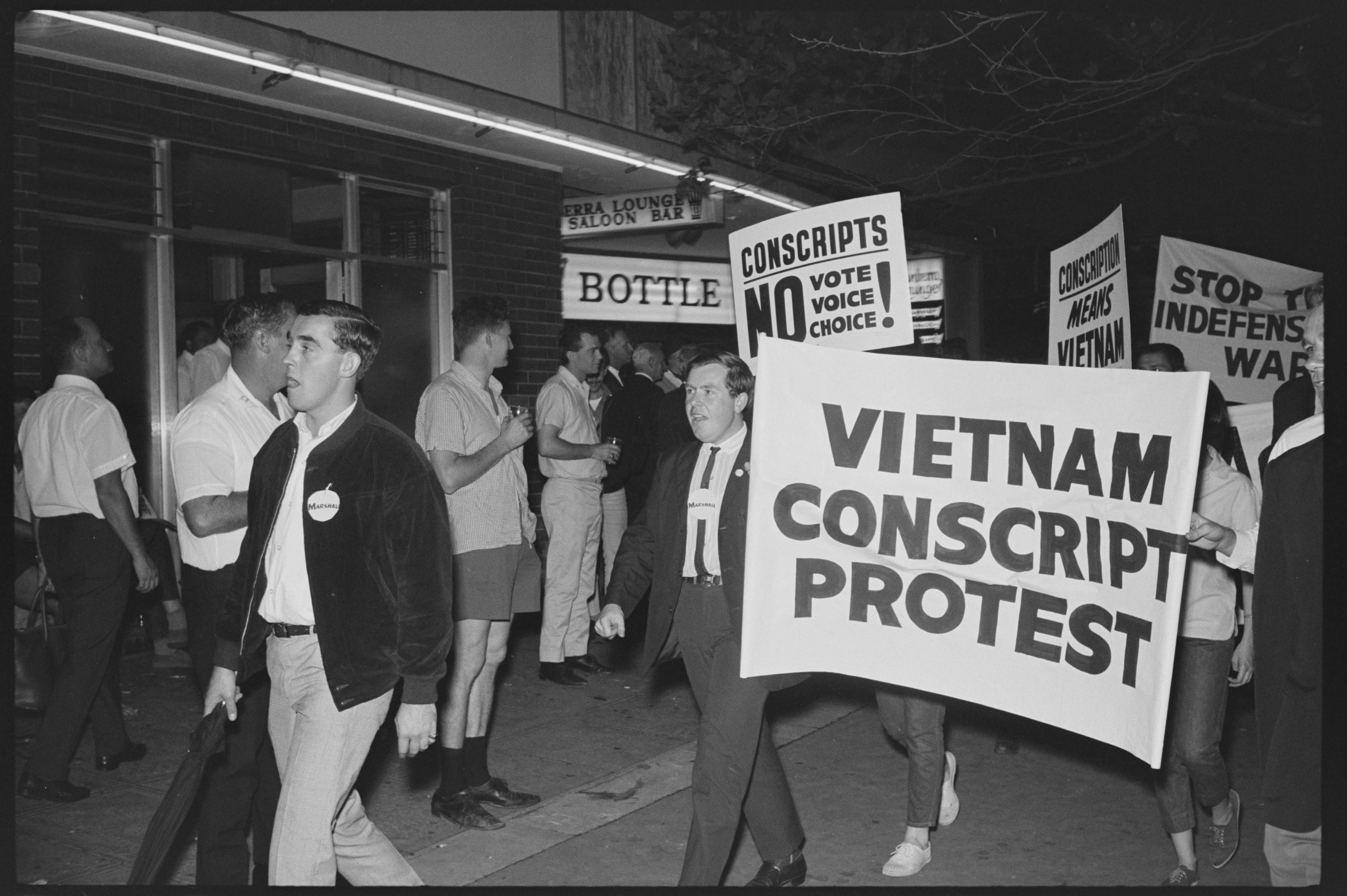
A demonstration against Vietnam War conscription at Martin Place & Garden Island Dock in Sydney, Australia, in 1966

The first draft lottery since World War II in the United States was held on December 1, 1969, and was met with large protests and a great deal of controversy; statistical analysis indicated that the methodology of the lotteries unintentionally disadvantaged men with late-year birthdays.

Various anti-war groups, such as Another Mother for Peace, WILPF, and WSP, had free draft counseling centers, where they gave young American men advice for legally and illegally evading the draft.

Over 30,000 people left the country and went to Canada, Sweden, and Mexico to avoid the draft. The Japanese anti-war group Beheiren helped some American soldiers to desert and hide from the military in Japan.

To gain an exemption or deferment, many men attended college, though they had to remain in college until their 26th birthday to be certain of avoiding the draft. Some men were rejected by the military as 4-F unfit for service failing to meet physical, mental, or moral standards. Still others joined the National Guard or entered the Peace Corps as a way of avoiding Vietnam. All of these issues raised concerns about the fairness of who was selected for involuntary service, since it was often the poor or those without connections who were drafted. Ironically, in light of modern political issues, a certain exemption was a convincing claim of homosexuality, but very few men attempted this because of the stigma involved. Also, a conviction for certain crimes earned an exclusion, the topic of the anti-war song "Alice's Restaurant" by Arlo Guthrie.

Even many of those who never received a deferment or exemption never served, simply because the pool of eligible men was so large compared to the number required for service, that the draft boards never got around to drafting them, when a new crop of men became available (until 1969), or because they had high lottery numbers (1970 and later).

Of those soldiers who served during the war, there was increasing opposition to the conflict amongst GIs, which resulted in fragging and many other activities which hampered the US's ability to wage war effectively.

Most of those subjected to the draft were too young to vote or drink in most states, and the image of young people being forced to risk their lives in the military without the right of enfranchisement or the ability to drink alcohol legally also successfully pressured legislators to lower the voting age nationally and the drinking age in many states.

Student opposition groups on many college and university campuses seized campus administration offices and in several instances forced the expulsion of ROTC programs from the campus.

Some Americans who were not subject to the draft protested the conscription of their tax dollars for the war effort. War tax resistance, once mostly isolated to solitary anarchists like Henry David Thoreau and religious pacifists like the Quakers, became a more mainstream protest tactic. As of 1972, an estimated 200,000–500,000 people were refusing to pay the excise taxes on their telephone bills, and another 20,000 were resisting part or all of their income tax bills. Among the tax resisters were Joan Baez and Noam Chomsky.

=== Environmentalists ===
Momentum from the protest organizations and the impact of the war on the environment became the focal point of issues to an overwhelmingly main force for the growth of an environmental movement in the United States. Many of the environment-oriented demonstrations were inspired by Rachel Carson's 1962 book Silent Spring, which warned of the harmful effects of pesticide use on the Earth. For demonstrators, Carson's warnings coincided with the United States' use of chemicals in Vietnam such as Agent Orange, a chemical compound that was used to clear forestry used as cover by the Viet Cong, initially conducted by the United States Air Force in Operation Ranch Hand in 1962.

=== Mexican-Americans ===
Along with Asian and African Americans, Mexican-Americans also made significant contributions to the anti-war effort in the United States. The Chicano Moratorium march where 20–30 thousand activists took to the streets of eastern Los Angeles to protest the Vietnam War. The main cause of their opposition and disapproval of the war stemmed from the fact that there was a disproportionate amount of Mexican-American troops killed or injured in the war compared to the amount living in the United States. Moreover, Mexican-Americans had disparities in public education, were excluded from higher education, and had abnormally high unemployment rates, and as a result many joined the war effort seeing no other option, contributing to the fact that Mexican-Americans died at twice the rate of any other group in Vietnam.

Elaborating upon the Chicano Moratorium March, it began as a peaceful march, but shifted into violence after the Los Angeles County Sheriff's Department arrived at the scene, assaulting the protestors with tear gas and billy clubs and ultimately killing three while injuring many more. One of those killed during the protest was LA Times journalist Rubén Salazar, who eventually had Laguna Park named after him, the Rubén Salazar Park, to honor the journalist. Overall, this movement not only brought different members of Mexican-American society together, but it further broke down racial barriers as African-Americans, Asian-Americans, and white individuals all felt a common anxiety about the war, and came together to protest. Other specific groups of Latinos also banded together, but Mexican-Americans were the largest group to protest due to the high amount being sent to war.

=== Musicians and songs ===
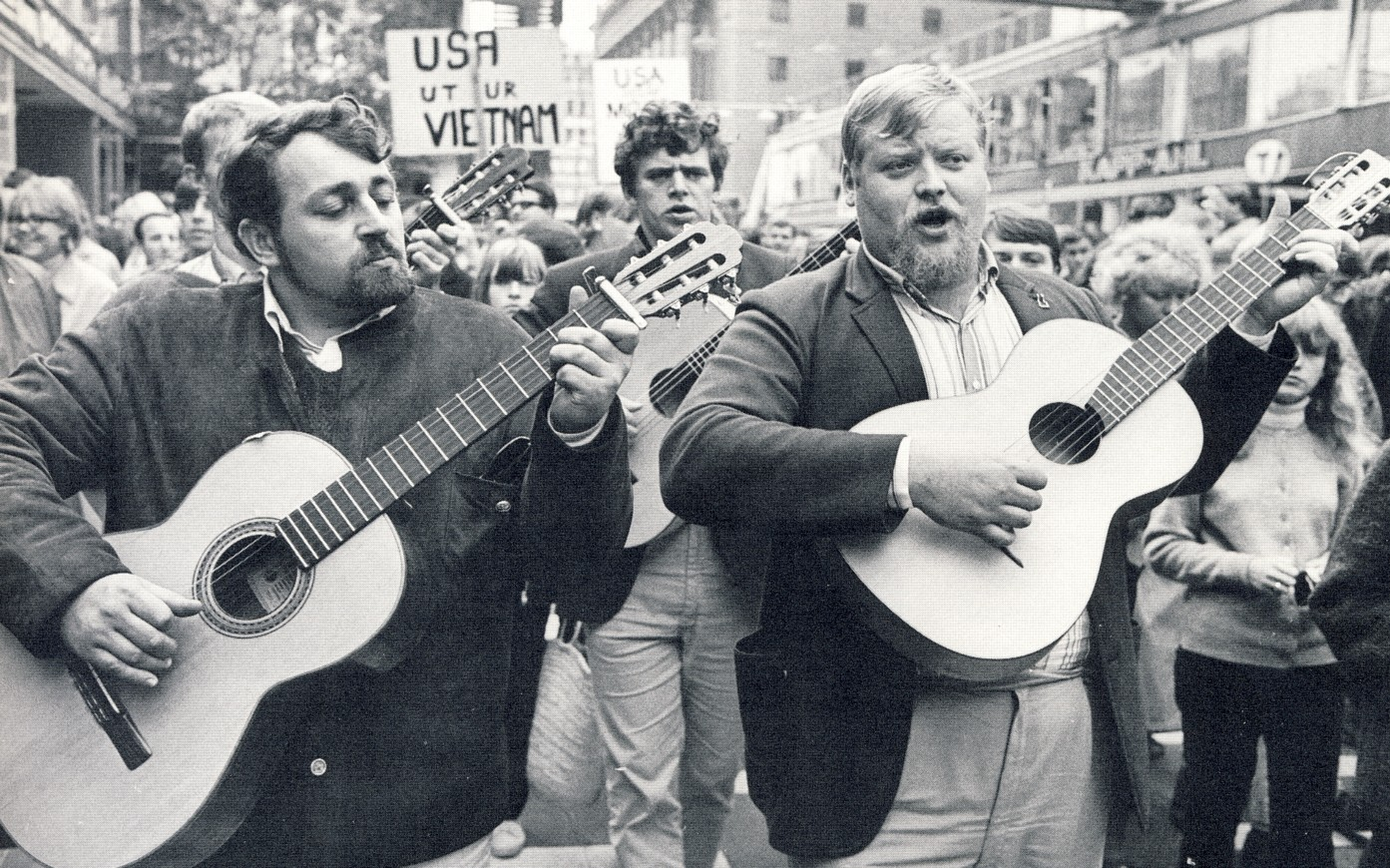
Cornelis Vreeswijk, Fred Åkerström, and Gösta Cervin at a protest march against the Vietnam War in Stockholm in 1965

Waist Deep in the Big Muddy; the Big Fool said to push on.

— Pete Seeger, 1963/1967

Protest of American participation in the Vietnam War was a movement in which many popular musicians participated, a stark contrast to the pro-war compositions of artists during World War II. The musicians included Joni Mitchell, Joan Baez, Phil Ochs, Lou Harrison, Gail Kubik, William Mayer, Elie Siegmeister, Robert Fink, David Noon, Richard Wernick, and John W. Downey.

To date, over 5,000 Vietnam War-related songs have been recorded, and many took a patriotic, pro-government, or pro-soldier perspective. The two most notable genres involved in this protest were rock and roll and folk music. While composers created pieces confronting the pro-war political camp, they were not limited to their music. Protesters were being arrested and were participating in peace marches, and popular musicians were among their ranks. This concept of intimate involvement reached new heights in May 1968 when the "Composers and Musicians for Peace" concert was staged in New York. As the war continued, along with the new media coverage, the movement snowballed, and popular music reflected this. As early as the summer of 1965, music-based protests against the American involvement in Southeast Asia began with works like P. F. Sloan's folk rock song Eve of Destruction, recorded by Barry McGuire as one of the earliest musical protests against the Vietnam War.

A key figure in the rock music community of the anti-war spectrum was Jimi Hendrix (1942–1970). Hendrix had a huge following among the youth culture exploring itself through drugs and experiencing itself through rock music. He was not an official protester of the war; one of Hendrix's biographers contends that Hendrix, being a former soldier, sympathized with the anticommunist view. He did, however, protest the violence that took place in the Vietnam War. With the song "Machine Gun", dedicated to those fighting in Vietnam, this protest of violence is manifest. David Henderson, author of 'Scuse Me While I Kiss the Sky, describes the song as "scary funk ... his sound over the drone shifts from a woman's scream, to a siren, to a fighter plane diving, all amid Buddy Miles' Gatling-gun snare shots. ... he says 'evil man make me kill you ... make you kill me although we're only families apart.'" This song was often accompanied by pleas from Hendrix to bring the soldiers back home and cease the bloodshed. While Hendrix's views may not have been analogous to the protesters, his songs became anthems to the antiwar movement. Songs such as "Star Spangled Banner" showed individuals that "you can love your country, but hate the government." Hendrix's anti-violence efforts are summed up in his words: "when the power of love overcomes the love of power ... the world will know peace." Thus, Hendrix's personal views did not coincide perfectly with those of the anti-war protesters; however, his anti-violence outlook was a driving force during the years of the Vietnam War even after his death (1970).

The song known to many as the anthem of the protest movement was "The "Fish" Cheer/I-Feel-Like-I'm-Fixin'-to-Die Rag" – first released on an EP in the October 1965 issue of Rag Baby – by Country Joe and the Fish, one of the most successful protest bands. Although this song was not on music charts probably because it was too radical, it was performed at many public events including the famous Woodstock music festival (1969). "Feel-Like-I'm-Fixin'-To-Die Rag" was a song that used sarcasm to communicate the problems with not only the war but also the public's naïve attitudes towards it. It was said that "the happy beat and insouciance of the vocalist are in odd juxtaposition to the lyrics that reinforce the sad fact that the American public was being forced into realizing that Vietnam was no longer a remote place on the other side of the world, and the damage it was doing to the country could no longer be considered collateral, involving someone else."

Along with singer-songwriter Phil Ochs, who attended and organized anti-war events and wrote such songs as "I Ain't Marching Any More" and "The War Is Over", another key historical figure of the antiwar movement was Bob Dylan. Folk and Rock were critical aspects of the counterculture during the Vietnam War both were genres that Dylan would dabble in. His success in writing protest songs came from his pre-existing popularity, as he did not initially intend on doing so. Todd Gitlin, a leader of a student movement at the time, was quoted in saying "Whether he liked it or not, Dylan sang for us. ... We followed his career as if he were singing our songs." The anthem "Blowin' in the Wind" embodied Dylan's anti-war, pro-civil rights sentiment. To complement "Blowin' in the Wind" Dylan's song "The Times they are A-Changin' " alludes to a new method of governing that is necessary and warns those who currently participate in government that the change is imminent. Dylan tells the "senators and congressmen [to] please heed the call." Dylan's songs were designed to awaken the public and to cause a reaction. The protesters of the Vietnam War identified their cause so closely with the artistic compositions of Dylan that Joan Baez and Judy Collins performed "The Times they are A-Changin' " at a march protesting the Vietnam War (1965) and also for President Johnson. While Dylan renounced the idea of subscribing to the ideals of one individual, his feelings of protest towards Vietnam were appropriated by the general movement and they "awaited his gnomic yet oracular pronouncements", which provided a guiding aspect to the movement as a whole.

John Lennon, former member of the Beatles, did most of his activism in his solo career with wife, Yoko Ono. Given his immense fame due to the success of the Beatles, he was a very prominent movement figure with the constant media and press attention. Still being proactive on their honeymoon, the newlyweds controversially held a sit-in, where they sat in bed for a week answering press questions. They held numerous sit-ins, one where they first introduced their song "Give Peace a Chance." Lennon and Ono's song overshadowed many previous held anthems, as it became known as the ultimate anthem of peace in the 1970s, with their words "all we are saying ... is give peace a chance" being sung globally.

=== Military members and veterans ===
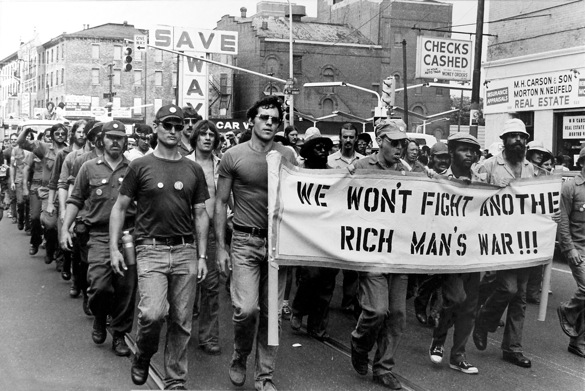
Protesters affiliated with Vietnam Veterans Against the War in Philadelphia during the United States Bicentennial

Within the United States military, various service members would organize to avoid military duties, and individual actors would also carry out their own acts of resistance. The movement consisted of the self-organizing of active duty members and veterans in collaboration with civilian peace activists. By 1971 the United States military would become so demoralized that the military would have severe difficulties properly waging war.

=== Students ===
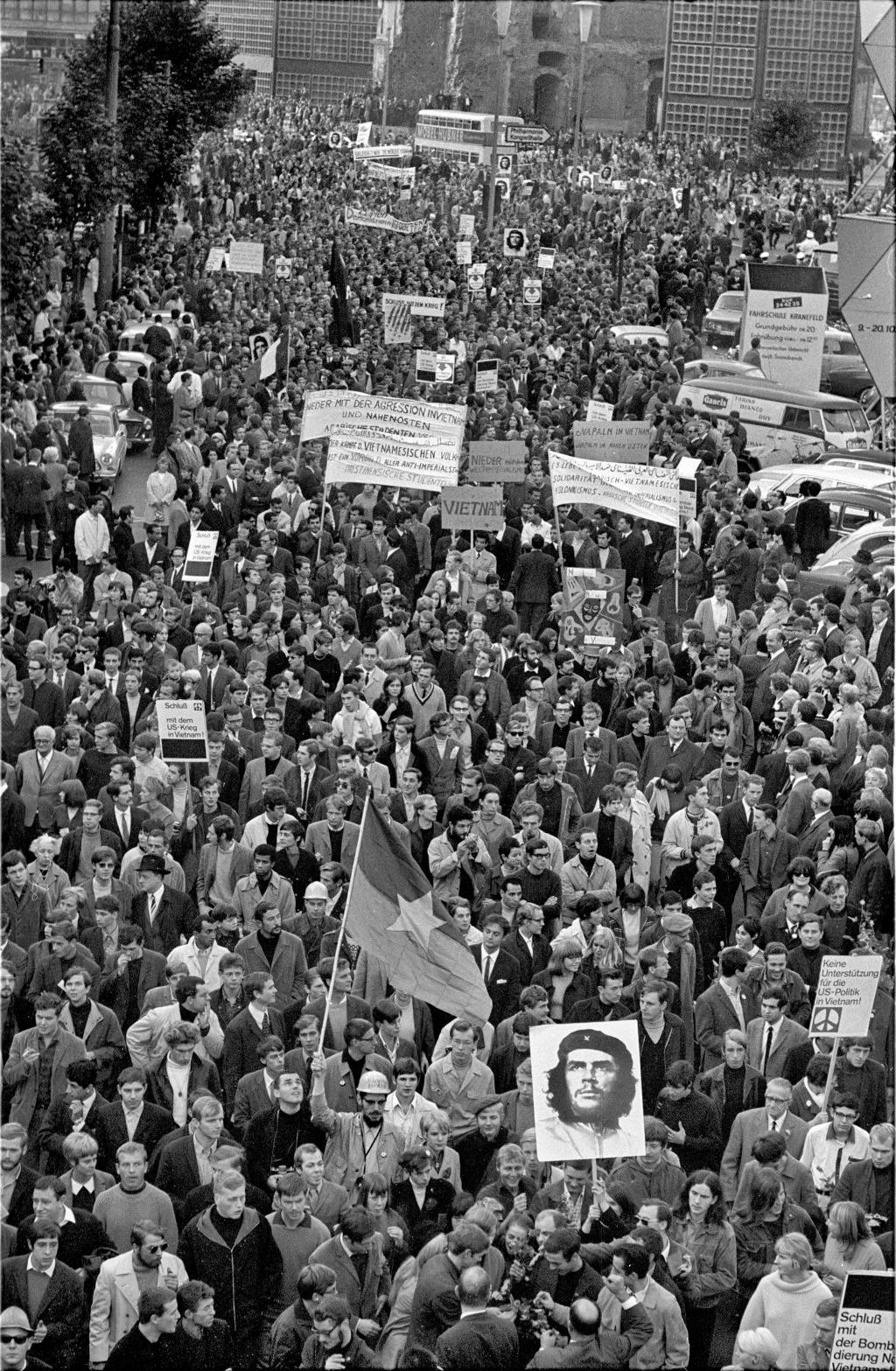
West German students protest against the Vietnam War in 1968

There was a great deal of civic unrest on college campuses throughout the 1960s as students became increasingly involved in the Civil Rights Movement, Second Wave Feminism, and anti-war movement. Doug McAdam explains the success of the mass mobilization of volunteers for Freedom Summer in terms of "Biographical Availability", where individuals must have a certain degree of social, economic, and psychological freedom to be able to participate in large scale social movements. This explanation can also be applied to the Anti-War Movement because it occurred around the same time and the same biographical factors applied to the college-aged anti-war protesters. David Meyers (2007) also explains how the concept of personal efficacy affects mass movement mobilization. For example, according to Meyers' thesis, consider that American wealth increased drastically after World War II. At this time, America was a superpower and enjoyed great affluence after thirty years of depression, war, and sacrifice. Benjamin T. Harrison (2000) argues that the post World War II affluence set the stage for the protest generation in the 1960s. His central thesis is that the World Wars and Great Depression spawned a 'Beat Generation' refusing to conform to mainstream American values which lead to the emergence of the Hippies and the counterculture.

The Anti-war movement became part of a larger protest movement against the traditional American Values and attitudes. Meyers (2007) builds off this claim in his argument that the "relatively privileged enjoy the education and affirmation that afford them the belief that they might make a difference." As a result of the present factors in terms of affluence, biographical availability (defined in the sociological areas of activism as the lack of restrictions on social relationships of which most likely increases the consequences of participating in a social movement), and increasing political atmosphere across the county, political activity increased drastically on college campuses. In one instance, John William Ward, then president of Amherst College, sat down in front of Westover Air Force Base near Chicopee, Massachusetts, along with 1000 students, some faculty, and his wife Barbara to protest against Richard Nixon's escalation of offensive bombing in Southeast Asia.

College enrollment reached 9 million by the end of the 1960s. Colleges and universities in America had more students than ever before, and these institutions often tried to restrict student behavior to maintain order on the campuses. To combat this, many college students became active in causes that promoted free speech, student input in the curriculum, and an end to archaic social restrictions. Students joined the anti-war movement because they did not want to fight in a foreign civil war that they believed did not concern them or because they were morally opposed to all war. Others disliked the war because it diverted funds and attention away from problems in the US Intellectual growth and gaining a liberal perspective at college caused many students to become active in the anti-war movement.

Another attractive feature of the opposition movement was the fact that it was a popular social event. Most student anti-war organisations were locally or campus-based, including chapters of the very loosely coordinated Students for a Democratic Society, because they were easier to organize and participate in than national groups. Common anti-war demonstrations for college students featured attempts to sever ties between the war machine and universities through burning draft cards, protesting universities furnishing grades to draft boards, and protesting military and Dow Chemical job fairs on campus. From 1969 to 1970, student protesters attacked 197 ROTC buildings on college campuses.

On May 4, 1970, the Ohio National Guard was opened fire on students demonstrating against the war at Kent State University, killing 4 and wounding 9. At the same time, there were sit-ins and anti-war riots at Ohio University, even more intense than those of Kent State. This was partly due to the administration's refusal to close the university; instead of going home, many students from other Ohio universities that did close came to Athens, Ohio to protest further. When the Ohio National Guard was called in to Athens, there was a 3-hour battle at the Baker University Center (its student union), resulting in 23 injured and 54 arrested students. On May 15, the campus of Ohio University was closed. Protests grew after the Kent State shootings, radicalizing more and more students nationally. Although the media often portrayed the student antiwar movement as aggressive and widespread, only 10% of the 2500 colleges in the United States had violent protests throughout the Vietnam War years. By the early 1970s, most student protest movements died down due to President Nixon's de-escalation of the war, the economic downturn, and disillusionment with the powerlessness of the anti-war movement.

=== Women ===
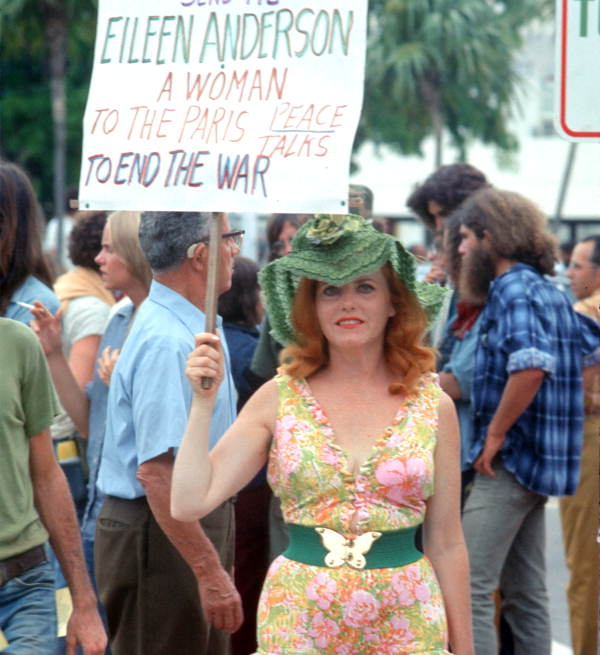
A woman protesting the Vietnam War during the 1972 Republican National Convention in Miami Beach, Florida

Women were a large part of the anti-war movement, even though they were sometimes relegated to second-class status within the organizations or faced sexism within opposition groups. Some leaders of anti-war groups viewed women as sex objects or secretaries, not actual thinkers who could contribute positively and tangibly to the group's goals, or believed that women could not truly understand and join the anti-war movement because they were unaffected by the draft. Women involved in opposition groups disliked the romanticism of the violence of both the war and the anti-war movement that was common amongst male war protesters. Despite the inequalities, participation in various antiwar groups allowed women to gain experience with organizing protests and crafting effective anti-war rhetoric. These newfound skills combined with their dislike of sexism within the opposition movement caused many women to break away from the mainstream anti-war movement and create or join women's anti-war groups, such as Another Mother for Peace, Women's International League for Peace and Freedom (WILPF), and Women Strike for Peace (WSP), also known as Women For Peace. Female soldiers serving in Vietnam joined the movement to battle the war and sexism, racism, and the established military bureaucracy by writing articles for anti-war and anti-military newspapers.

Mothers and older generations of women joined the opposition movement, as advocates for peace and people opposed to the effects of the war and the draft on the generation of young men. These women saw the draft as one of the most disliked parts of the war machine and sought to undermine the war itself through undermining the draft. Another Mother for Peace and WSP often held free draft counseling centers to give young men legal and illegal methods to oppose the draft. Members of Women For Peace showed up at the White House every Sunday for 8 years from 11 to 1 for a peace vigil. Such female antiwar groups often relied on maternalism, the image of women as peaceful caretakers of the world, to express and accomplish their goals. The government often saw middle-aged women involved in such organizations as the most dangerous members of the opposition movement because they were ordinary citizens who quickly and efficiently mobilized.

Many black mothers also joined and headed organizations such as the National Welfare Rights Organisation (NWRO). The NWRO, set up in 1967, critiqued the government spending budget for the Vietnam War instead of providing families domestically, decried the sending of poor men and their sons to fight in the Vietnam War, linked capitalism and the prioritization of corporations and military spending over human needs, invoked the image of the mother, and highlighted the impact of poverty and military participation on women, particularly black mothers. As well as this, they criticized the conflict for harming impoverished women, forcing them to supply labor and troops while raising children without proper pay.

In 1971, the Third World Women's Alliance (TWWA) expanded the NWRO's reach by including black, Puerto Rican, Chicana, Asian, and Indigenous women. The TWWA, organized against the Vietnam War from an internationalist and anti-imperialist perspective, linked the cost of US wars abroad to the exploitation of poor communities of color domestically, highlighted how the draft disproportionately impacted families of minorities by taking sons and leaving women behind, supported oppressed peoples rising up against their oppressors, and took inspiration from Vietnamese women fighters.

Both the NWRO and TWWA actively connected opposition to the Vietnam War to broader critiques of economic injustice and militarism, emphasizing their profound impact on women and families. These groups pioneered expansive and inclusive anti-war activism, focusing on the specific challenges faced by women of color.

Many women in America sympathized with the Vietnamese civilians affected by the war and joined the opposition movement. They protested the use of napalm, a highly flammable jelly weapon created by the Dow Chemical Company and used as a weapon during the war, by boycotting Saran Wrap, another product made by the company.

Faced with the sexism sometimes found in the antiwar movement, New Left, and Civil Rights Movement, some women created their own organizations to establish true equality of the sexes. Some of frustrations of younger women became apparent during the anti-war movement: they desired more radical change and decreased acceptance of societal gender roles than older women activists. Female activists' disillusion with the anti-war movement led to the formation of the Women's Liberation Movement to establish true equality for American women in all facets of life.

=== Trade Unionists ===
By the time the United States entered Vietnam union leadership in the AFL-CIO publicly supported the war. This was because the Taft–Hartley Act of 1947 forbade radicals, such as communists, from being elected to central positions in the union. However, many smaller unions protested the war heavily. Local 1199 of the Drug and Hospital Workers Union, located in New York, actively protested the war. They signed a proclamation in a convention held in 1964 denouncing US involvement in Vietnam. Other unions, such as the International Longshoremen and Warehousemen's Union signed similar proclamations in 1965. Antiwar activism was not limited to independent unions. AFL-CIO affiliated unions like the United Auto Workers and the Teamsters broke with AFL-CIO leadership in 1969 to form an antiwar alliance of unions. International leadership of the Teamsters participated in antiwar protests into the 1970s, including a large one, numbering over 250,000 protesters, held on April 25, 1971, in Washington, D.C.

Antiwar union leadership worked heavily with student organizations like the Students for a Democratic Society (SDS) and the National Committee for Sane Nuclear Policy (SANE). Trade Unionists for Peace was an antiwar organization formed in Detroit, Michigan, on March 6, 1966. It was soon after reorganized into the Trade Union Division (TUD) of SANE. It organized protests in conjunction with the SDS and local unions in several different cities including New York City, Los Angeles, and San Francisco. In 1967 the TUD held a convention at the University of Chicago with the AFL-CIO. The result of the convention produced a new organization, the Labor Leadership Assembly for Peace. This organization largely took the role that the TUD had previously played, making it obsolete. However one year later in 1968 the coalition between the AFL-CIO and TUD disintegrated over disagreements on US involvement in Vietnam. This disagreement primarily arose out of the AFL-CIO's reluctance to take a radically antiwar position.

== Political responses ==
=== United Nations intervention ===
In October 1967, the Senate Foreign Relations Committee held hearings on resolutions urging President Johnson to request an emergency session of the United Nations security council to consider proposals for ending the war.

=== Dellums (war crimes hearings) ===
In January 1971, just weeks into his first term, Congressman Ron Dellums set up a Vietnam war crimes exhibit in an annex to his Congressional office. The exhibit featured four large posters depicting atrocities committed by American soldiers embellished with red paint. This was followed shortly thereafter by four days of hearings on "war crimes" in Vietnam, which began April 25. Dellums, assisted by the Citizens Commission of Inquiry, had called for formal investigations into the allegations, but Congress chose not to endorse these proceedings. As such, the hearings were ad hoc and only informational in nature. As a condition of room use, press and camera presence were not permitted, but the proceedings were transcribed.

In addition to Ron Dellums (Dem-CA), an additional 19 Congressional representatives took part in the hearings, including: Bella Abzug (Dem-NY), Shirley Chisholm (Dem-NY), Patsy Mink (Dem-HI), Parren Mitchell (Dem-MD), John Conyers (Dem-MI), Herman Badillo (Dem-NY), James Abourezk (Dem-SD), Leo Ryan (Dem-CA), Phillip Burton (Dem-CA), Don Edwards (Dem-CA), Pete McCloskey (Rep-CA), Ed Koch (Dem-NY), John Seiberling (Dem-OH), Henry Reuss (Dem-WI), Benjamin Stanley Rosenthal (Dem-NY), Robert Kastenmeier (Dem-WI), and Abner J. Mikva (Dem-IL).

The transcripts describe alleged details of US military's conduct in Vietnam. Some tactics were described as "gruesome", such as the severing of ears from corpses to verify body count. Others involved the killing of civilians. Soldiers claimed to have ordered artillery strikes on villages which did not appear to have any military presence. Soldiers were claimed to use racist terms such as "gooks", "dinks" and "slant eyes" when referring to the Vietnamese.

Witnesses described that legal, by-the-book instruction was augmented by more questionable training by non-commissioned officers as to how soldiers should conduct themselves. One witness testified about "free-fire zones", areas as large as 80 square miles (210 km^{2}) in which soldiers were free to shoot any Vietnamese they encountered after curfew without first making sure they were hostile. Allegations of exaggeration of body count, torture, murder and general abuse of civilians and the psychology and motivations of soldiers and officers were discussed at length.

=== Fulbright (end to war) ===
In April and May 1971, the Senate Foreign Relations Committee, chaired by Senator J. William Fulbright, held a series of 22 hearings (referred to as the Fulbright Hearings) on proposals relating to ending the war. On the third day of the hearings, April 22, 1971, future Senator and 2004 presidential candidate John Kerry became the first Vietnam veteran to testify before Congress in opposition to the war. Speaking on behalf of Vietnam Veterans Against the War, he argued for the immediate, unilateral withdrawal of US forces from Vietnam. During nearly two hours of discussions with committee members, Kerry related in some detail the findings of the Winter Soldier Investigation, in which veterans had described personally committing or witnessing atrocities and war crimes.

== Public opinion ==
The American public's support of the Vietnam War decreased as the war continued on. As public support decreased, opposition grew.

The Gallup News Service began asking the American public whether it was a "mistake to send troops to Vietnam" in August 1965. At the time, less than a quarter of Americans polled, 24%, believed it was a mistake to send troops to Vietnam, while 60% of Americans polled believed the opposite. Three years later, in September 1968, 54% of Americans polled believed it was a mistake to send troops to Vietnam, while 37% believed it was not a mistake.

A 1965 Gallup Poll asked the question, "Have you ever felt the urge to organize or join a public demonstration about something?" Positive responses were quite low; not many people wanted to protest anything, and those who did want to show a public demonstration often wanted to demonstrate in support of the Vietnam War. However, when the American Public was asked in 1990, "Looking back, do you wish that you had made a stronger effort to protest or demonstrate against the Vietnam War, or not", 25 percent said they wished they had.

Urge to Organize or Demonstrate	Yes %	No %
US adults	10	90
21 to 29 years old	15	85
30 to 49 years	12	88
50 and older	6	94
College graduates	21	79
High school graduates	9	91
High school nongraduates	5	95
Gallup, Oct. 29 – Nov. 2, 1965

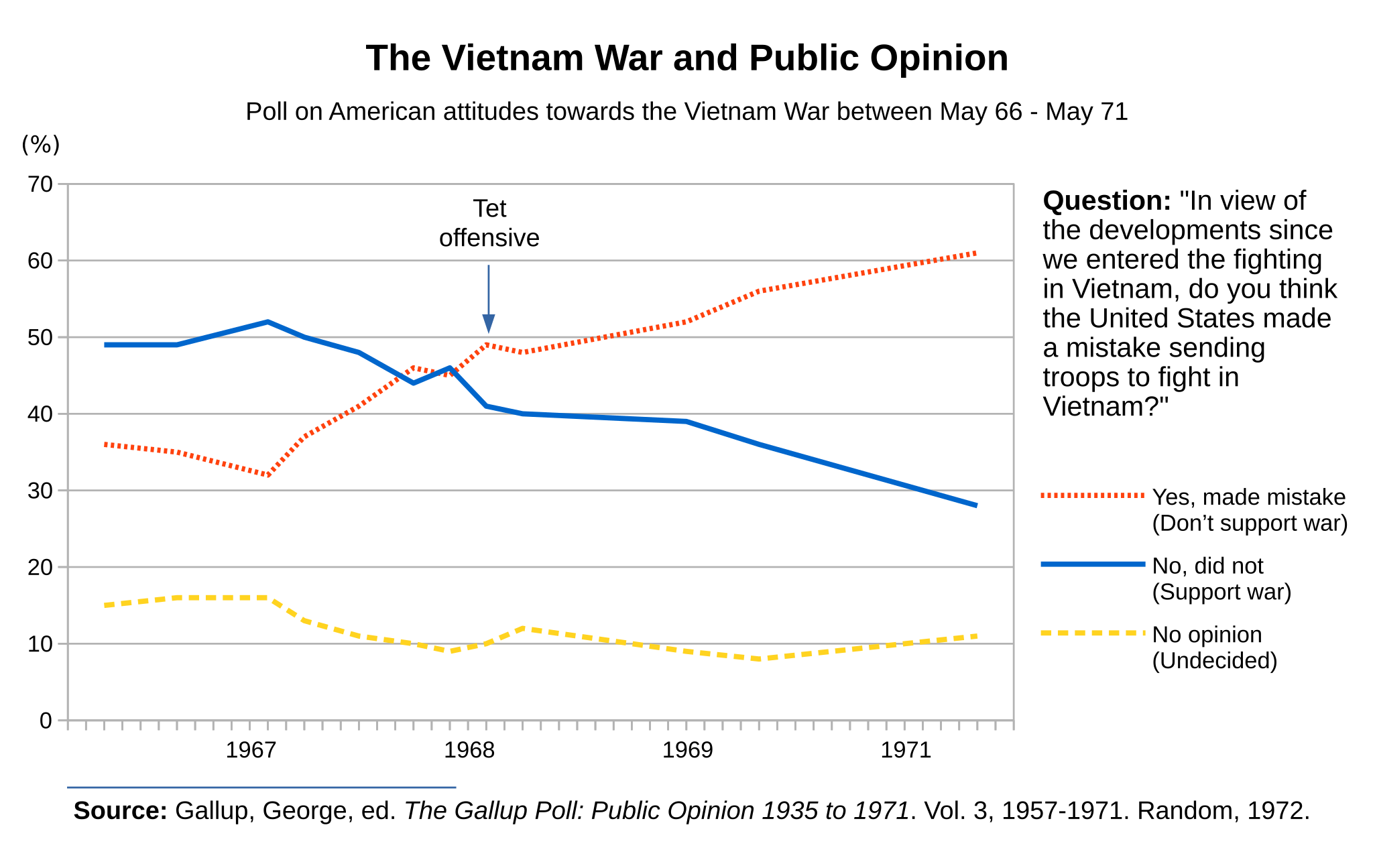
Attitudes of US citizens towards the Vietnam War between May 1966 and May 1971, according to public opinion polls

A major factor in the American public's disapproval of the Vietnam War was the numbers of casualties being inflicted on US forces. In a Harris poll from 1967 asking what aspect most troubled people most about the Vietnam War the plurality answer of 31% was "the loss of our young men." A separate 1967 Harris poll asked the American public how the war affected their family, job or financial life. The majority of respondents, 55%, said that it had had no effect on their lives. Of the 45% who indicated the war had affected their lives, 32% listed inflation as the most important factor, while 25% listed casualties inflicted.

As the war continued, the public became much more opposed to the war, seeing that it was not ending. In a poll from December 1967, 71% of the public believed the war would not be settled in 1968. A year later the same question was asked and 55% of people did not think the war would be settled in 1969.

When the American public was asked about the Vietnam-era Anti-War movement in the 1990s, 39% of the public said they approved, while 39% said they disapproved. The last 22% were unsure.

== General effects ==
The opposition to the United States' involvement in the Vietnam War had many effects, which arguably led to the eventual end of the involvement of the United States. The historian Howard Zinn states in his book A People's History of the United States that, "in the course of the war, there developed in the United States the greatest anti-war movement the nation had ever experienced, a movement that played a critical role in bringing the war to an end."

An alternative point of view is expressed by Michael Lind. Citing public polling data on protests during the war he claimed that: "The American public turned against the Vietnam War not because it was persuaded by the radical and liberal left that it was unjust, but out of sensitivity to its rising costs."

=== Fewer soldiers ===
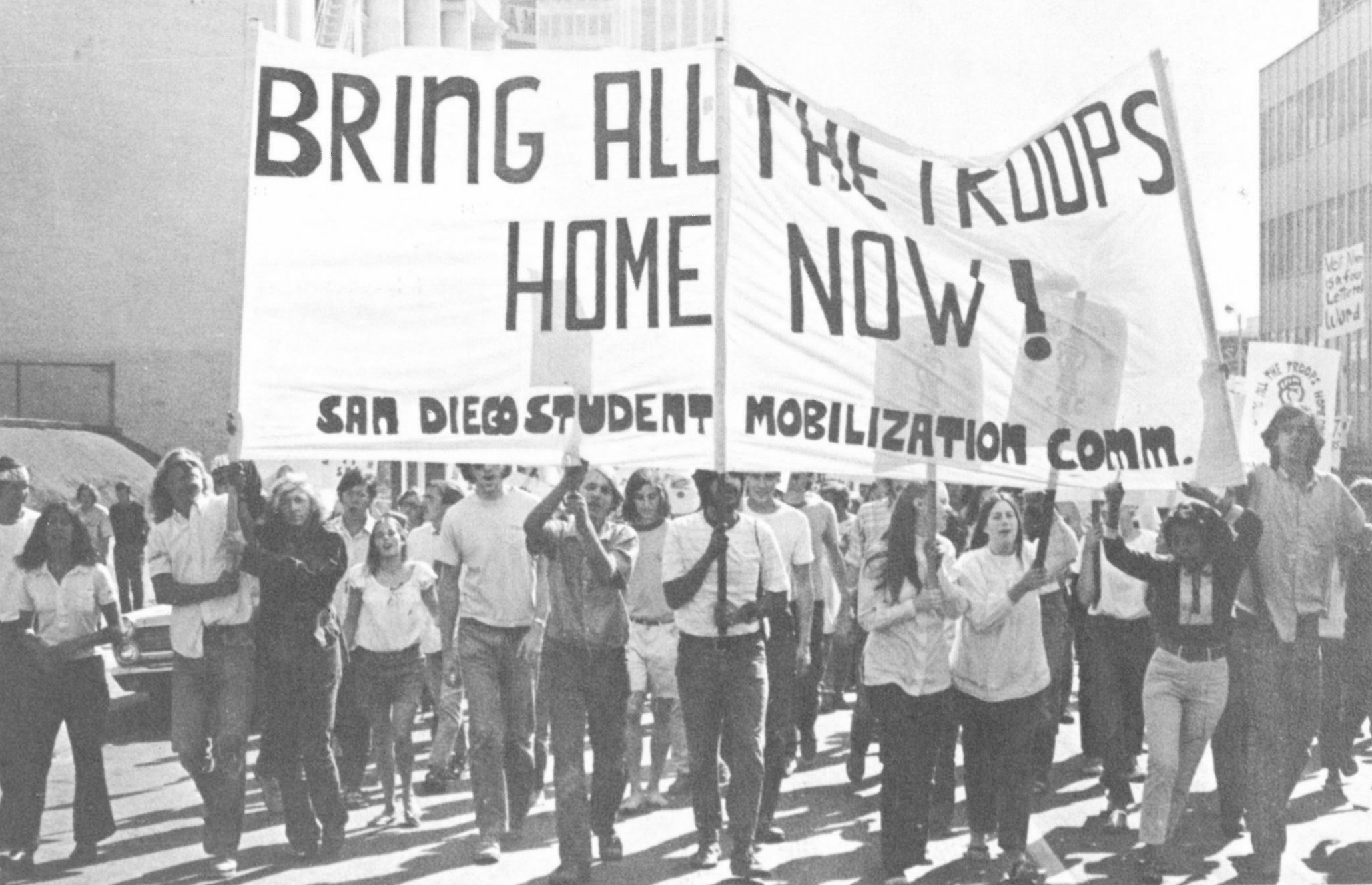
Students at the University of San Diego, holding a sign saying "bring all the troops home now!", in 1971

The first effect of the opposition movement that led to the end of the war was that fewer soldiers were available for the army. The draft was protested and even ROTC programs too. Howard Zinn first provides a note written by a student of Boston University on May 1, 1968, which stated to his draft board, "I have absolutely no intention to report for that exam, or for induction, or to aid in any way the American war effort against the people of Vietnam ..." The opposition to the United States' involvement in the Vietnam War had many effects, which led to the eventual end of the involvement of the United States. This refusal letter soon led to an overflow of refusals ultimately leading to the event provided by Zinn stating, "In May 1969 the Oakland induction center, where draftees reported from all of Northern California, reported that of 4,400 men ordered to report for induction, 2,400 did not show up. In the first quarter of 1970 the Selective Service System, for the first time, could not meet its quota."

The fewer numbers of soldiers as an effect of the opposition to the war also can be traced to the protests against the ROTC programs in colleges. Zinn argues this by stating, "Student protests against the ROTC resulted in the canceling of those programs in over forty colleges and universities. In 1966, 191,749 college students enrolled in ROTC. By 1973, the number was 72,459." The number of ROTC students in college drastically dropped and the program lost any momentum it once had before the anti-war movement.

=== Campus unrest ===
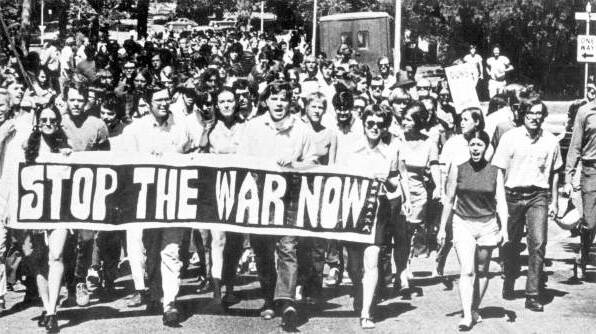
An anti–Vietnam War protest at Florida State University in 1970

A further effect of the opposition was that many college campuses were completely shut down due to protests. These protests led to wear on the government who tried to mitigate the tumultuous behavior and return the colleges back to normal. The colleges involved in the anti-war movement included ones such as, Brown University, Kent State University, and the University of Massachusetts. Even at The College of William and Mary unrest occurred with protests by the students and even some faculty members that resulted in "multiple informants" hired to report to the CIA on the activities of students and faculty members.

At the University of Massachusetts, "The 100th Commencement of the University of Massachusetts yesterday was a protest, a call for peace", "Red fists of protest, white peace symbols, and blue doves were stenciled on black academic gowns, and nearly every other senior wore an armband representing a plea for peace." Additionally, "At Boston College, a Catholic institution, six thousand people gathered that evening in the gymnasium to denounce the war." At Kent State University, "on May 4, when students gathered to demonstrate against the war, National Guardsmen fired into the crowd. Four students were killed." Four days later, on May 8, ten (some sources say eleven) people present at a demonstration that was a response to both the war in Vietnam and the Kent State massacre were bayoneted by National Guardsmen at the University of New Mexico. 131 were arrested. Finally, "At the Brown University commencement in 1969, two-thirds of the graduating class turned their backs when Henry Kissinger stood up to address them." Basically, from all of the evidence here provided by the historians, Zinn and McCarthy, the second effect was very prevalent and it was the uproar at many colleges and universities as an effect of the opposition to the United States' involvement in Vietnam.

=== Lowered military morale ===
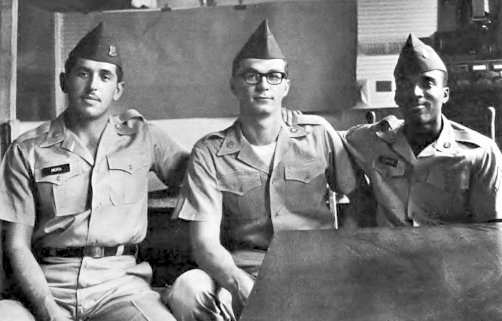
The Fort Hood Three, who refused deployment to Vietnam in 1966

Another effect the opposition to the war had was that the American soldiers in Vietnam began to side with the opposition and feel remorse for what they were doing. Zinn argues this with an example in which the soldiers in a POW camp formed a peace committee as they wondered who the enemy of the war was, because it certainly was not known among them. The statement of one of the soldiers reads:

Until we got to the first camp, we didn't see a village intact; they were all destroyed. I sat down and put myself in the middle and asked myself: Is this right or wrong? Is it right to destroy villages? Is it right to kill people en masse? After a while it just got to me.

Howard Zinn provides that piece of evidence to reiterate how all of this destruction and fighting against an enemy that seems to be unknown has been taking a toll on the soldiers and that they began to sense a feeling of opposition as one effect of the opposition occurring in the United States.

== Timeline ==
=== 1964 ===
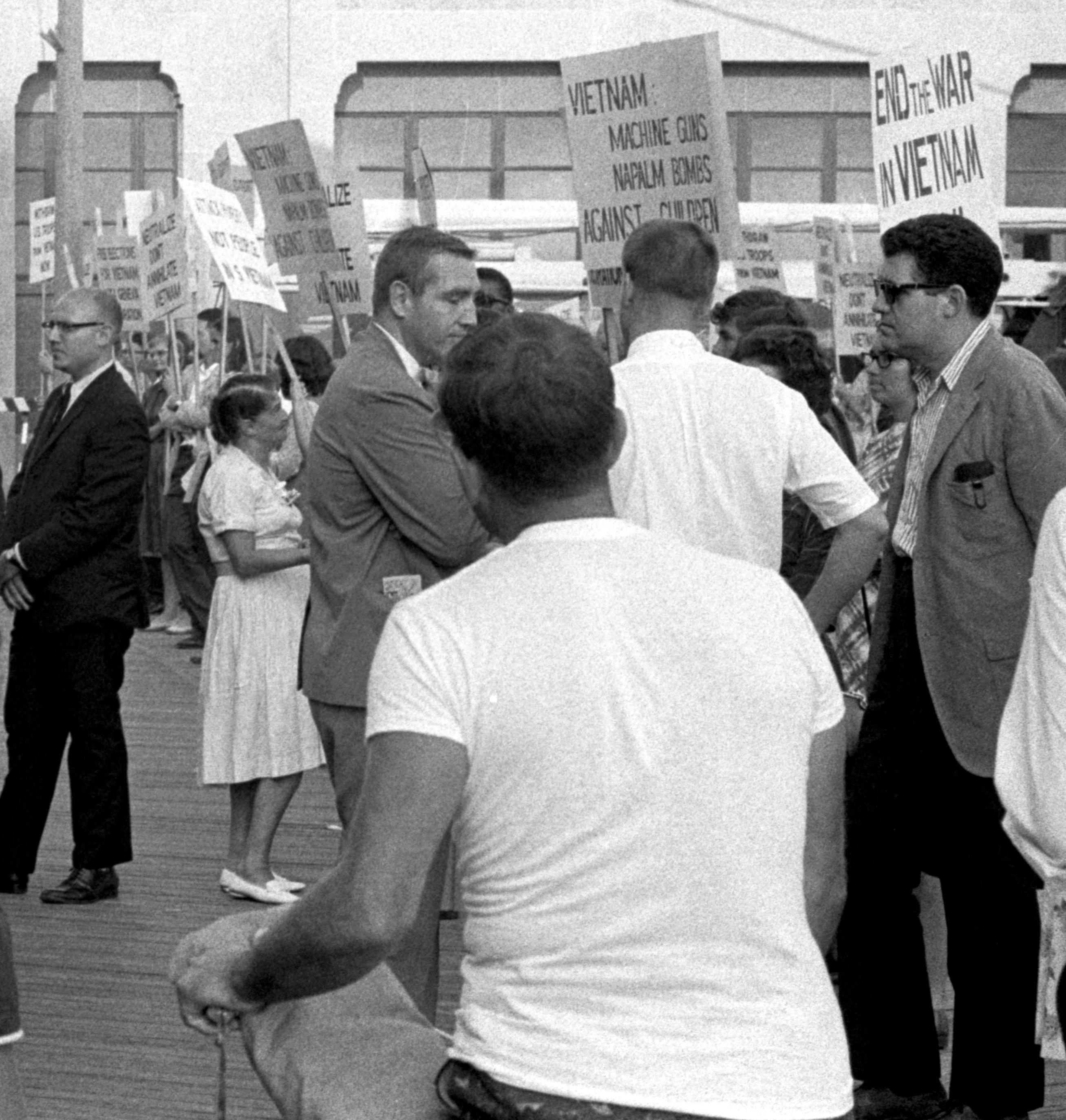
Anti–Vietnam War on the Atlantic City boardwalk during the 1964 Democratic National Convention

- May 12 – twelve young men in New York publicly burned their draft cards to protest the war.
- August – Prompted by the Gulf of Tonkin incident, Congress passed the Gulf of Tonkin Resolution.
- December – Joan Baez leads six hundred people in an anti-war demonstration in San Francisco.

=== 1965 ===
- March 24 – organized by professors against the war at the University of Michigan, a teach-in protest was attended by 2,500 participants. This model was to be repeated at 35 campuses across the country.
- March 16 – Alice Herz, an 82-year-old pacifist, set herself on fire in the first known act of self-immolation to protest the Vietnam War.
- April 17 – the Students for a Democratic Society (SDS) and the Student Nonviolent Coordinating Committee (SNCC), a civil rights activist group, led the first of several anti-war marches in Washington, D.C., with about 25,000 protesters.
- Draft-card burnings took place at University of California, Berkeley at student demonstrations in May organized by a new anti-war group, the Vietnam Day Committee. Events included a teach-in attended by 30,000, and the burning in effigy of president Lyndon B. Johnson.
- May – A Gallup poll showed 48% of US respondents felt the government was handling the war effectively, 28% felt the situation was being handled badly, and the rest had no opinion.
- May – First anti–Vietnam War demonstration in London was staged outside the US embassy.
- June – Protests were held on the steps of the Pentagon
- August – attempts were made by activists at Berkeley to stop the movement of trains carrying troops.
- Late August – A Gallup poll showed that 24% of Americans view sending troops to Vietnam as a mistake versus 60% who do not.
- Mid-October – the anti-war movement had significantly expanded to become a national and even global phenomenon, as anti-war protests drawing 100,000 were held simultaneously in as many as 80 major cities around the US, London, Paris, and Rome.
- October 15 – the first large scale act of civil disobedience in opposition to the Vietnam War occurred when approximately 40 people staged a sit-in at the Ann Arbor, Michigan draft board. They were sentenced to 10 to 15 days in jail.
- November 2 – Norman Morrison, a 31-year-old pacifist, set himself on fire below the third-floor window of Secretary of Defense Robert McNamara at the Pentagon, emulating the actions of the Vietnamese monk Thích Quảng Đức.
- November 27 – Coretta Scott King, SDS President Carl Oglesby, and Dr. Benjamin Spock, among others, spoke at an anti-war rally of about 30,000 in Washington, D.C., in the largest demonstration to date. Parallel protests occurred elsewhere around the nation.

=== 1966 ===
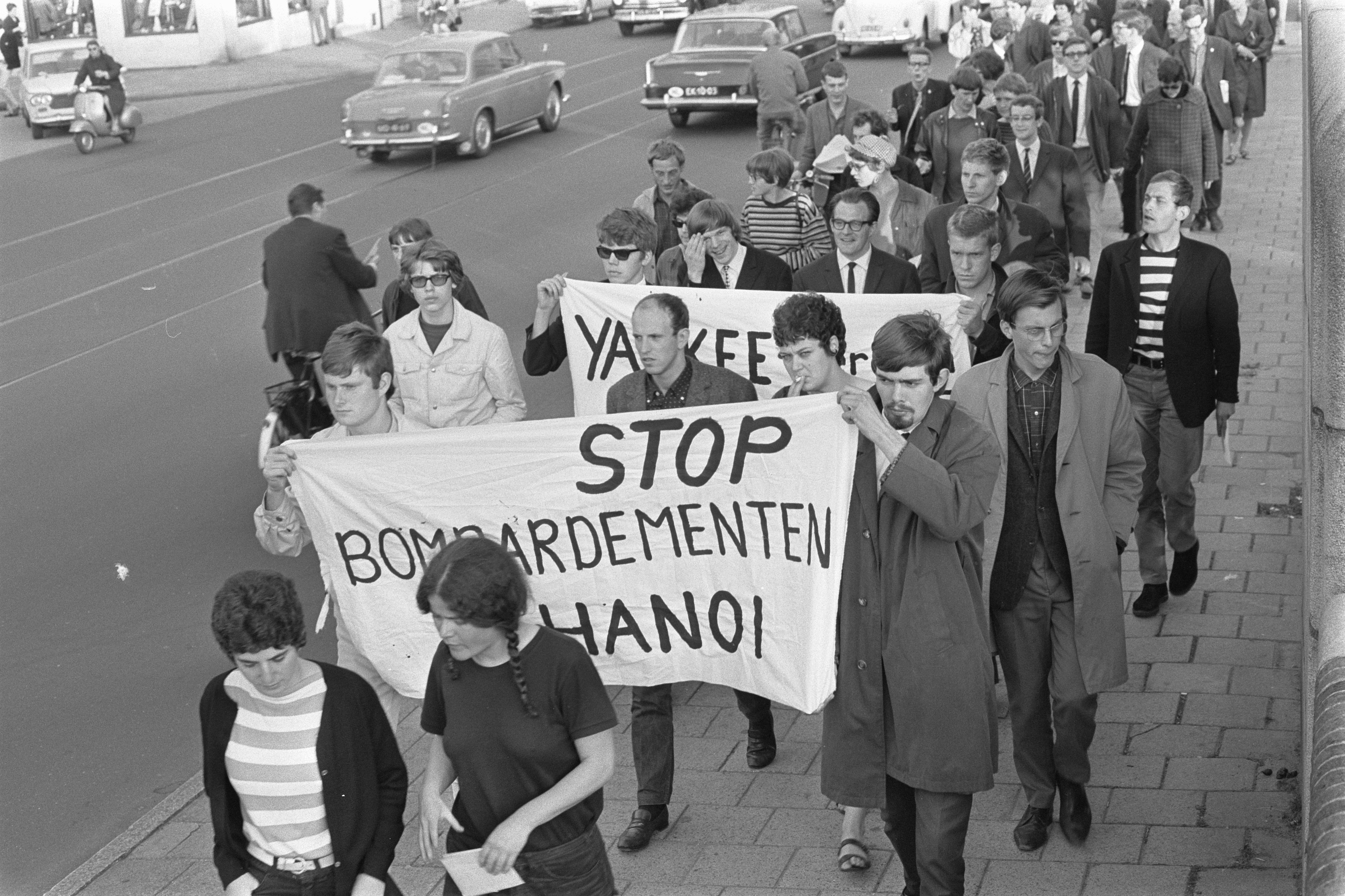
An anti–Vietnam War protest in Netherlands in July 1966

- February – a group of about 100 veterans attempted to return their military decorations to the White House in protest of the war, but were turned back.
- March 26 – anti-war demonstrations were held around the country and the world, with 20,000 taking part in New York City.
- April – Gallup poll shows that 59% believe that sending troops to Vietnam was not a mistake. Among the age group of 21–29, 71% believe it was not a mistake compared to 48% of those over 50.
- May 15 – another large demonstration, with 10,000 picketers calling for an end to the war, took place outside the White House and the Washington Monument.
- June – The Gallup poll respondents supporting the US handling of the war slipped to 41%, 37% expressed disapproval, and the rest had no opinion.
- July 3 – A crowd of 4,000 demonstrated against the US war in London and scuffled with police outside the US embassy. 33 protesters were arrested.
- Joan Baez and A. J. Muste organized over 3,000 people across the nation in an antiwar tax protest. Participants refused to pay their taxes or did not pay the amount designated for funding the war.
- Protests, strikes and sit-ins continued at Berkeley and across other campuses throughout the year. Three army privates, known as the "Fort Hood Three", refused to deploy in Vietnam, calling the war "illegal and immoral", and were sentenced to prison terms.
- Heavyweight boxing champion Muhammad Ali – formerly known as Cassius Clay – declared himself a conscientious objector and refused to go to war. According to a writer for Sports Illustrated, the governor of Illinois, Otto Kerner, Jr., called Ali "disgusting" and the governor of Maine, John H. Reed, said that Ali "should be held in utter contempt by every patriotic American." In 1967 Ali was sentenced to 5 years in prison for draft evasion, but his conviction was later overturned on appeal. In addition, he was stripped of his title and banned from professional boxing for more than three years.
- June 1966 – American students and others in England meeting at the London School of Economics formed the Stop It Committee. The group was prominent in every major London anti-war demonstration. It remained active until the end of the war in April 1975.

=== 1967 ===
Universal Newsreel about peace marches in April 1967

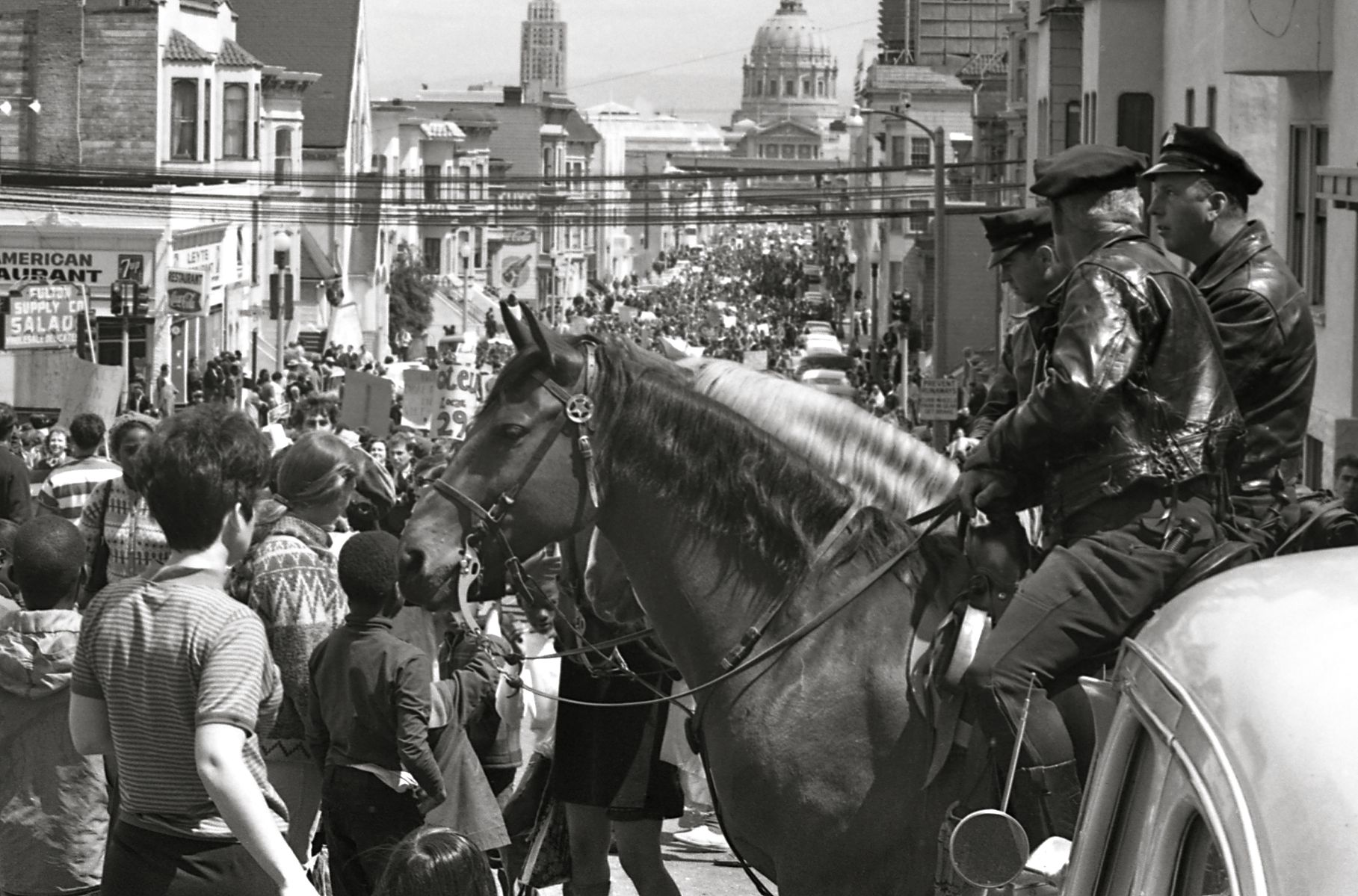
Mounted police at an anti–Vietnam War protest march in San Francisco on April 15, 1967, with San Francisco City Hall in the background

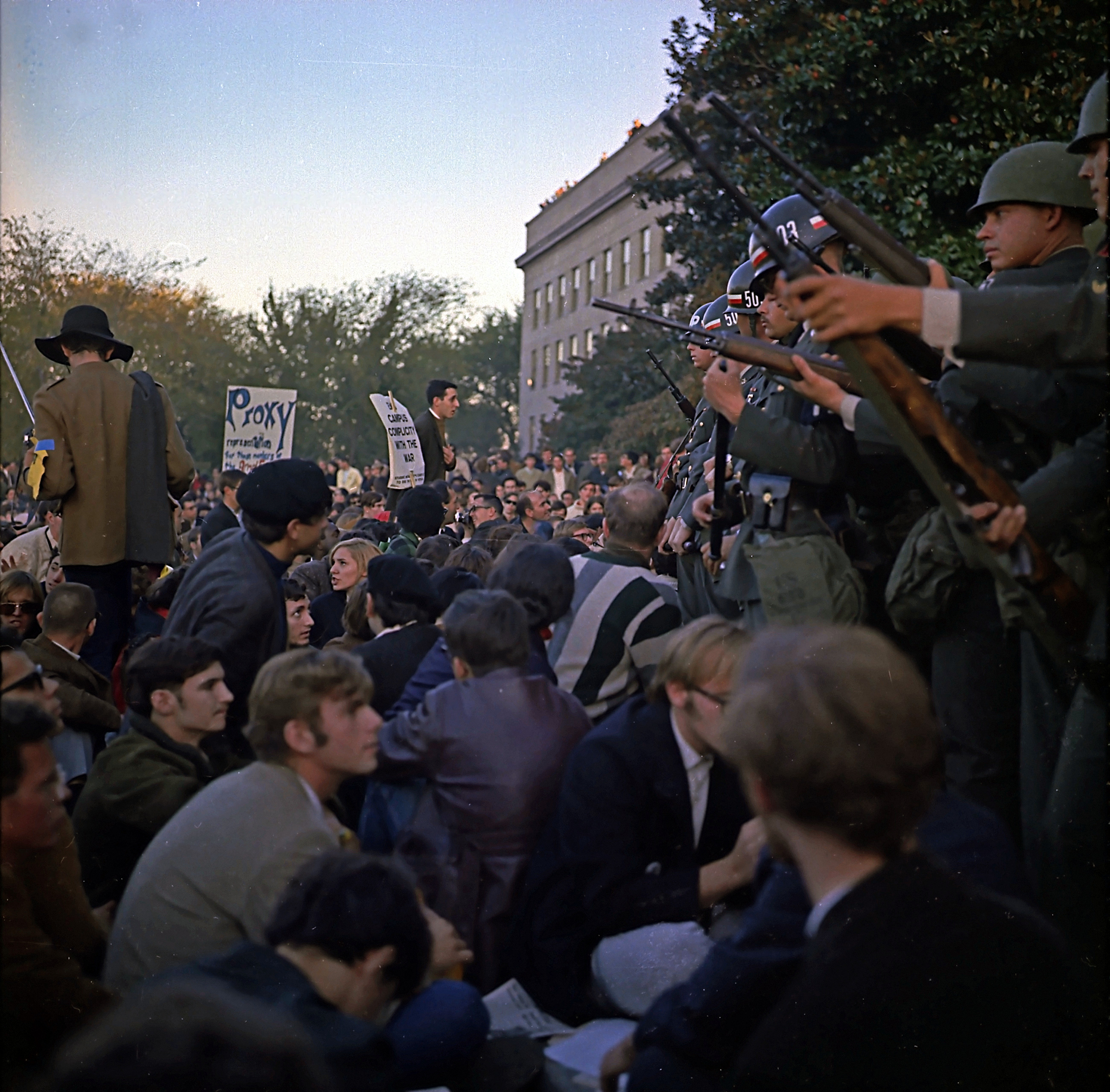
An anti–Vietnam var protest at the Pentagon in October 1967

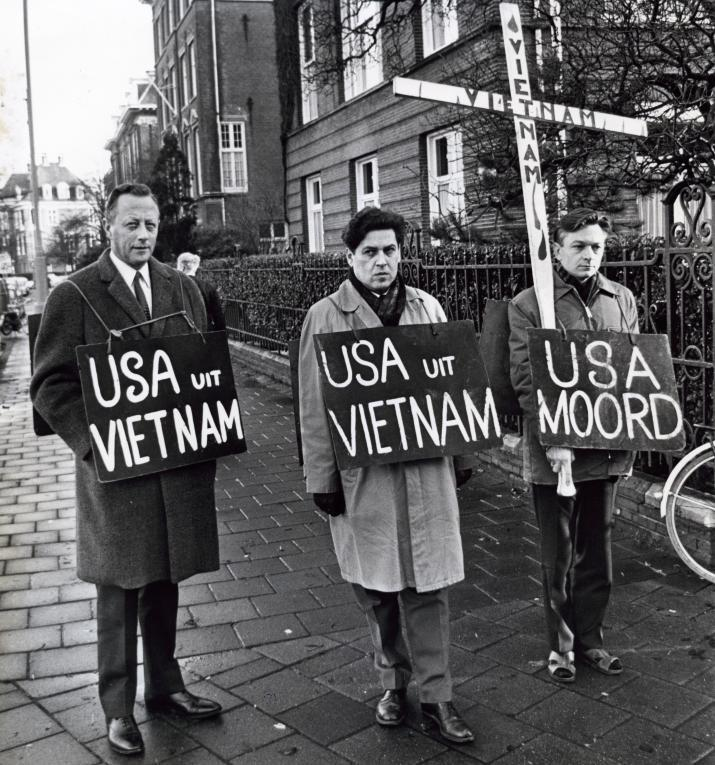
Placards reading "USA out of Vietnam" and "USA murder" during demonstrations in The Hague in the Netherlands by the PSP in 1967

The protest on June 23 in Los Angeles is singularly significant. It was one of the first massive war protests in the United States and the first in Los Angeles. Ending in a clash with riot police, it set a pattern for the massive protests which followed and due to the size and violence of this event, Johnson attempted no further public speeches in venues outside military bases.

- January 14 – 20,000–30,000 people staged a "Human Be-In" in Golden Gate Park in San Francisco, near the Haight-Ashbury neighborhood that had become the center of hippie activity.
- February 8 – Another Mother for Peace group founded.
- February – about 2,500 members of Women Strike for Peace (WSP) marched to the Pentagon. This was a peaceful protest that became rowdier when the demonstrators were denied a meeting with Secretary of Defense Robert McNamara.
- February 8 – Christian groups opposed to the war staged a nationwide "Fast for Peace."
- February 23 – The New York Review of Books published "The Responsibility of Intellectuals" by Noam Chomsky as a special supplement.
- March 12 – A three-page anti-war ad appeared in The New York Times bearing the signatures of 6,766 teachers and professors. The advertisement spanned two and a quarter pages in Section 4, The Week in Review. The advertisement itself cost around $16,500 and was sponsored by the Inter-University Committee for Debate on Foreign Policy.
- March 17 – a group of anti-war citizens marched to the Pentagon to protest American involvement in Vietnam.
- March 25 – Martin Luther King Jr., a leader of the civil rights movement, led a march of 5,000 against the war in Chicago.
- April 4 – Martin Luther King Jr. gave a speech in New York City. "America rejected Ho Chi Minh's revolutionary government seeking self-determination. ... " (See details here.)
- April 15 – 400,000 people organized by the Spring Mobilization Committee to End the War in Vietnam marched from Central Park to the UN building in New York City to protest the war, where they were addressed by critics of the war such as Benjamin Spock, Martin Luther King Jr., event initiator and director James Bevel, Harry Belafonte, and Jan Barry Crumb, a veteran of the war. On the same date 100,000, including Coretta Scott King, marched in San Francisco.
- April 24 – Abbie Hoffman led a small group of protesters against both the war and capitalism who interrupted the New York Stock Exchange, causing chaos by throwing fistfuls of both real and fake dollars down from the gallery.
- May 2 – British philosopher Bertrand Russell presided over the "Russell Tribunal" in Stockholm, a mock war crimes tribunal, which ruled that the US and its allies had committed war crimes in Vietnam. The proceedings were criticized as being a "show trial."
- May 22 – the fashionable À L'Innovation department store in Brussels, Belgium burnt down, killing over 300 people amid speculation that the fire was caused by Belgian Maoists against the Vietnam War.
- May 30 – Jan Crumb and ten like-minded men attended a peace demonstration in Washington, D.C.
- June 1 – Vietnam Veterans Against the War was born.
- Summer – Neil Armstrong and various other NASA officials began a tour of South America to raise awareness for space travel. According to First Man: The Life of Neil A. Armstrong, a 2005 biography, during the tour, several college students protested the astronaut, and shouted such phrases as "Murderers get out of Vietnam!" and other anti–Vietnam War messages.
- June 23 – President Johnson was met in Los Angeles by a massive anti-war protest on the street outside the hotel where he was speaking at a Democratic fundraiser.Progressive Labor Party and SDS protesters. The Riot Act was read and 51 protesters arrested. This was one of the first massive war protests in the United States and the first in Los Angeles, Ending in a clash with riot police, it set a pattern for the massive protests which followed. The vigor of the response from the LAPD, initially intended to prevent the demonstrators from storming the hotel where Johnson was speaking, was to a certain extent based on exaggerated reports from undercover agents which had infiltrated the organizations sponsoring the protest. "Unresistant demonstrators were beaten – some in front of literally thousands of witnesses – without even the pretext of and attempt to make an arrest." A crowd the Los Angeles Times reports at 10,000 clashed with 500 riot police outside President Johnson's fundraiser at the Century City Plaza Hotel. Expecting only 1,000 or 2,000 protesters, the LAPD field commander later told reporters he had been 'astounded' by the size of the demonstration. "Where did all those people come from? I asked myself." Scores were injured, including many peaceful middle-class protesters. Some sources put the crowd as high as 15,000 and noted that the police attacked the marchers with nightsticks to disperse the crowd. Due to the size and violence of this event, Johnson attempted no further public speeches in venues outside military bases.
- July 30 – Gallup poll reported 52% of Americans disapproved of Johnson's handling of the war, 41% thought the US made a mistake in sending troops, and over 56% thought the US was losing the war or at an impasse.
- August 28 – US Representative Tim Lee Carter (R-KY) stated before congress: "Let us now, while we are yet strong, bring our men home, every man jack of them. The Viet Cong fight fiercely and tenaciously because it is their land and we are foreigners intervening in their civil war. If we must fight, let us fight in defense of our homeland and our own hemisphere."
- September 20 – over one thousand members of WSP rallied at the White House. The police used brutal tactics to try to limit it to 100 people (as per the law) or stop the demonstration, and the event tarnished the wholesome and nonviolent reputation of the WSP.
- October – Stop the Draft Week resulted in major clashes at the Oakland, California military induction center, and saw more than a thousand registrants return their draft cards in events across the country. The cards were delivered to the Justice Department on October 20. Singer/musician-activist Joan Baez, a longtime critic of the war in Vietnam, was among those arrested in the Oakland demonstrations.
- October 18 – 300 students at the University of Wisconsin–Madison attempted to prevent Dow Chemical Company, the maker of napalm, from holding a job fair on campus. The police eventually forced the demonstration to end, but Dow was banned from the campus. Three police officers and 65 students were injured in the event, dubbed "Dow Day".
- October 21 – the March on the Pentagon took place. A large demonstration organized by the National Mobilization Committee to End the War in Vietnam, a crowd of nearly 100,000 met at the Lincoln Memorial in Washington, D.C., and at least 30,000 people then marched to the Pentagon for another rally and an all-night vigil. Some, including Abbie Hoffman, Jerry Rubin, and Allen Ginsberg, attempted to "exorcise" and "levitate" the building, while others engaged in civil disobedience on the steps of the Pentagon. These actions were interrupted by clashes with soldiers and police. In all, 647 arrests were made. When a plot to airdrop 10,000 flowers on the Pentagon was foiled by undercover agents, some of these flowers ended up being placed in the barrels of MP's rifles, as seen in famous photographs of the event (such as Flower Power and The Ultimate Confrontation: The Flower and the Bayonet). Norman Mailer documented the events surrounding the march, and the march on the Pentagon itself, in his non-fiction novel, The Armies of the Night.
- November 1967 – a non-binding referendum was voted on in San Francisco, California which posed the question of whether there should be an immediate withdrawal of American troops from Vietnam. The vote was 67% against the referendum, which was taken by a Johnson administration official as support for the war.

=== 1968 ===
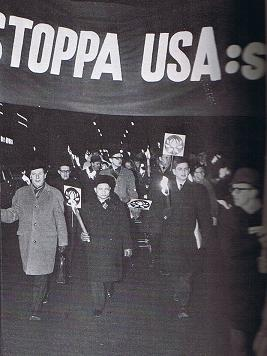
Olof Palme marching against the Vietnam War 1968 in Stockholm

- January 15 – over five thousand women rallied in D.C. in the Jeannette Rankin Brigade protest. This was the first all-female anti-war protest intended to get Congress to withdrawal troops from Vietnam.
- January 18 – while in the White House for a conference about juvenile delinquency, black singer and entertainer Eartha Kitt yelled at Lady Bird Johnson about the generation of young men dying in the war.
- January 30– Tet Offensive was launched and resulted in much higher casualties and changed perceptions. The optimistic assessments made prior to the offensive by the administration and the Pentagon came under heavy criticism and ridicule as the "credibility gap" that had opened in 1967 widened into a chasm.
- February – Gallup poll showed 35% approved of Johnson's handling of the war; 50% disapproved; the rest, no opinion. [NYT, 2/14/68] In another poll that month, 23% of Americans defined themselves as "doves" and 61% "hawks."
- March 12 – anti-war candidate Eugene McCarthy received more votes than expected in the New Hampshire primary, leading to more expressions of opposition against the war. McCarthy urged his supporters to exchange the 'unkempt look' rapidly becoming fashionable among war opponents for a more clean-cut style to in order not to scare voters. These were known as "Clean Genes."
- March 16 – Robert F. Kennedy joined the race for the US presidency as an anti-war candidate. He was shot and killed on June 5, the morning after he won a decisive victory over McCarthy in the Democratic primary in California.
- March 17 – Major rally outside the US Embassy in London's Grosvenor Square turned to a riot with 86 people injured and over 200 arrested. Over 10,000 had rallied peacefully in Trafalgar Square but met a police barricade outside the embassy. A UK Foreign Office report claimed that the rioting had been organized by 100 members of the West German SDS who were "acknowledged experts in methods of riot against the police."
- March – Gallup poll reported that 49% of respondents felt involvement in the war was an error.
- April 17 – National media films the anti-war riot that breaks out at Columbia University. The over-reaction by the police at Columbia is shown in Berlin and Paris, sparking reactions in those cities.
- April 26 – a million college and high school students boycotted class to show opposition to the war.
- April 27 – an anti-war march in Chicago organized by Rennie Davis and others ended with police beating many of the marchers, a precursor to the police riots later that year at the Democratic Convention.
- May 17 – the Catonsville Nine activists burned draft files in Maryland.
- July – singer and activist Phil Ochs released "The War Is Over", a song which has been described as "one of the most potent antiwar songs of the 1960s" and Ochs' "greatest act of bravery as a topical songwriter".
- August 26–29 – the 1968 Democratic National Convention was held in Chicago, anti-war protesters marched and demonstrated throughout the city. Chicago mayor Richard J. Daley brought to bear 23,000 police and National Guardsman upon 10,000 protesters. Tensions between police and protesters quickly escalated, resulting in a "police riot" and the chant by protesters "The whole world is watching". Eight leading anti-war activists were indicted by the US Attorney and prosecuted in 1969 for conspiracy to riot; the 1970 convictions of the Chicago Seven were subsequently overturned on appeal.
- August – Gallup poll shows 53% said it was a mistake to send troops to Vietnam.
- 1968 – Among the academic or scholarly groups was the Committee of Concerned Asian Scholars, founded in 1968 by graduate students and junior faculty in Asian studies.

=== 1969 ===
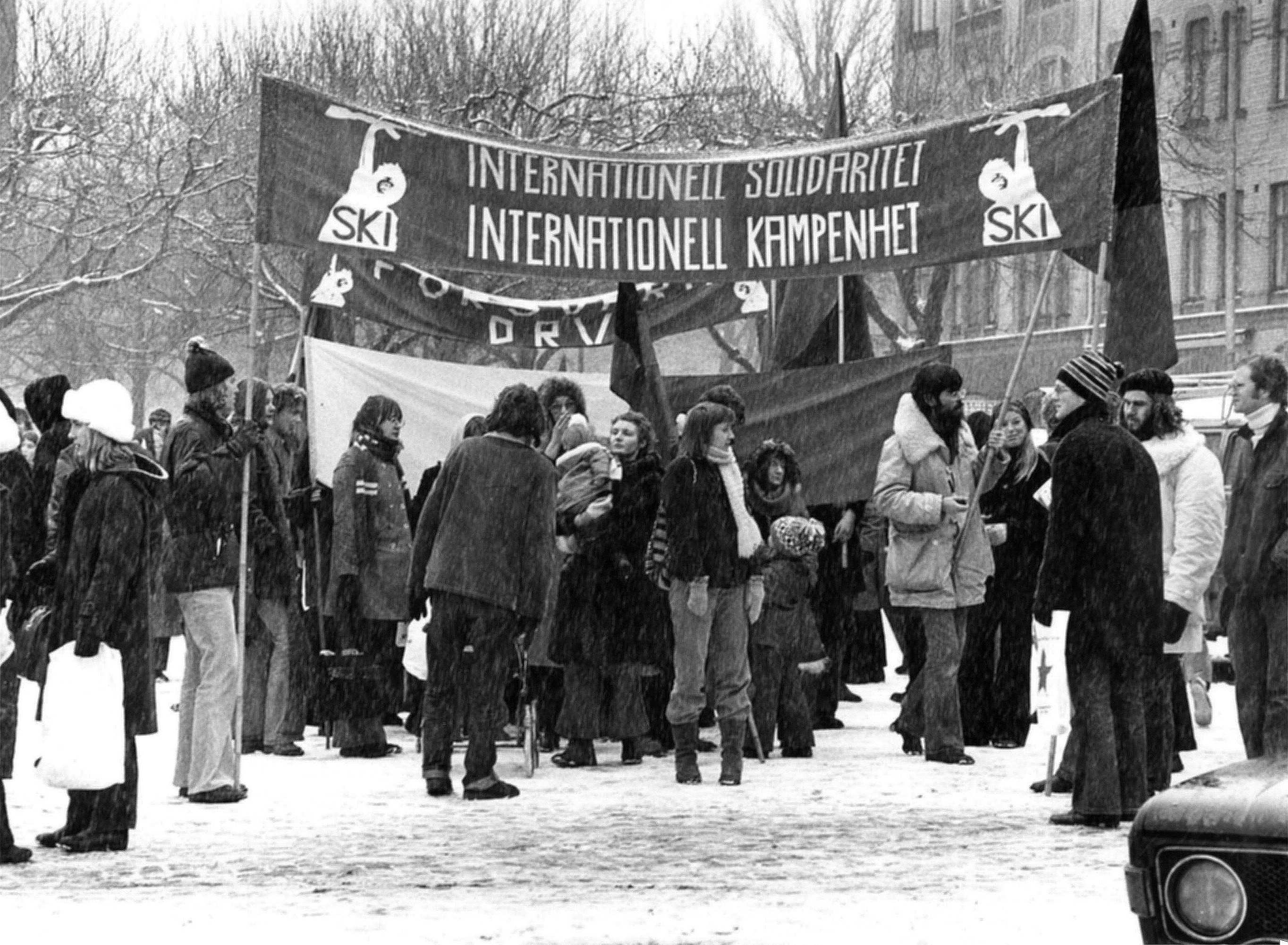
Anti–Vietnam War demonstrations in Lund, Sweden, in the late 1960s and early 1970s

- March – polls indicated that 19% of Americans wanted the war to end as soon as possible, 26% wanted South Vietnam to take over responsibility for the war from the US, 19% favored the current policy, and 33% wanted total military victory.
- March – students at SUNY Buffalo destroyed a Themis construction site.
- March 5 – Senator J. William Fulbright was prevented from speaking at the first National Convocation on the Challenge of Building Peace by members of the Veterans and Reservists to End the War in Vietnam.
- April 6 – a spontaneous anti-war rally in Central Park was recorded and later released as Environments 3.
- May 22 – the Canadian government announced that immigration officials would not and could not ask about immigration applicants' military status if they showed up at the border seeking permanent residence in Canada.
- July 16 – activist David Harris was arrested for refusing the draft and would ultimately serve a fifteen-month prison sentence; Harris' wife, prominent musician, pacifist and activist Joan Baez, toured and performed on behalf of her husband, throughout the remainder of 1969, attempting to raise consciousness around the issue of ending the draft.
- July 31 – The New York Times published the results of a Gallup poll showing that 53% of the respondents approved of Nixon's handling of the war, 30% disapproved, and the balance had no opinion.
- August 15–18 – the Woodstock Festival was held at Max Yasgur's farm in Bethel, New York. Peace was a primary theme in this pivotal popular music event.
- October 15 – the Moratorium to End the War in Vietnam demonstrations took place. Millions of Americans took the day off from work and school to participate in local demonstrations against the war. These were the first major demonstrations against the Nixon administration's handling of the war.
- October – 58% of Gallup respondents said US entry into the war was a mistake.
- November – Sam Melville, Jane Alpert, and several others bombed several corporate offices and military installations (including the Whitehall Army Induction Center) in and around New York City.
- November 15 – crowds of up to half a million people participated in an anti-war demonstration in Washington, D.C., and a similar demonstration was held in San Francisco. These protests were organized by the New Mobilization Committee to End the War in Vietnam (New Mobe) and the Student Mobilization Committee to End the War in Vietnam (SMC).
- December 7 – the 5th Dimension performed their song "Declaration" on the Ed Sullivan Show. Consisting of the opening of the Declaration of Independence (through "for their future security"), it suggests that the right and duty of revolting against a tyrannical government is still relevant.
- Late December – the And babies poster is published – "easily the most successful poster to vent the outrage that so many felt about the war in Southeast Asia."
- By end of the year – 69% of students identified themselves as doves.

=== 1970 ===
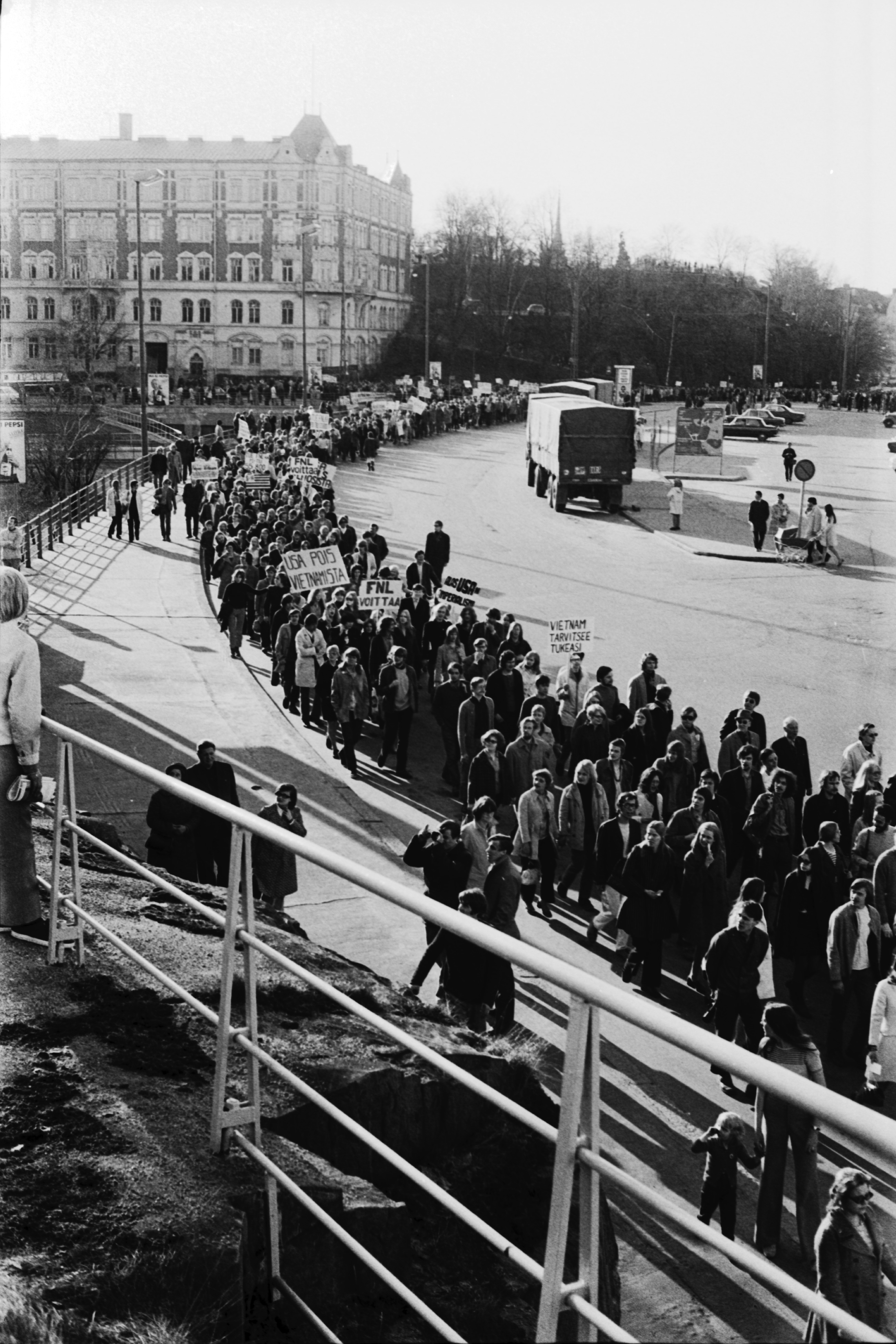
An anti–Vietnam War protest in Helsinki, Finland, in 1970

- March 4 – Antonia Martínez, a 21-year-old student at the University of Puerto Rico at Río Piedras was shot and killed by a policeman while watching and commenting on the anti–Vietnam War and education reform student protests at the University of Puerto Rico.
- March 14 – two merchant seamen, claiming allegiance to the SDS, hijacked the Columbia Eagle, a US-flagged merchant vessel under contract with the US government carrying 10,000 tons of napalm bombs for use by the US Air Force in the Vietnam War. The SS Columbia Eagle incident resulted in the hijackers forcing its master to divert to then-neutral Cambodia (which promptly was taken over by anti-Communists, who returned to the ship to the US weeks later).
- April 24 – Taiwanese activist Peter Huang attempted to assassinate Taiwan Vice Premier Chiang Ching-kuo in New York City. Huang viewed his actions as part of an anti-imperialist opposition to the war in Vietnam, as he deemed the Taiwan government as an "accomplice of Washington."
- Kent State/Cambodia Invasion Protest, Washington, D.C.: After the Kent State shootings, on May 4, 100,000 anti-war demonstrators converged on Washington, D.C., to protest the shooting of the students in Ohio and the Nixon administration's incursion into Cambodia. Even though the demonstration was quickly put together, protesters were still able to bring out thousands to march in the Capital. It was an almost spontaneous response to the events of the previous week. Police ringed the White House with buses to block the demonstrators from getting too close to the executive mansion. Early in the morning before the march, Nixon met with protesters at the Lincoln Memorial but nothing was resolved, and the protest went on as planned.
- May 1–8 – National Student Strike: more than 450 university, college and high school campuses across the country were shut by student strikes and both violent and non-violent protests that involved more than 4 million students, in the only nationwide student strike in US history.
- May – A Gallup poll shows that 56% of the public believed that sending troops to Vietnam was a mistake, 61% of those over 50 expressed that belief compared to 49% of those between the ages of 21–29.
- June 13 – President Nixon established the President's Commission on Campus Unrest. The commission was directed to study the dissent, disorder, and violence breaking out on college and university campuses.
- July 1970 – the award-winning documentary The World of Charlie Company was broadcast. "It showed GIs close to mutiny, balking at orders that seemed to them unreasonable. This was something never seen on television before." The documentary was produced by CBS News.
- August 24 – near 3:40 a.m., a van filled with ammonium nitrate and fuel oil mixture was detonated on the University of Wisconsin-Madison in the Sterling Hall bombing. One researcher was killed, and three others were injured.
- August 28 – September 3 – Vortex I: A Biodegradable Festival of Life: To avert potential violence arising from planned anti-war protests, a government-sponsored rock festival was held near Portland, Oregon from August 28 to September 3, attracting 100,000 participants. The festival, arranged by the People's Army Jamboree (an ad hoc group) and Oregon governor Tom McCall, was set up when the FBI told the governor that President Nixon's planned appearance at an American Legion convention in Portland could lead to violence worse than that seen at the 1968 Democratic National Convention in Chicago.
- August 29 – Chicano Moratorium: some 25,000 Mexican-Americans participated in the largest anti-war demonstration in Los Angeles. Police attacked the crowd with billy clubs and tear gas; two people were killed. Immediately after the marchers were dispersed, sheriff's deputies raided a nearby bar, where they shot and killed Rubén Salazar, KMEX news director and Los Angeles Times columnist, with a tear-gas projectile.

=== 1971 ===
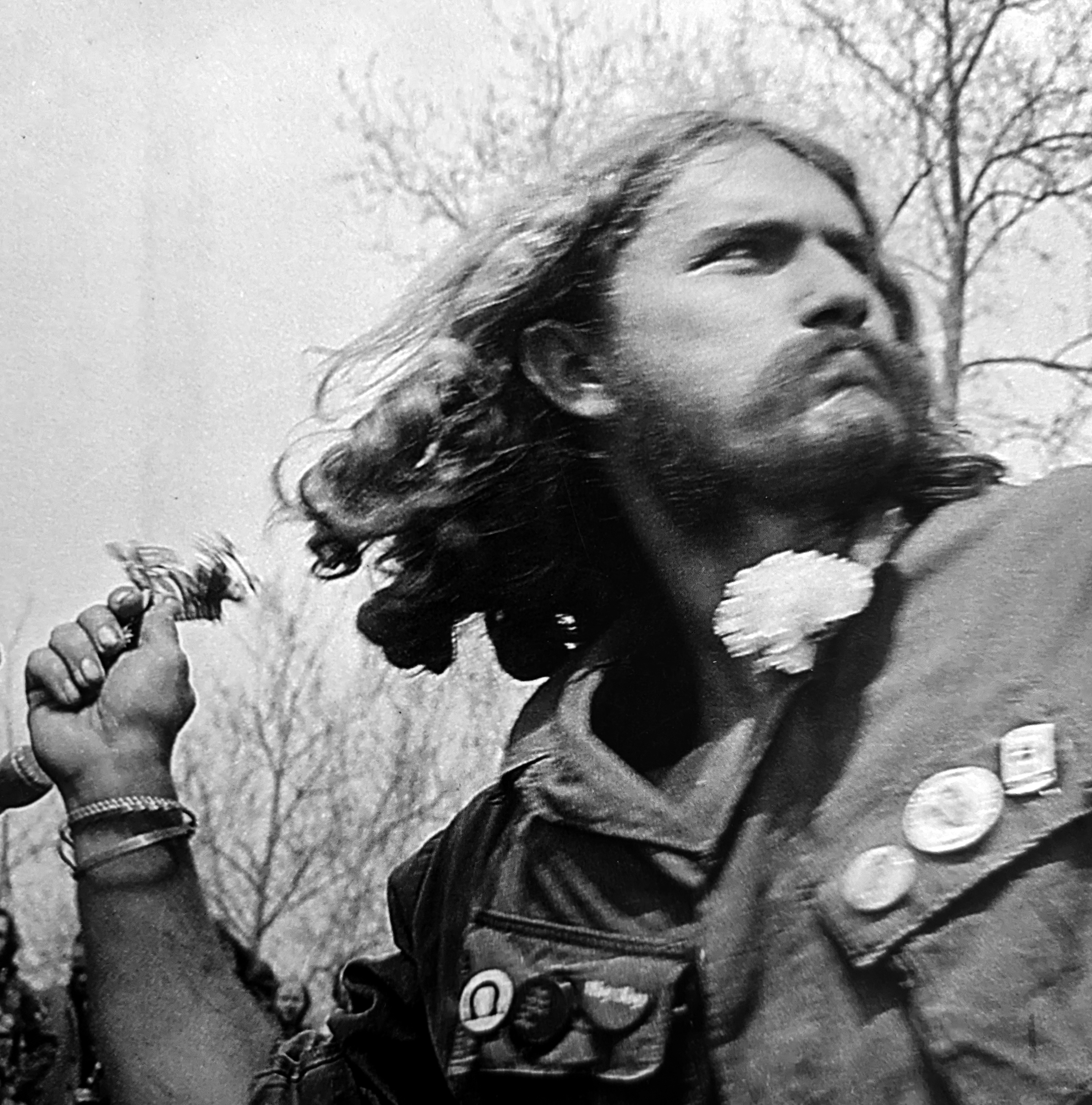
A Vietnam War veteran throwing his medal at the US Capitol

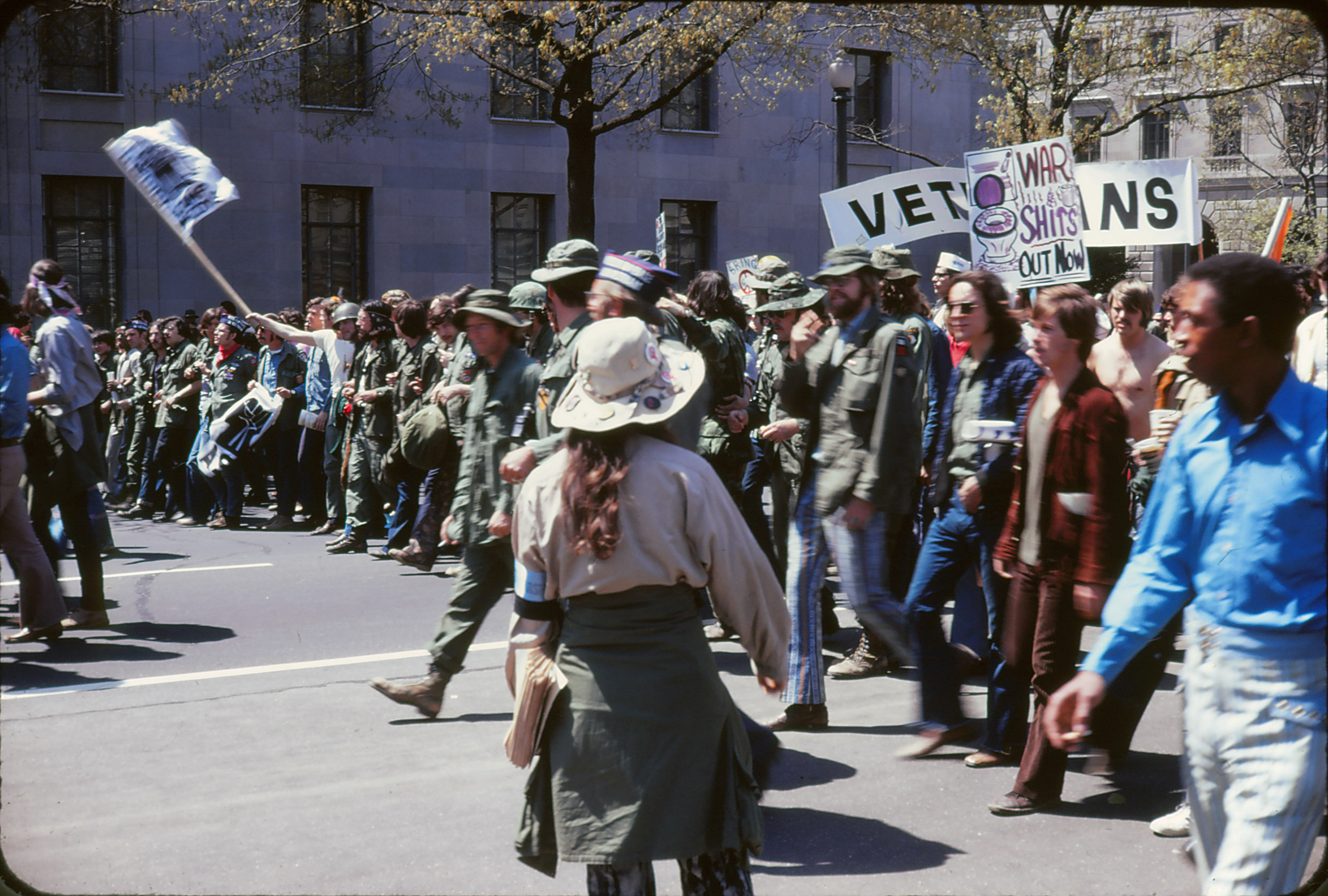
An anti–Vietnam War protest in Washington, D.C., on April 24, 1971

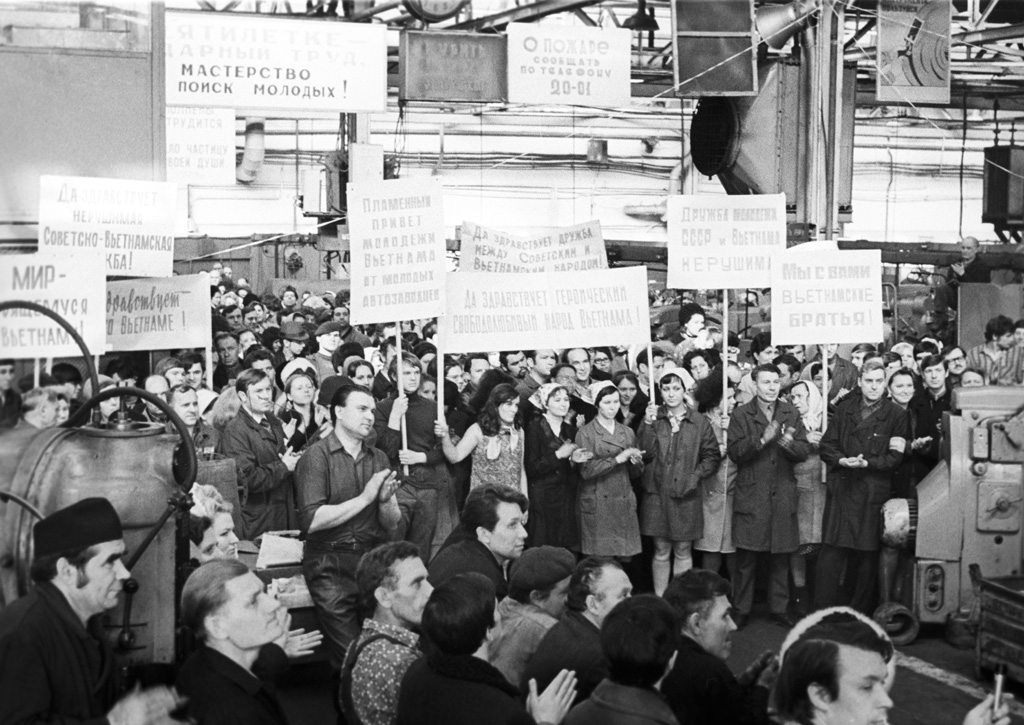
A rally in support of the Vietnamese people at the Moskvitch factory in 1973

- April 23 – Vietnam veterans threw away over 700 medals on the West Steps of the Capitol building. The next day, anti-war organizers claimed that 500,000 people had marched, making this the largest demonstration since the November 1969 march.
- May 5 – 1,146 people were arrested on the Capitol grounds trying to shut down Congress. This brought the total arrested during the 1971 May Day Protests to over 12,000. Abbie Hoffman was arrested on charges of interstate travel to incite a riot and assaulting a police officer.
- August 1971 – the Camden 28 conducted a raid on the Camden, New Jersey draft board offices. The 28 included five or more members of the clergy, as well as a number of local blue-collar workers.
- December 26 – 15 anti-war veterans began to occupy the Statue of Liberty, flying a US flag upside down from her crown. They left on December 28, following issuance of a Federal Court order. Also on December 28, 80 young veterans clashed with police and were arrested while trying to occupy the Lincoln Memorial in Washington, D.C.

=== 1972 ===
- March 29 – 166 people, many of them seminarians, were arrested in Harrisburg, Pennsylvania, for encircling the Federal Courthouse with a chain, to protest the trial of the Harrisburg Seven.
- April 19 – in response to renewed escalation of bombing, students at many colleges and universities around the country broke into campus buildings and threatened strikes. The following weekend, protests were held in Los Angeles, New York City, San Francisco, and elsewhere.
- May 13 – protests again spread across the country in response to President Nixon's decision to mine harbors in North Vietnam and renewed bombing of North Vietnam.
- July 6 – four Sisters of Notre Dame de Namur on a White House Tour stopped and began praying to protest the war. In the next six weeks, such kneel-ins became a popular form of protest and led to over 158 protesters' arrests.

== Organizations ==
- Americans for Democratic Action
- American Writers Against the Vietnam War
- Asian American Political Alliance (AAPA)
- Asian Americans for Action (AAA)
- Bay Area Asian Coalition Against the War (BAACAW)
- Black Women Enraged – a Harlem anti-war movement.
- Clergy and Laymen Concerned about Vietnam (CALCAV)
- Committee for a Sane Nuclear Policy (SANE) – liberal international organization that was founded in 1957 by a group of nuclear pacifists. They attempted to increase public opinion in favor of their cause in an attempt to influence policy makers to halt atmospheric nuclear testing and reversing the arms race and the Cold War.
- Committee for NonViolent Action (CNVA) – radical pacifist organization that "blended philosophical anarchism with Gandhian pacifism." The organization used civil disobedience in direct action against military action.
- Concerned Americans Abroad, London-based group established by Heinz Norden
- Concerned Officers Movement – an organization of officers formed within the US military.
- FTA – a group whose initials either stand for Free the Army or Fuck the Army, depending on the situation, was led by Jane Fonda and Donald Sutherland.
- Furman University Corps of Kazoos (FUCK) – created to make fun of the military and campus ROTC program at Furman University in South Carolina. Such anti-campus ROTC groups were common throughout the US
- GI Coffeehouses – coffeehouses created by anti-war activists as a method of supporting antiwar and anti-military sentiment among GIs.
- GI's Against Fascism – an organization of anti-war and anti-military GIs formed within the US Navy in San Diego, CA.
- The League of Women Voters – founded in 1920, was one of the first groups to call for an end to military involvement in Vietnam.
- Movement for a Democratic Military – an anti-war and GI rights organization during the Vietnam War.
- National Black Anti-War Anti-Draft Union (NBAWADU) – led by Gwen Patton and formed from black members of SNCC and socialist parties.
- National Black Draft Counselors (NBDC) – led by and created to help young black men avoid being drafted.
- National Mobilization to End the War in Vietnam
- Sisters of Notre Dame de Namur – popularized the use of kneel-ins and prayer to end the war and stop its escalation.
- Student Nonviolent Coordinating Committee – SNCC.
- The Student Libertarian Movement – Libertarian organization that was formed in 1972. The guiding principles of this organization were opposition to the war in Vietnam and opposition to the draft. The organization did not take a strong stand on racial issues. For example, "In virtually hundreds of issues of libertarian newspapers, bulletins, and journals, the civil rights movement, Black nationalism, or race in general composed no more than 1 percent of all articles surveyed."
- Student Peace Union.
- Students for Democratic Society (SDS) – founded in 1960 and was seen as one of the most active college campus groups of the New Left and the antiwar movement.
- Third World Liberation Front (TWLF) – Some Asian American student organizations under this were: Filipino American Collegiate (PACE), Asian American Political Alliance (AAPA), and Chinese for Social Action (ICSA)
- Vietnam Veterans Against the War
- Weather Underground
- WIN (Workshop in Nonviolence) Magazine editors and staff included Maris Cakars, Marty Jezer, Paul Johnson, Susan Kent Cakars and Tad Richards. Published authors such as Grace Paley, Barbara Deming, Andrea Dworkin and Abbie Hoffman.
- Women's International League for Peace and Freedom (WILPF) – founded in 1919 after World War I and provided women with an early entry into the antiwar movement.

† Traditional peace groups like Fellowship of Reconciliation, American Friends Service Committee, the Bruderhof, War Resisters League, and the Catholic Workers Movement, became involved in the antiwar movement as well.

† Various committees and campaigns for peace in Vietnam came about, including Campaign for Disarmament, Campaign to End the Air War, Campaign to Stop Funding the War, Campaign to Stop the Air War, Catholic Peace Fellowship, and Central Committee for Conscientious Objectors.

== Slogans and chants ==
- "আমার নাম তোমার নাম ভিয়েতনাম}" (Amar nam tomar nam Bhiẏetnam; lit. 'Your name, my name—Vietnam'): Slogan chanted by leftists of Calcutta, including future President of India Pranab Mukherjee
- "Bring the troops home now!" was heard in mass marches in Washington, D.C., Seattle, San Francisco, Berkeley, New York, and San Diego.
- "Dow shall not kill" and "Making money burning babies!" were two slogans used by students at UCLA and other colleges to protest the Dow Chemical Company, the maker of napalm and Agent Orange. It also refers to "Thou shalt not kill," the fifth of the Ten Commandments
- "End the nuclear race, not the human race" was first used by the WSP in antinuclear demonstrations and became incorporated into the antiwar events.
- "Fuck, fuck, fuck it all. We don't want this anymore" was also chanted in marches from Brisbane to Boston.
- "Girls say yes to men who say no" was an anti-draft slogan used by the SDS and other organizations.
- "Hanoi, Paris, Saigon, socialistes !" was chanted in marches in Paris.
- "Hell, no, we won't go!" was heard in anti-draft and antiwar protests throughout the country.
- "Hey, hey, LBJ! How many kids did you kill today?" was especially chanted by students and other marchers and demonstrators in opposition to Lyndon B. Johnson.
- "Ho, Ho, Ho Chi Minh, the Vietnam Cong are gonna win" was a common anti-war chant during anti-war marches and rallies in the later sixties.
- "Not my son, not your son, not their sons" was an antiwar and anti-draft slogan used by the WSP during protests.
- "One, two, three, four, we don't want your fucking war" was chanted in marches from Brisbane to Boston.
- "Paix au Vietnam" ('Peace in Vietnam') was a slogan used by French students during protests.
- "Stop the war, feed the poor" was a popular slogan used by socially conscious and minority antiwar groups, protesting that the war diverted funds that struggling Americans desperately needed.
- "US assassins" was a slogan used by French students during protests.
- "War is not healthy for children and other living things" was a slogan of Another Mother for Peace, and was popular on posters.

== Gallery ==
=== Propaganda ===
Leaflet targeting Veterans and GIs

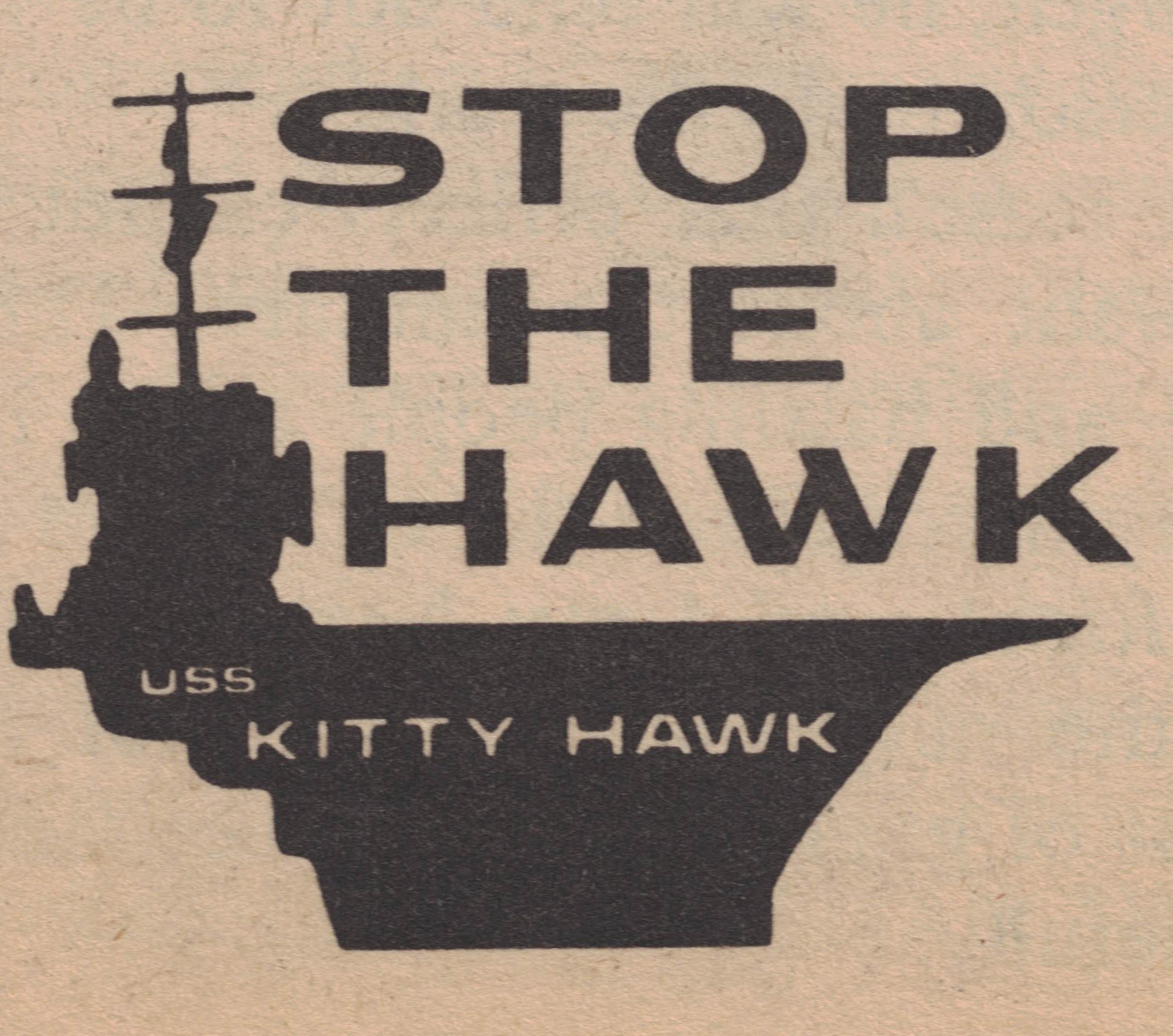
Stop the Hawk protest sticker

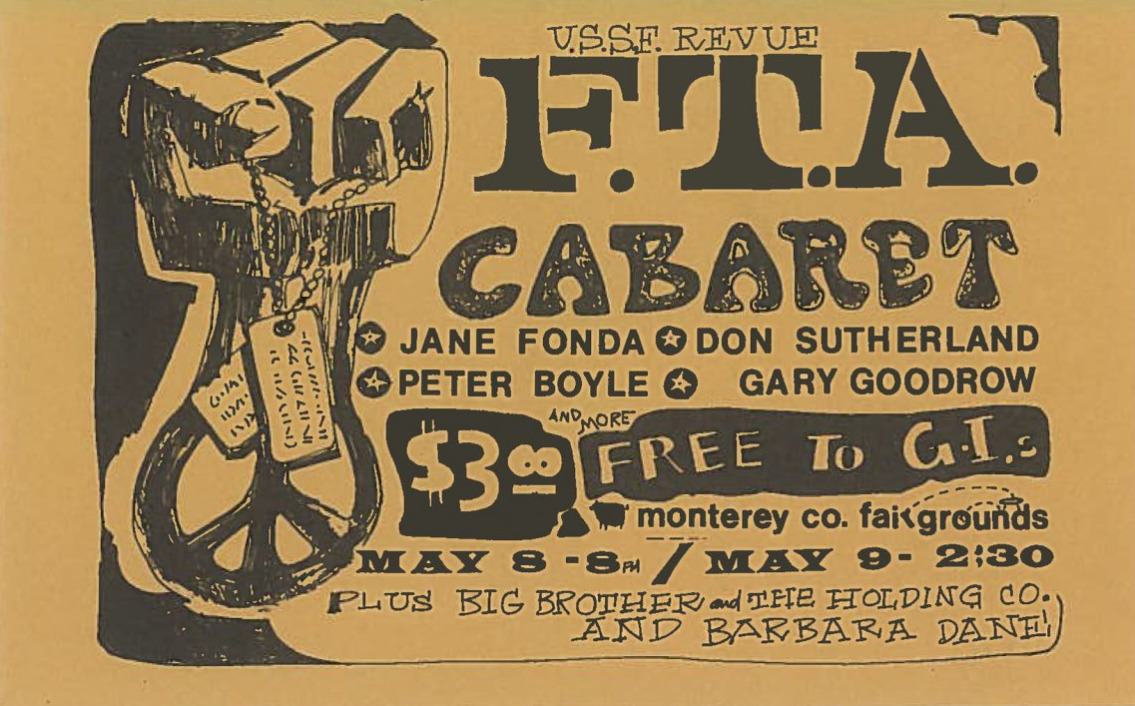
Ad for an FTA Show

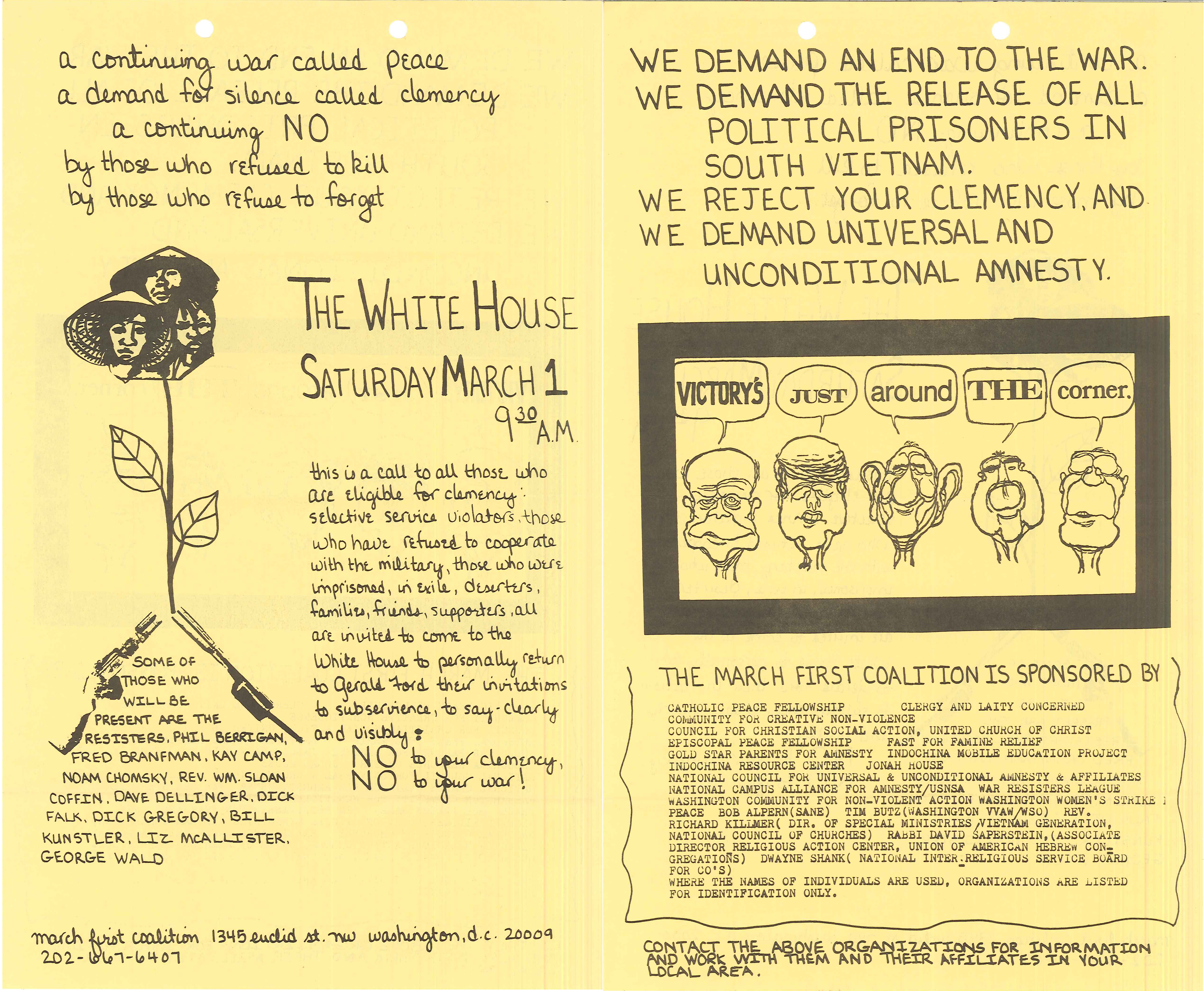
1975 flyer for a protest march

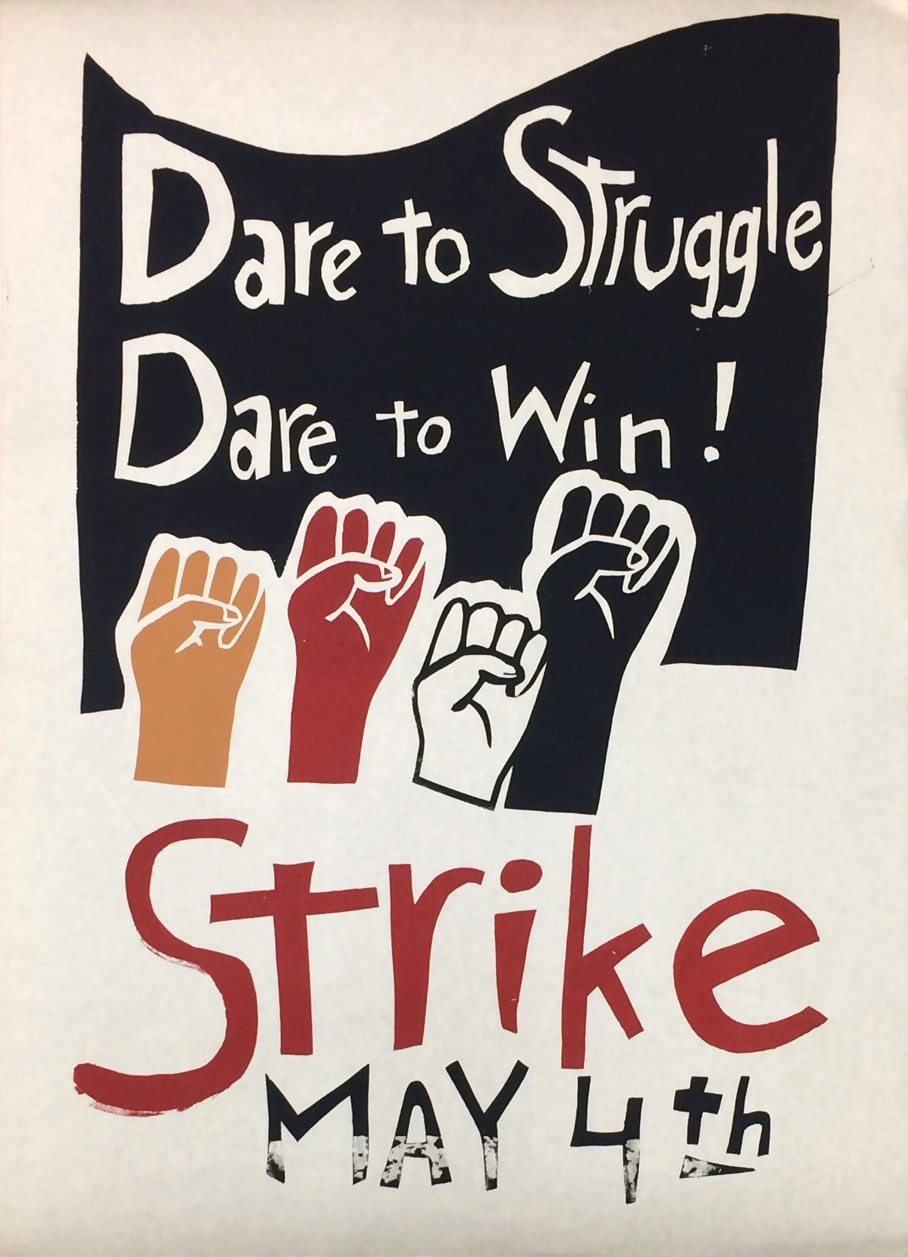
Poster advertising the student strike of 1970.

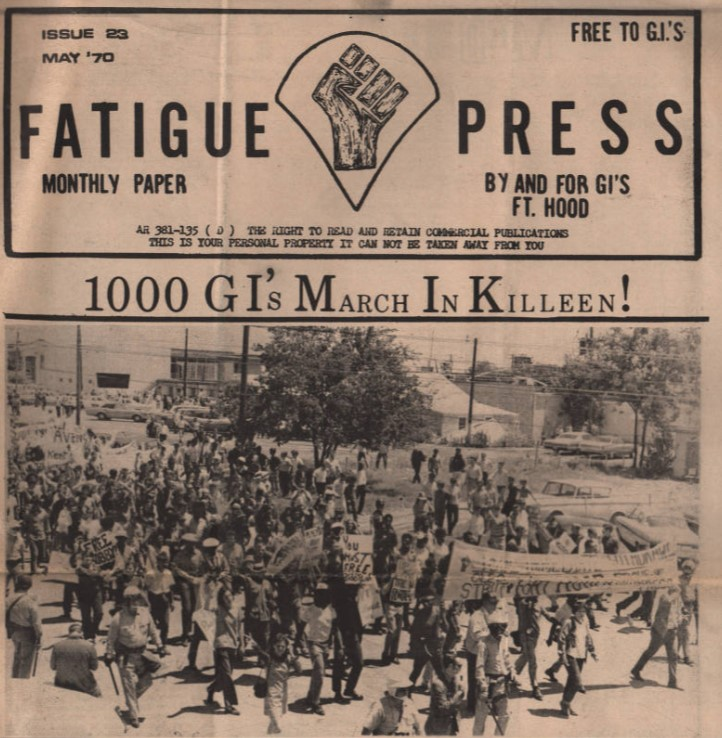
Fatigue Press GI Underground Newspaper May 1970 – 1000 GIs march against the war.

=== Protests ===
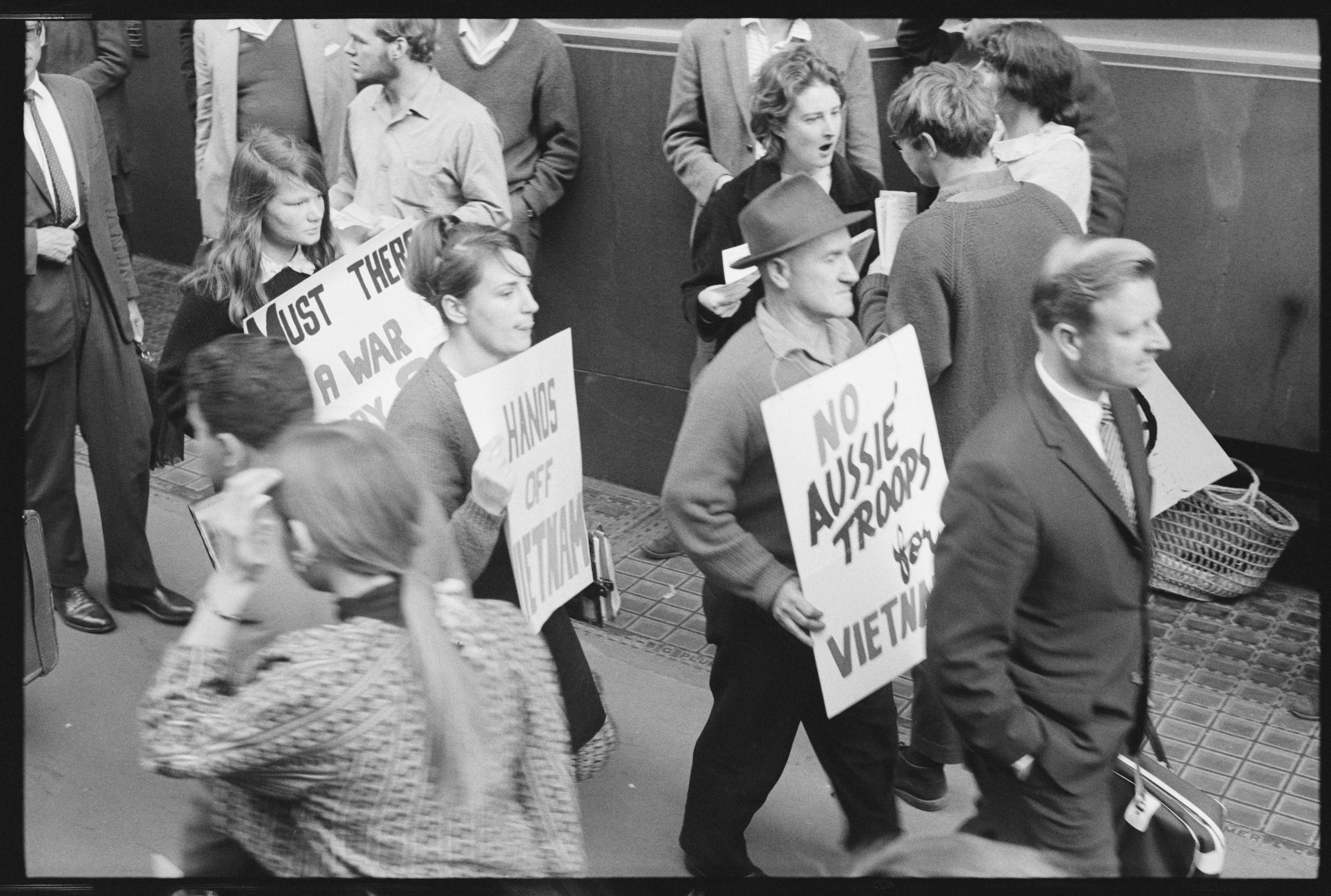
1965 protest in Sydney, Australia

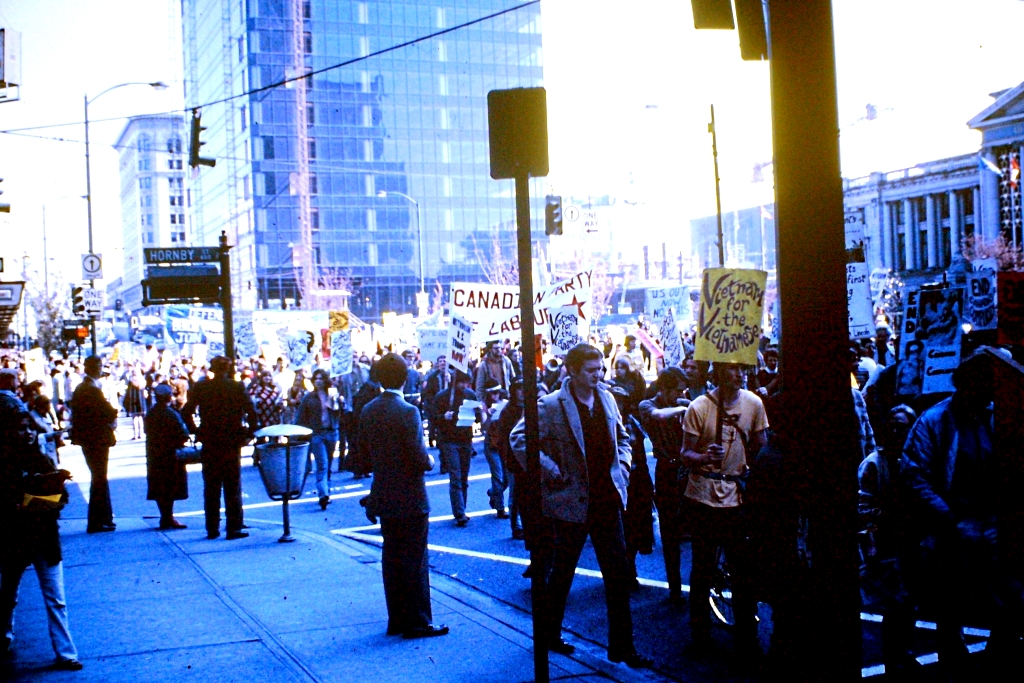
Anti–Vietnam War protest. Vancouver, British Columbia, Canada. 1968.

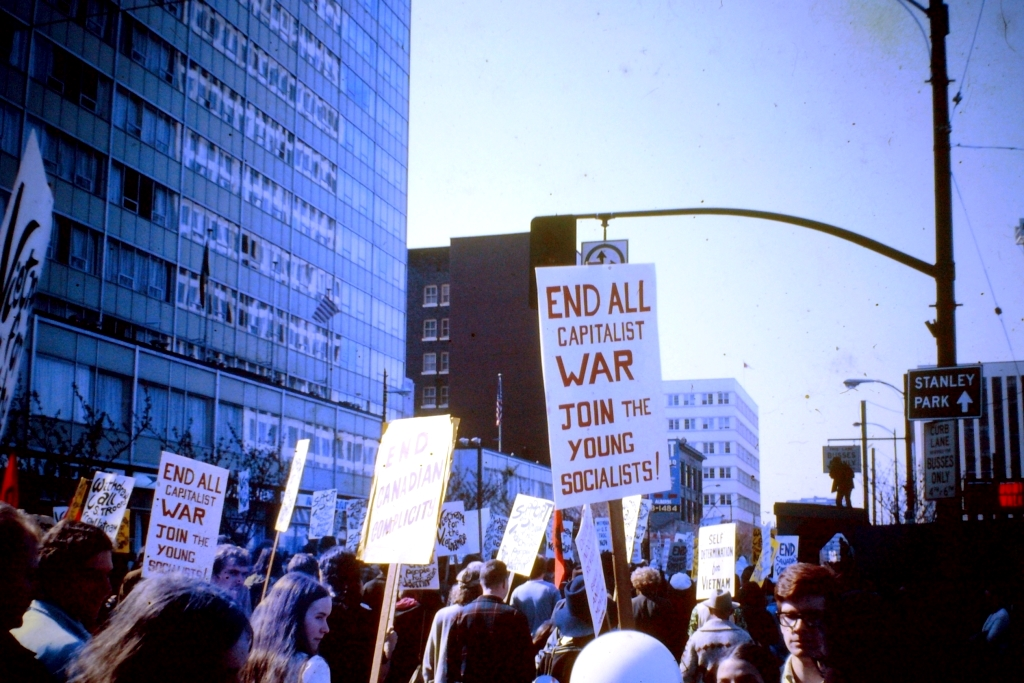
Anti–Vietnam War protest. Vancouver, B.C., Canada. 1968.

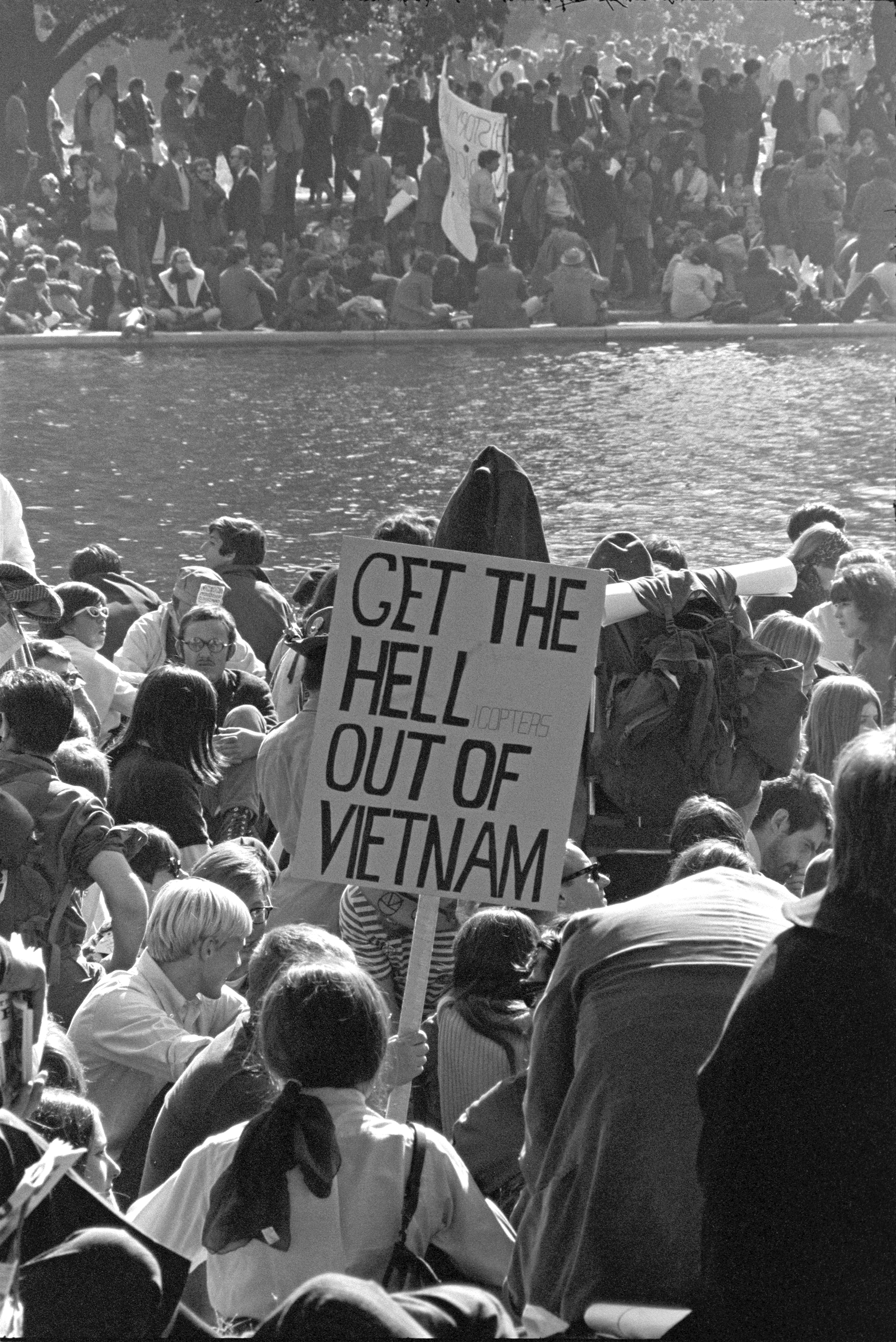
National Mobilization Committee to End the War in Vietnam's March on the Pentagon, October 21, 1967

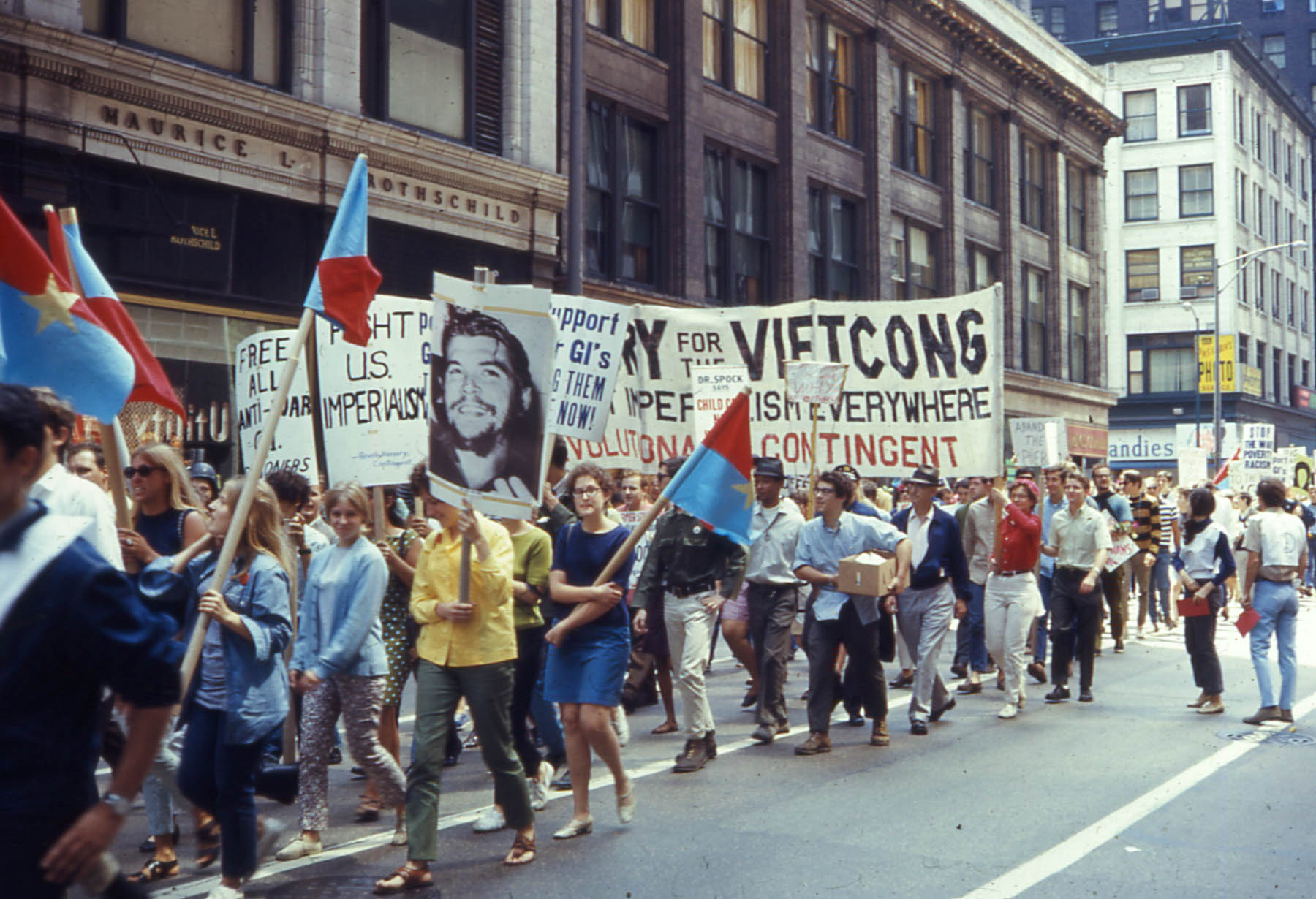
1968 protests in Chicago

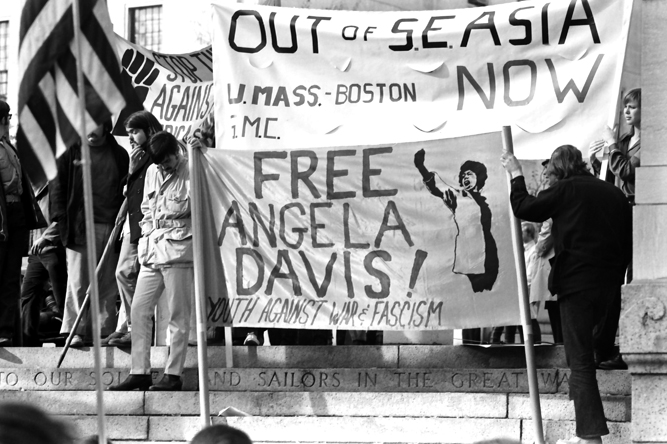
1970 protest in Boston

== See also ==
- Bed-in
- Canada and the Vietnam War
- Civil disobedience
- Concerned Officers Movement
- Congressional opponents of the Vietnam War
- Court-martial of Howard Levy
- Donald W. Duncan
- Fort Hood Three
- GI's Against Fascism
- GI Coffeehouses
- GI Underground Press
- List of protests in the United States § War
- Legality of the Vietnam War
- List of peace activists
- List of anti-war organizations
- Lists of protests against the Vietnam War
- List of protest marches on Washington, D.C.
- May Day Protests 1971
- Movement for a Democratic Military
- Myth of the spat-on Vietnam veteran
- Nonviolence
- Pacifism in the United States
- People's Peace Treaty
- Presidio mutiny
- Soldiers in Revolt: GI Resistance During the Vietnam War, book about soldier & sailor resistance during the Vietnam War
- Stop Our Ship (SOS), anti-Vietnam War movement in and around the U.S. Navy
- Sir! No Sir!, a 2005 documentary about the anti-war movement in the ranks of the U.S. Armed Forces
- Sterling Hall bombing
- Soviet influence on the peace movement
- Teach-in
- The Spitting Image, a 1998 book by Vietnam veteran and sociology professor Jerry Lembcke which argues against the widely believed narrative that American soldiers were spat upon and insulted by antiwar protesters
- United States Servicemen's Fund
- Vietnam stab-in-the-back myth
- Writers and Editors War Tax Protest
- Vietnam Veterans Against the War
- Waging Peace in Vietnam
- Winter Soldier Investigation
