= Sam Durant =

American multimedia artist

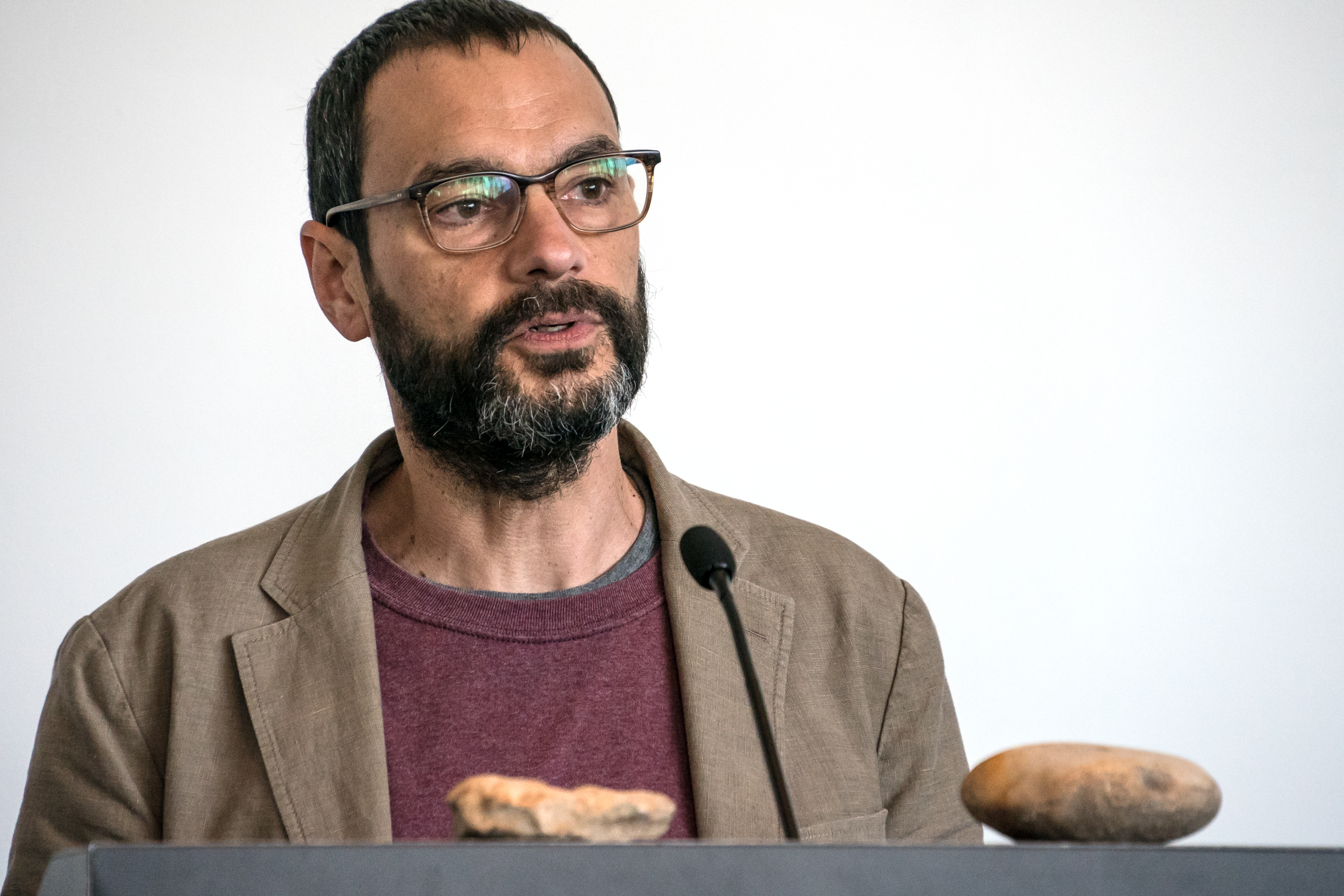
- Born: 1961 (age 64–65); Seattle, Washington, U.S
- Education: Massachusetts College of Art and Design (BFA); California Institute of the Arts (MFA)
- Occupation: Visual Artist
- Known for: Socially engaged public art, sculpture and installation
- Spouse: Ana Prvacki
- Website: www.samdurant.net

Sam Durant (born 1961, in Seattle) is a multimedia artist whose works engage social, political, and cultural issues. Often referencing American history, his work explores culture and politics, engaging subjects such as the civil rights movement, southern rock music, and modernism.

== Education ==
Durant received a BFA in sculpture in 1986 from the Massachusetts College of Art and an MFA from California Institute of the Arts.

From 2000 to 2022, Durant taught art at the California Institute of the Arts in Valencia, California. As of 2023, he is Professor of Sculpture in the Department of Art at the State Academy of Fine Arts in Stuttgart, Germany.

== Career ==
Durant's work has been exhibited internationally for more than three decades. Growing up near Boston, MA in the 1970s he experienced the radical pedagogy of A. S. Neill, Maria Montessori, John Holt, anti-war demonstrations and the desegregation of the public school system. Exposure to an educational culture emphasizing democratic ideals, racial equality and social justice created the foundation for Durant's artistic perspective. Often taking up forgotten events from the past, his works make connections with present and ongoing social and cultural issues. Durant's methodology is research based but with an emphasis on social engagement, often working with communities and groups in collaborative situations. His work since the 2010s has been publicly oriented and often participatory. He has had solo museum exhibitions at the Museum of Contemporary Art, Los Angeles, Kunstverein für die Rheinlande und Westfalen, Düsseldorf, S.M.A.K., Ghent, Belgium, and the Govett-Brewster Art Gallery in New Zealand. His work has been the subject of nine monographic catalogs. Durant's work has been included in numerous international exhibitions including Documenta 13, the Yokohama Triennial, the Venice, Sydney, Busan, Liverpool, Panama, and the Whitney Biennials. Durant has shown with several galleries including Blum & Poe in Los Angeles, Praz-Delavallade in Paris/Los Angeles and Sadie Coles HQ in London and Catriona Jeffries in Vancouver. He is currently represented by Paula Cooper Gallery in New York and Blum Gallery, Los Angeles, Tokyo and New York.

=== 1990s ===
His work in the early 90s was influenced by his experiences working in the building trades as a carpenter and home builder. After seeing the seminal exhibition Blueprints for Modern Living at the Museum of Contemporary Art in Los Angeles Durant began several years of work investigating the social dynamics and class politics of Modernist architecture and design. He made collages, drawings and models, many of which were included in his survey show at MoCA in 2002. He subsequently was inspired by the work of Robert Smithson, an artist interested in history and entropy. Smithson's legendary work Partially Buried Woodshed at Kent State University in Ohio led Durant to his ongoing interest in Monuments and Memorials.

=== 2000s ===
In 2005, his exhibition "Proposal for White and Indian Dead Monument Transpositions, Washington D.C." was shown at the Paula Cooper Gallery in New York. This work developed out of a residency at the Walker Art Center in 2002. The work re-contextualises memorials to victims of the conquest of North America by reproduced 30 monuments from the period of US history known as the 'Indian Wars' that are based on similarities to the massive Washington Monument obelisk. In 2007, he compiled and edited a comprehensive monograph of Black Panther artist Emory Douglas’ work. He curated two exhibitions of Douglas' work, Black Panther: the Revolutionary Art of Emory Douglas at The Museum of Contemporary Art in Los Angeles (2007) and the New Museum in New York (2009). He is a co-founder of Transforma, a cultural rebuilding collective project in New Orleans from 2005 to 2010. In addition, he was a finalist for the 2008 Hugo Boss Prize and has received a United States Artists Broad Fellowship and the Rappaport Art Prize.

=== 2010s ===
In a turn to public work Durant was an artist in residence at the Getty Center that led to What#isamuseum (2013) a year-long participatory project. Working with curator Pedro Alonzo he produced Labyrinth (2015) in Philadelphia which addressed mass incarceration and The Meeting House (2016) in Concord, MA that took up the subject of race in colonial and contemporary New England. Because of the often controversial subject matter of his work the large scale interactive sculpture entitled Scaffold (2012) was protested when the Walker Art Center in Minneapolis attempted to install it in 2017. The sculpture represented several significant gallows from US history and was meant to encourage reflection on the nation's use of capital punishment. A group of protesters led by Dakota tribal members objected to the inclusion of an actual size replica of the Mankato Gallows and the sculpture was subsequently removed. His most recent public work Untitled (drone) was the second commission for the High Line Plinth in New York. It raised the issues of drone warfare and surveillance in American society. Other notable works have encompassed Italian anarchism, cartographic histories of capitalism, gestures of everyday refusal and a decolonizing realignment of Surrealism through incorporating artists and writers from the former French colonial world, like Aimé Césaire and Joyce Mansour.

=== 2020s ===
In recent years Durant has done several projects about the Nonaligned Movement. The work Proposal for Nonaligned Monuments, Free Movement (2020) his travelling project Nonaligned Echoes, Gifts and Returns (2024) began in Podgorica, Montenegro and Ljubijana, Slovenia and includes a curated selection from the collection of the "Josip Broz Tito" Art Gallery of the Nonaligned Countries.

== Collections ==
His work can be found in many public collections including The Art Gallery of Western Australia in Perth, Tate Modern in London, Project Row Houses in Houston, the Walker Art Center in Minneapolis, and the Museum of Modern Art in New York.

== Bibliography ==
- Sam Durant et al., The Death of the Artist (New York: Cabinet Books, 2019). ISBN 9781932698893, 1932698892
