= Nationwide student anti-war strike of 1970 =

American anti-war protest

Student strike of 1970
- Part of opposition to United States involvement in the Vietnam War
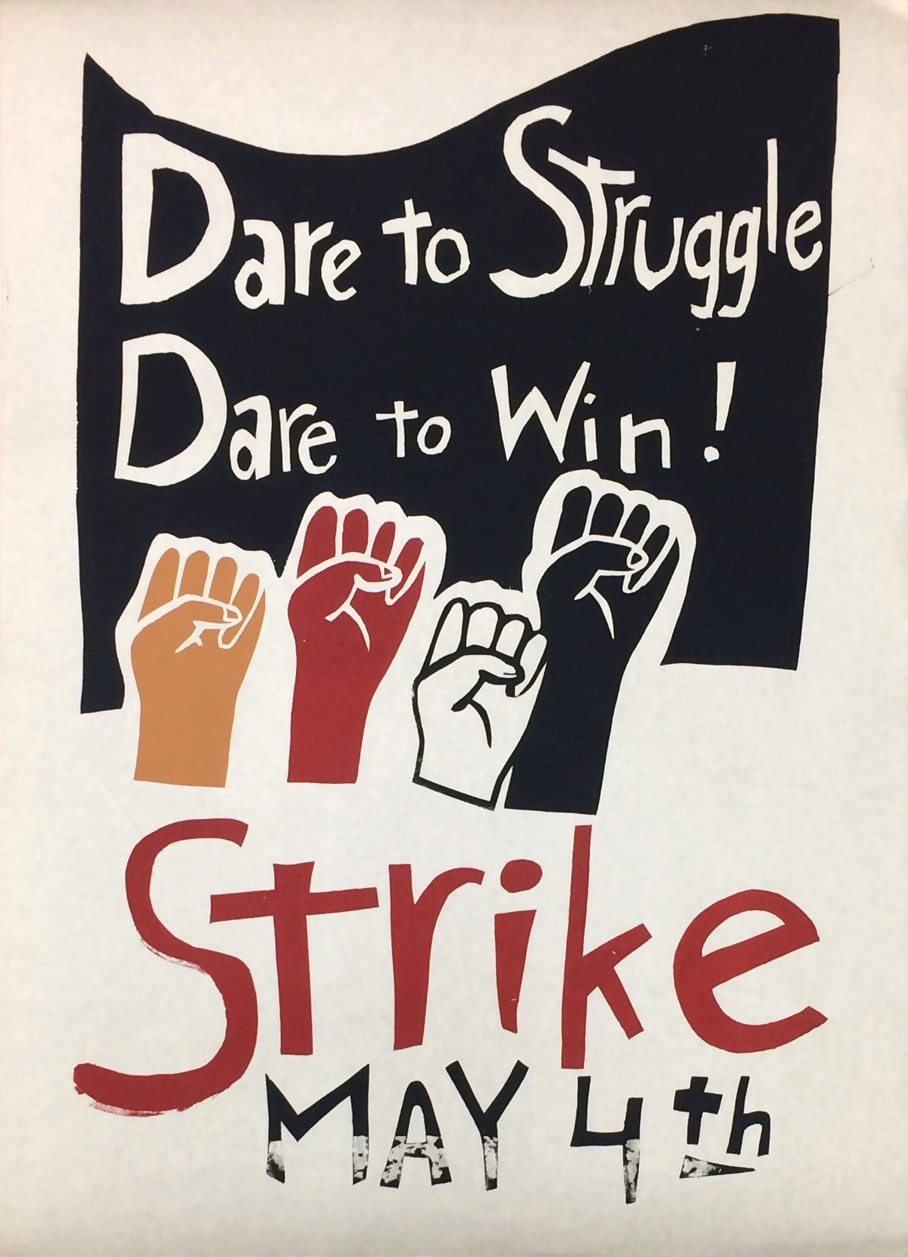
- Poster advertising the student strike
- Date: May 1–8, 1970
- Location: United States
- Caused by: United States Involvement in the Vietnam War; Cambodian Campaign; Kent State shootings
- Methods: Strikes; Rioting
- Result: Political backlash

The first nationwide student strike erupted across the United States in May 1970, initially in response to the US expansion of the Vietnam War into neighboring Cambodia. The strike began on May 1 with walk-outs from university, college, and high school classrooms on nearly 900 campuses across the United States. It increased dramatically following the shooting of students at Kent State University in Ohio by National Guardsmen on May 4. While a number of violent incidents occurred during the protests, for the most part, they were peaceful.

== History ==
=== Announcement of Cambodian campaign ===
President Richard Nixon authorized the expansion of the Vietnam War into Cambodia on April 28, 1970, with a televised announcement of the expansion occurring on April 30. On May 1, protests on college campuses and in cities throughout the U.S. began. In Seattle, over a thousand protestors gathered at the Federal Courthouse and cheered speakers. Significant protests also occurred at the University of Maryland, the University of Cincinnati, and Princeton University.

=== Kent State shootings and reactions ===
On May 1 at Kent State University in Ohio, students in the graduate history department organized a protest of about 500 at the Victory Bell on the Commons. May 2, unidentified students burned down the ROTC building at Kent State. On May 4, Ohio National Guardsmen opened fire without warning on protesters, killing four students and wounding nine others during a large demonstration at the school. In the following days, more than 450 university, college, and high school campuses across the country experienced student strikes, along with both violent and non-violent protests that involved more than 4 million students.

=== Continued protests ===
While opposition to the Vietnam War had been simmering on American campuses for several years, and the idea of a strike had been introduced by the Moratorium to End the War in Vietnam, which advocated a general strike on the 15th of every month until the war ended, the Kent State shootings seemed to provide the spark for students across the US to adopt the strike tactic.

On May 7, violent protests began at the University of Washington with some students smashing windows in their Applied Physics laboratory and throwing rocks at the police while chanting "the pigs are coming!"

On May 8, ten days after Nixon announced the Cambodian invasion (and 4 days after the Kent State shootings), 100,000 protesters gathered in Washington and another 150,000 in San Francisco. Nationwide, students turned their anger on what was often the nearest military facility—college and university Reserve Officers' Training Corps (ROTC) offices. All told, 30 ROTC buildings went up in flames or were bombed. There were violent clashes between students and police at 26 schools and National Guard units were mobilized on 21 campuses in 16 states. Walkouts and protests were reported by the National Strike Information Center on at least 883 campuses across the country, with heavy concentrations in New England, the Midwest, and California. Over a million students participated.

For the most part, however, the protests were peaceful — if often tense. Students at New York University, for example, hung a banner out of a window which read "They Can't Kill Us All."

== Protests at universities ==
=== Ohio University ===
On May 4, 1970, an estimated 3,000 Ohio University (OU) students met to discuss the possibility of a peaceful strike on the Athens campus in response to the invasion of Cambodia and the Kent State shootings. 2,500 students voted in favor of the strike. The same day Taylor Culbert, Vice President of Academic Affairs, read aloud a speech to the gathered students written by OU President Claude Sowle. In his remarks, Sowle spoke in favor of peaceful discussions at OU and offered to help facilitate them. Still, he made it clear that the administration would not tolerate acts of violence.

The student strike began on May 5. On this date, 4,000 students took part in a rally in the Grover Center. The two main speakers at the rally were President Sowle and life photographer Gordon Parks. Sowle praised the protesters for the lack of violence, but he said he would not close down the university for the strike. He stated, “We will protect the freedom of those who want to go to class. The University has a responsibility to protect the rights of those students who wish to attend class as much as your right not to attend classes.” The students at the rally agreed to hold a “March Against Death” the following day.

On May 6, over 2,500 people participated in a “March Against Murder”. It began on the College Green and traveled past the Athens County Selective Service Office and the National Guard Armory. The peaceful protest “marked the climax of a two-day ‘student strike’ on campus.” Following the march, students held sit-ins and marches on Athens streets. At night, another mass meeting of some 3,000 people was held to determine what, if any, further protests should be held but no consensus was reached. In a statement, President Sowle expressed support for the peaceful protests and said he was “confident” OU would remain open. “Each student,” stated Sowle, “must express his concern in whatever way he deems appropriate. However, we must leave the opportunity for those who want to attend class.”

On May 7, the protests grew more confrontational and violent. Students occupied Athens businesses, nearly thirty of which closed. There was a firebombing at the ROTC supply room in Peden Stadium, which caused an estimated $4,000 worth of damage. FBI investigators were called in to investigate the firebombing. There was also a bomb threat that led to the evacuation of Woolworths. At the same time, hundreds of students peacefully gathered on campus throughout the day and night.

On May 8, twenty-five students from the newly formed Committee on Issues and Action (COIA) met with President Sowle at the university airport after he returned from Washington where he appeared on a national television program on Vietnam and campus protests. The students wanted to find ways to keep the university open but still have peaceful protests and discussions. The president said that he was “glad” that the COIA requested the meeting and that they would meet again in the next twenty-four hours. Also, students tried to get Athens businesses to close. Most of the businesses they approached were already closed. However, the BBF restaurant refused to close, so about 100 students participated in a sit-in. An OU professor who was in the restaurant asked the students, “What is to gain by shutting down the stores. Your intimidation is a form of violence.” The students eventually left the restaurant and made a couple more stops before being met by the police who asked the students to return to the College Green, where students continued to gather until late at night.

On Saturday, May 10, COIA members met with President Sowle about cancelling classes on Tuesday for a campus discussion on national problems, but he refused to do so. The administration also banned two out of three speakers scheduled to speak at a rally sponsored by the Athens Peace Committee (APC), which was to be held at the Grover Center on Monday night. Sowle later allowed the two to speak.

On May 11, an outbreak of more violence threatened to close the university. After the APC held a mass rally at the Grover Center, a group of about seventy-five students forced their way into the Chubb Library, occupied it, and issued a list of demands. The list included the end of ROTC and other expressions of the “war machine” on campus. The students remained in the building throughout the night. The same night someone firebombed the Nelson Commons cafeteria causing more than $100,000 in damage. It took the Athens fire department an hour to put the fire out. Someone also started a trash fire in the basement in the South Green dormitory.

By May 12, the ability to maintain peace on the campus was quickly deteriorating. There were bomb threats, trash fires, and false fire reports. A group of fifty students presented a list of proposals to President Sowle. They demanded he to act upon seven of their proposals, which called for new classes on “the military industrial complex” and other topics, within twenty-four hours or the students threatened to “close the University down physically since it is already closed down academically.” More than 100 student and faculty marshals were placed around the university with the specific instructions to watch for “suspicious characters and happenings.” Athens police banned the use of gasoline in containers in order to stop acts of arson.

On the night of May 13, a group of about 350 students met at Baker Center to discuss President Sowle’s suspension of seven students for creating a “clear and present danger” on campus. The Faculty Senate passed a resolution to reinstate the students until a hearing could be held, but Sowle rejected it. After two hours of discussion, the group walked around the residence greens in a “solidarity march”. The group then moved to Cutler Hall, where rocks and bricks were thrown through building windows. Sowle tried to negotiate with the group but was shouted down and left after more rocks were thrown. The group tried to move into the downtown area but was met by Athens Police in riot gear. After rocks and bricks were thrown at the police, they responded by firing canisters of pepper gas. Confrontations between students and the police went on throughout the night. Seven students were arrested.

In the early morning of May 15, President Sowle, following a second night of violence, announced the closing of Ohio University for the remainder of the term and requested the National Guard be sent to Athens. In recorded remarks, Sowle said it was “sad indeed that this inspiring period in the history of Ohio University must end in such an unfortunate way,” but he praised “the magnificent efforts of the great majority of faculty, students and staff to keep the University open. We tried, but we failed.” A few hours later, the first of 1500 National Guardsmen began to arrive in Athens. The violence started around 11:05pm when approximately 800 students broke away from a larger, campus gathering and attempted to move into the downtown area. Athens police fired tear gas at the group of students, and they fired rocks, bricks, and other objects at police and downtown stores. Many store windows were broken. Confrontations between police and students went on for several hours, and there was considerable damage. A university vehicle was firebombed and destroyed. There was also a small fire in a university lab. Windows on several university buildings were broken. Twenty-six students were treated for injuries. In the words of one anonymous student protestor, “Ohio University had to close.” “It was necessary, almost inevitable, that the University close for the simple reason that for the last ten years students and others have been peacefully protesting the war in Vietnam and where has it got them—into Cambodia.”

=== Wesleyan University ===
On May 4, 1970, the student body of Wesleyan University joined in the strike with permission from university President Etherington. Discussions about the Vietnam War and issues with military recruitment on Wesleyan's campus had been pervasive for two years, but organized protests began a few days after President Nixon's announcement of the Cambodian campaign. The protests shut down the school's classes and schoolwork for the rest of the spring semester, and students were expected to finish their work later in the summer.

=== University of Virginia ===
Strike activities at UVA were highly attended, and led to traffic disruptions and arrests. Marching students halted traffic on highways 250 and 29, and during the worst of the strike, Mayflower moving vans were used as temporary holding cells for arrested protesters. On May 6, students, locals, and people who traveled from across Virginia gathered for a day of rallies at UVA, where state protests were now centered. UVA President Edgar Shannon spoke to the crowd, and was pelted with marshmallows. Shannon had been presented with a list of nine demands from the Student Council, led by its first African American president, James Roebuck. That night, Yippie Jerry Rubin and civil-rights lawyer William Kunstler spoke to an audience of 8,000 at University Hall, a basketball arena not far from the university's historic center in Charlottesville, encouraging students to close down universities nationwide.

On May 5, the University received an injunction to prevent students from occupying Maury Hall, the ROTC building; despite this, a small number of protesters remained there until a small fire broke out in the early hours of Thursday, May 7, forcing them to evacuate. By Friday, May 8, the protests led to police action. The strike had lasting consequences in the months that followed. Student reporting at the time argued that a new Alumni Association was being founded directly in response to strike supporters' activities in an effort to ensure that conservative donors continued to give to the university.

=== Virginia Commonwealth University ===
On May 6, 500 students boycotted classes after Virginia Commonwealth University president refused their request that he close the university.

=== Virginia Polytechnic Institute ===
On May 13, 1970, 3,000 Virginia Tech students protested and 57 participated in a hunger strike.

=== Richmond College ===
The student-led Richmond College (now the University of Richmond) Senate adopted a resolution condemning Nixon's move into Cambodia.

=== Yale University ===
Yale's students were divided during the 1970 protests. Kingman Brewster, Jr. was Yale's president at the time; he had recently risen in popularity among the student body for his tacit support of students' activism in support of fair trials of accused Black Panther Party members. In the lead up to protests over involvement in Cambodia, Brewster urged students not to participate in the strikes and protests and continue going to class as usual, as Yale students had been boycotting classes to join the national student strike against the invasion of Cambodia. By May 4, the Yale Daily News announced that it didn't support involvement in the students strikes occurring across the nation. This decision made it the only Ivy League paper to disagree with the protests. Consequently, fifty protestors visited the News offices and called the editors fascist pigs. In its editorial, the Yale Daily News warned that "radical rhetoric and sporadic violence, such as marked the weekend demonstrations at Yale, only added fuel to the ‘demagoguery of Richard Nixon, Spiro Agnew, John Mitchell and the other hyenas of the right.'"

=== University of Texas at Austin ===
Following the deaths of the Kent State students, a candlelit vigil was held on campus. A few days later, on May 8, 1970, thousands of students marched along Guadalupe Street toward the Texas State Capitol in protest.

== Political reactions ==
=== Fears of insurrection ===
The protests and strikes had a dramatic impact, and convinced many Americans, particularly within the administration of President Richard Nixon, that the nation was on the verge of insurrection. Ray Price, Nixon's chief speechwriter from 1969–74, recalled the Washington demonstrations saying, "The city was an armed camp. The mobs were smashing windows, slashing tires, dragging parked cars into intersections, even throwing bedsprings off overpasses into the traffic down below. This was the quote, 'student protest. That's not student protest, that's civil war'."

Not only was Nixon taken to Camp David for two days for his own protection, but Charles Colson (Counsel to President Nixon from 1969 to 1973) stated that the military was called up to protect the administration from the angry students, he recalled that "The 82nd Airborne was in the basement of the executive office building, so I went down just to talk to some of the guys and walk among them, and they're lying on the floor leaning on their packs and their helmets and their cartridge belts and their rifles cocked and you’re thinking, 'This can't be the United States of America. This is not the greatest free democracy in the world. This is a nation at war with itself.'"

=== Nixon's attempted dialogue with protesting students ===
The student protests in Washington also prompted an unusual and widely-noted attempt by President Nixon to reach out to the disaffected students. As historian Stanley Karnow reported in his book Vietnam: A History, on May 9, 1970 the President appeared at 4:15 a.m. on the steps of the Lincoln Memorial to discuss the war with 30 student dissidents who were conducting a vigil there. According to Karnow, Nixon "treated them to a clumsy and condescending monologue, which he made public in an awkward attempt to display his benevolence." Nixon had been trailed by White House Deputy for Domestic Affairs Egil Krogh, who saw it differently than Karnow, saying, "I thought it was a very significant and major effort to reach out."

In the end, neither side could convince the other, and after meeting with the students Nixon expressed his view that those in the anti-war movement were the pawns of foreign communists. After the student protests, Nixon asked H. R. Haldeman to consider the Huston Plan, which would have used illegal procedures to gather information on the leaders of the anti-war movement. Only the resistance of FBI head J. Edgar Hoover stopped the plan.

=== President's Commission on Campus Unrest ===
As a direct result of the student strike, on June 13, 1970, President Nixon established the President's Commission on Campus Unrest, which became known as the Scranton Commission after its chairman, former Pennsylvania governor William Scranton. Scranton was asked to study the dissent, disorder, and violence breaking out on college and university campuses.

=== Conservative backlash ===
The student protests provoked supporters of the Vietnam War and the Nixon Administration to counter-demonstrate. In contrast to the noisy student protests, Administration supporters viewed themselves as "the Silent Majority" (a phrase coined by Nixon speechwriter Patrick Buchanan).

In one instance, in New York City on May 8, construction workers attacked student protesters in what came to be called the Hard Hat Riot.

== See also ==
- Counterculture of the 1960s
- Jackson State killings
- List of incidents of civil unrest in the United States
- Opposition to the Vietnam War
- The University of New Mexico bayoneting incident
