= Kent State shootings =

1970 shootings in Kent, Ohio, US

- John Filo's Pulitzer Prize–winning photograph of Mary Ann Vecchio kneeling over the dead body of Jeffrey Miller minutes after the unarmed student was fatally shot by an Ohio National Guardsman
- Location: Kent State University, Kent, Ohio, United States
- Date: May 4, 1970; 56 years ago 12:24 p.m. (Eastern Daylight Time: UTC−4)
- Attack type: Mass shooting, Mass murder, School shooting
- Deaths: 4
- Injuries: 9
- Victims: Kent State University students & Vietnam War protesters
- Perpetrator: Ohio Army National Guard
- Accused: Lawrence Shafer; James McGee; James Pierce; William Perkins; Ralph Zoller; Barry Morris; Leon H. Smith; Matthew J. McManus
- Charges: Deprivation of rights under color of law
- Verdict: Not guilty
- Judge: Frank J. Battisti
- May 4, 1970, Kent State Shootings Site
- U.S. National Register of Historic Places
- U.S. National Historic Landmark
- Location within Ohio Location within the United States
- Location: 0.5 mi. SE of the intersection of E. Main St. and S. Lincoln St., Kent, Ohio
- Coordinates: 41.1501°N 81.3433°W
- Area: 17.24 acres (6.98 ha)
- NRHP reference No.: 10000046

Significant dates
- Added to NRHP: February 23, 2010
- Designated NHL: December 23, 2016

The Kent State shootings (also known as the Kent State massacre) were the killing of four and wounding of nine unarmed college students by the Ohio National Guard on the Kent State University campus in Kent, Ohio, United States. The shootings took place on May 4, 1970, after days of escalating violence, during a rally opposing the expanding involvement of the Vietnam War into Cambodia by United States military forces, as well as protesting the National Guard presence on campus and the draft. Twenty-eight National Guard soldiers fired about 67 rounds over 13 seconds, killing four students and wounding nine others, one of whom sustained permanent paralysis. Students Allison Krause (19), Jeffrey Miller (20), and Sandra Lee Scheuer (20) died on the scene, while William Schroeder (19) was pronounced dead at Robinson Memorial Hospital in nearby Ravenna shortly afterward.

Krause and Miller were among the more than 300 students who gathered to protest the expansion of the Cambodian campaign, which President Richard Nixon had announced in an April 30 television address. Scheuer and Schroeder were in the crowd of several hundred others who had been observing the proceedings more than 300 feet (91 m) from the firing line; like most observers, they watched the protest during a break between their classes.

The shootings triggered immediate and massive outrage on campuses around the country. It increased participation in the student strike that began on May 1. Ultimately, more than 4 million students participated in organized walk-outs at hundreds of universities, colleges, and high schools. The shootings and the strike affected public opinion at an already socially contentious time over the role of the United States in the Vietnam War.

Eight of the shooters were charged with depriving the students of their civil rights, but were acquitted in a bench trial. The trial judge stated, "It is vital that state and National Guard officials not regard this decision as authorizing or approving the use of force against demonstrators, whatever the occasion of the issue involved. Such use of force is, and was, deplorable."

== Background ==
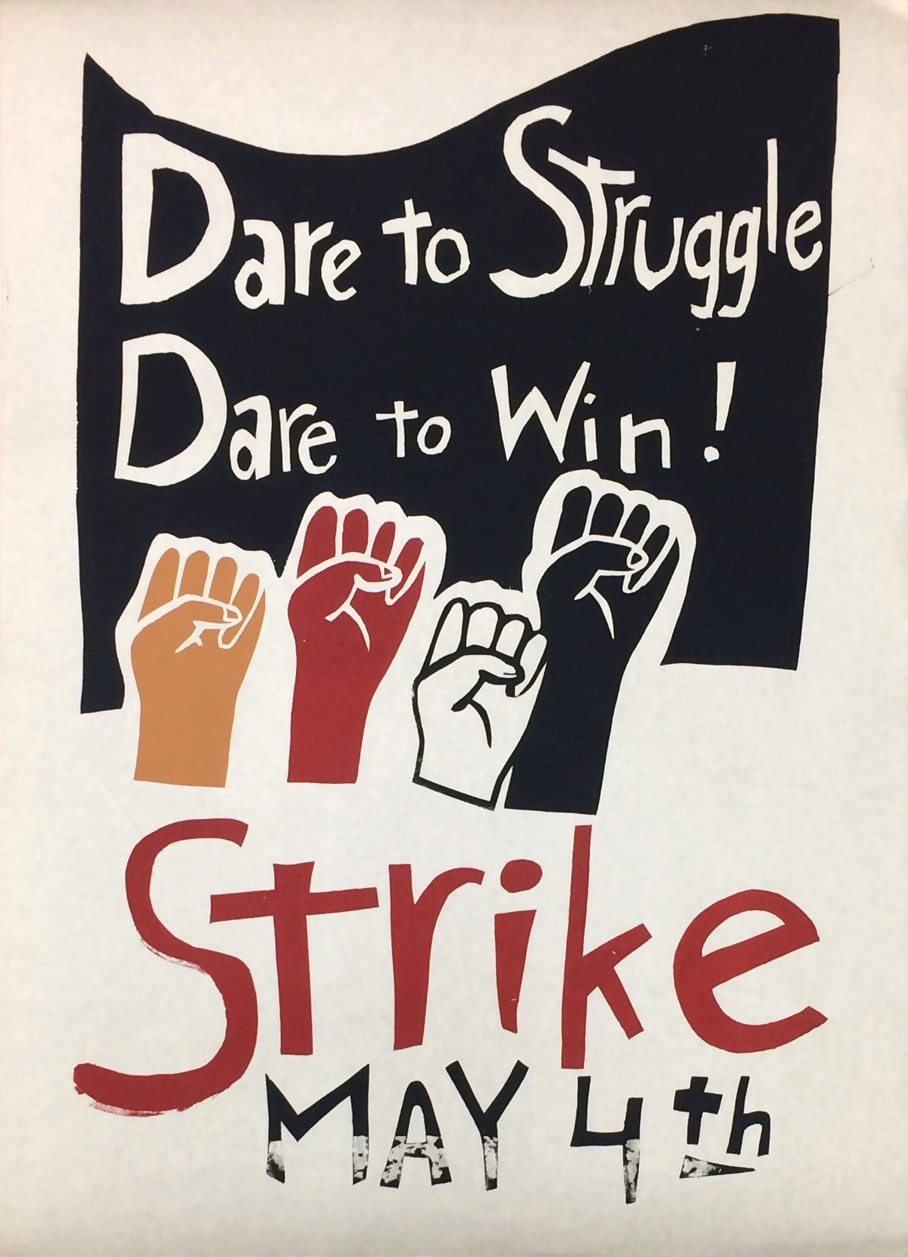
Poster calling for a nationwide student anti-war strike on May 4, 1970

President John F. Kennedy increased U.S. involvement in the Vietnam War, sending 16,000 advisors in 1963, up from the 900 that President Dwight D. Eisenhower sent. Lyndon B. Johnson significantly escalated involvement, raising the number of American troops in Vietnam to 100,000 in 1965, and eventually to more than 500,000 combat troops in 1968 with no tangible results and with increasing opposition and protests at home. When Richard M. Nixon was elected in 1968, he promised to end the conflict, claiming he had a secret plan. According to Walter Isaacson, Nixon concluded soon after taking office that the Vietnam War could not be won, and he was determined to end it quickly. The Mỹ Lai massacre by American troops of 347 Vietnamese villagers, exposed in November 1969, heightened opposition to the war.

On April 29, 1970, U.S. and South Vietnamese forces invaded eastern Cambodia with the stated goal of defeating the North Vietnamese and Viet Cong troops based there. The expansion of the war into Cambodia angered those who believed it only exacerbated the conflict and violated a neutral nation's sovereignty. Across the U.S., campuses erupted in protests in what Time called "a nation-wide student strike", setting the stage for the events of early May 1970.

In April 1970, Nixon told Congress that he would end undergraduate student draft deferments by Executive Order if authorized by Congress to do so. This request was approved by the Senate Armed Services Committee on April 23. After the draft reforms of 1971 students could only postpone their service until the end of the semester, or the end of the school year for seniors. This remains the law.

=== Kent State protest activity, 1966–1970 ===
During the 1966 Homecoming Parade, protesters walked dressed in military paraphernalia with gas masks.

In the fall of 1968, the Students for a Democratic Society (SDS) and Black United Students staged a sit-in to protest against police recruiters on campus. 250 black students walked off campus in a successful amnesty bid for the protesters.

On April 1, 1969, SDS members attempted to enter the administration building with a list of demands where they clashed with police. In response, the university revoked the Kent State SDS chapter charter. On April 16, a disciplinary hearing involving two protesters resulted in a confrontation between supporters and opponents of SDS. The Ohio State Highway Patrol was called, and 58 people were arrested. Four SDS leaders spent six months in prison due to the incident.

On April 10, 1970, Jerry Rubin, a leader of the Youth International Party (also known as the Yippies), spoke on campus. In remarks reported locally, he said: "The first part of the Yippie program is to kill your parents. They are the first oppressors." Two weeks after that, Bill Arthrell, an SDS member and former student, distributed flyers to an event where he said he was going to napalm a dog. The event turned out to be an anti-napalm teach-in.

== Timeline ==
=== Thursday, April 30 ===
President Nixon announced that the "Cambodian Incursion" had been launched by United States combat forces.

=== Friday, May 1 ===
At Kent State University, a demonstration with about 500 students was held on May 1 on the Commons, a grassy knoll in the center of campus traditionally used as a gathering place for rallies and protests. As the crowd dispersed to attend classes by 1 pm, another rally was planned for May 4 to continue the protest of the expansion of the Vietnam War into Cambodia. There was widespread anger, and many protesters called to "bring the war home." A group of history students buried a copy of the United States Constitution to symbolize that Nixon had killed it. A sign was put on a tree asking: "Why is the ROTC building still standing?" A further protest organised by the Black United Students (BUS) also took place during the afternoon, to demonstrate solidarity with antiwar protests at Kent State University and at The Ohio State University; attracting around 400 students, and ending peacefully at 3:45 pm.

Further issues arose following President Nixon's arrival at the Pentagon later during the day. Upon his arrival he was greeted by a group of Pentagon employees; with one female employee commenting in regards to Nixon's speech announcing the launch of the Cambodian Incursion: "I loved your speech. It made me proud to be an American". This prompted Nixon's controversial response:

"You see these bums, you know, blowing up the campuses. Listen, the boys that are on the college campuses today are the luckiest people in the world, going to the greatest universities, and here they are burning up the books, storming around this issue. You name it. Get rid of the war there will be another one."

Around midnight, unidentified people left a bar, began throwing beer bottles at a police car and broke several windows in downtown storefronts. In the process, they broke a bank window, activating the alarm. The news spread quickly, and several bars closed early to avoid trouble. Before long, more people had joined the vandalism.

By the time police arrived, a crowd of 120 had already gathered. Some people from the crowd lit a small bonfire in the street. The crowd appeared to be a mix of bikers, students, and transient people. A few crowd members threw beer bottles at the police and then started yelling obscenities at them.

The entire Kent police force was called to duty, as well as officers from the county and surrounding communities. Kent Mayor LeRoy Satrom declared a state of emergency, called the office of Ohio Governor Jim Rhodes to seek assistance, and ordered all of the bars to be closed. The decision to close the bars early only increased tensions in the area. Police eventually succeeded in using tear gas to disperse the crowd from downtown, forcing them to move several blocks back to the campus.

=== Saturday, May 2 ===
City officials and downtown businesses received threats, and rumors proliferated that radical revolutionaries were in Kent to destroy the city and university. Several merchants reported they were told that their businesses would be burned down if they did not display anti-war slogans. Kent's police chief told the mayor that according to a reliable informant, the ROTC building, the local army recruiting station, and the post office had been targeted for destruction that night. There were unconfirmed rumors of students with caches of arms, plots to spike the local water supply with LSD, and of students building tunnels to blow up the town's main store. Satrom met with Kent city officials and a representative of the Ohio Army National Guard. Because of the rumors and threats, Satrom feared that local officials would not be able to handle future disturbances. Following the meeting, Satrom decided to call Rhodes and request that the National Guard be sent to Kent, a request granted immediately.

The decision to call in the National Guard was made at 5:00 pm, but the guard did not arrive in town that evening until around 10 pm. By this time, a large demonstration was underway on the campus, and the campus Reserve Officers' Training Corps (ROTC) building was burning. The arsonists were never apprehended, and no one was injured in the fire. According to the report of the President's Commission on Campus Unrest:

Information developed by an FBI investigation of the ROTC building fire indicates that, of those who participated actively, a significant portion weren't Kent State students. There is also evidence to suggest that the burning was planned beforehand: railroad flares, a machete, and ice picks are not customarily carried to peaceful rallies.

There were reports that some Kent firemen and police officers were struck by rocks and other objects while attempting to extinguish the blaze. Several fire engine companies had to be called because protesters carried the fire hose into the Commons and slashed it. The National Guard made numerous arrests, mostly for curfew violations, and used tear gas; at least one student was wounded with a bayonet.

=== Sunday, May 3 ===
During a press conference at the Kent firehouse, an emotional Governor Rhodes pounded on the desk, which can be heard in the recording of his speech. He called the student protesters un-American, referring to them as revolutionaries set on destroying higher education in Ohio.

We've seen here at the city of Kent especially, probably the most vicious form of campus-oriented violence yet perpetrated by dissident groups... they make definite plans of burning, destroying, and throwing rocks at police and at the National Guard and the Highway Patrol. ...this is when we're going to use every part of the law enforcement agency of Ohio to drive them out of Kent. We are going to eradicate the problem. We're not going to treat the symptoms. ...and these people just move from one campus to the other and terrorize the community. They're worse than the brown shirts and the communist element and also the night riders and the vigilantes. They're the worst type of people that we harbor in America. Now I want to say this. They are not going to take over [the] campus. I think that we're up against the strongest, well-trained, militant, revolutionary group that has ever assembled in America.

Rhodes also claimed he would obtain a court order declaring a state of emergency that would ban further demonstrations and gave the impression that a situation akin to martial law had been declared; however, he never attempted to obtain such an order.

During the day, some students came to downtown Kent to help with clean-up efforts after the rioting, actions which were met with mixed reactions from local business people. Mayor Satrom, under pressure from frightened citizens, ordered a curfew until further notice.

Around 8 pm, another rally was held on the campus Commons. By 8:45 pm, the Guardsmen used tear gas to disperse the crowd, and the students reassembled at the intersection of Lincoln and Main, holding a sit-in with the hopes of gaining a meeting with Mayor Satrom and University President Robert White. At 11:00 pm, the Guard announced that a curfew had gone into effect and began forcing the students back to their dorms. A few students were bayoneted by Guardsmen.

=== Monday, May 4 ===
On Monday, May 4, a protest was scheduled to be held at noon, as planned three days earlier. University officials attempted to ban the gathering, handing out 12,000 leaflets stating that the event was canceled. Despite these efforts, an estimated 2,000 people gathered on the university's Commons, near Taylor Hall. The protest began with the ringing of the campus's iron Victory Bell (which had historically been used to signal victories in football games) to mark the beginning of the rally, and the first protester began to speak.

According to most estimates, some 200–300 protesters gathered around the Victory Bell on the Commons, with some 1,000 more gathered on a hill behind the first crowd. The crowd was largely made up of students enrolled at the university, with a few non-students (that included Kent State dropouts and high school students) also present. The crowd appeared leaderless and was initially peaceful and relatively quiet. One person made a short speech, and some protesters carried flags.

==== Orders to disperse ====
Companies A and C, 145th Infantry and Troop G of the 107th Armored Cavalry, Ohio National Guard (ARNG), the units on the campus grounds, under the command of Brigadier General Robert Canterbury, attempted to disperse the students. The legality of the order to disperse was debated during a subsequent wrongful death and injury trial. On appeal, the United States Court of Appeals for the Sixth Circuit ruled that authorities did indeed have the right to disperse the crowd.

At about noon, the National Guard obtained a bullhorn from the university police department and used it to order the crowd to disperse. However, the announcement was too faint to hear as it elicited no response from the crowd. Campus patrolman Harold Rice, accompanied by three guardsmen, then approached the crowd in a National Guard Jeep, again using the bullhorn to order the students to disperse. Students responded by making obscene gestures at the Jeep, singing protest songs, and chanting. At some point, a few rocks were thrown at the Jeep as it drove by the crowd, with one rock striking the Jeep and a second one striking a guardsman, but without causing any damage. The crowd ignored repeated orders to disperse.

==== First attempt to disperse the crowd with tear gas ====
After the crowd failed to follow the order to disperse, grenadiers were ordered to fire tear gas from M79 grenade launchers, but the canisters fell short and managed only to make the protesters retreat somewhat from their previous positions. The tear gas was also made ineffective by the wind. Some protesters lobbed the canisters back at the Guard to the crowd's merriment. The crowd also began to chant "Pigs off campus". Another demand to disperse was made over the loudspeaker but simply elicited more oppositional chanting.

==== National Guard advance ====
After repeatedly failing to disperse the crowd, a group of 96 National Guard troops from A Company and Company C, 145th Infantry, and Troop G, 107th Armored Cavalry, were ordered to advance. The guardsmen had their weapons "locked and loaded" (according to standard Ohio National Guard rules) and affixed with bayonets. Most carried M1 Garand rifles, with some also carrying .45 handguns, a few carrying shotguns with No. 7 birdshot and 00 buckshot munitions, and one officer carrying a 22 Beretta handgun. Before advancing, Company C was instructed to fire only into the air and for only a single guardsman to fire. It is unknown whether the other two National Guard groups received any instructions about firing.

As the advancing guardsmen approached the crowd, tear gas was again fired at the crowd, making the protesters retreat. At this point, some protesters threw stones at the Guard to no significant effect. Some students may have brought rocks to the protest anticipating a confrontation.

The students retreated up and over Blanket Hill, heading out of the Commons area. Once over the hill, the students, in a loose group, moved northeast along the front of Taylor Hall, with some continuing toward a parking lot in front of Prentice Hall (slightly northeast of and perpendicular to Taylor Hall). The guardsmen pursued the protesters over the hill, but rather than veering left as the protesters had, they continued straight, heading toward an athletic practice field enclosed by a chain link fence. Here they remained for about 10 minutes, unsure of how to get out of the area short of retracing their path: they had boxed themselves into a fenced-in corner. During this time, the bulk of the students assembled to the left and front of the guardsmen, approximately 150 to 225 ft (46 to 69 m) away, on the veranda of Taylor Hall. Others were scattered between Taylor Hall and the Prentice Hall parking lot, while still others were standing in the parking lot, or dispersing through the lot as they had been previously ordered. While on the practice field, the guardsmen generally faced the parking lot, about 100 yards (91 m) away. At one point, the guardsmen formed a loose huddle and appeared to be talking to one another. They had cleared the protesters from the Commons area, and many students had left.

Some students who had retreated beyond the practice field fence obtained rocks and possibly other objects with which they again began pelting the guardsmen. The number of rock throwers is unknown, with estimates of 10–50 throwers. According to an FBI assessment, rock-throwing peaked at this point. Tear gas was again fired at crowds at multiple locations.

Just before departing the practice field, some members of Troop G were ordered to kneel and aim their weapons toward the parking lot. The troops did so, but none of them fired. At the same time, one person (likely an officer) fired a handgun into the air. The Guard was then ordered to regroup and move up the hill past Taylor Hall. Protesters began following the Guard as it retraced its steps up the hill. Some guardsmen claim to have been struck by rocks as they retreated up the hill. The crowd on top of the hill parted to allow the guardsmen to pass through. After reaching the crest of Taylor Hall, the Guard fired at the protesters following them. The guardsmen gave no verbal warning to the protesters before opening fire.

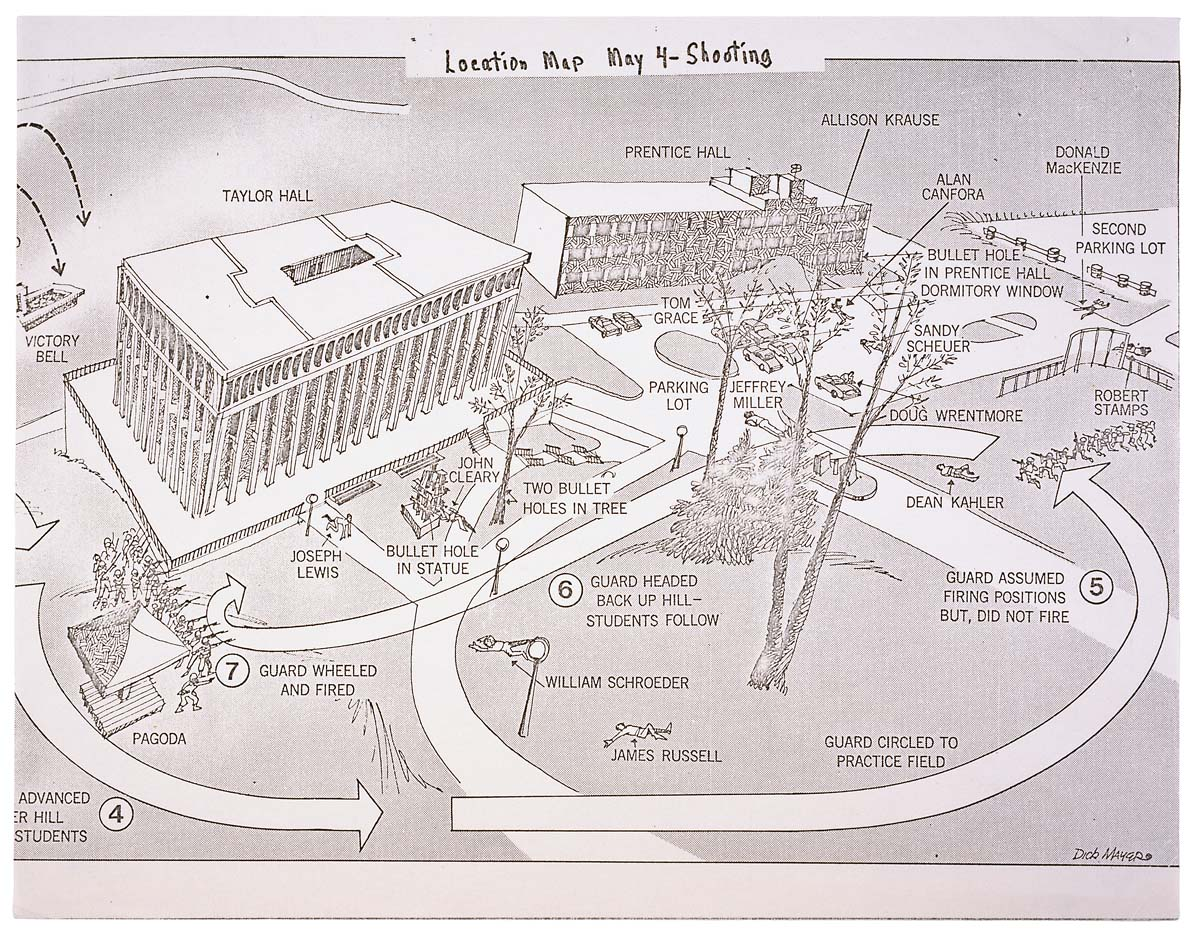
Map of the shootings

== The shootings ==
During their climb back to Blanket Hill, several guardsmen stopped and half-turned to keep their eyes on the students in the Prentice Hall parking lot. At 12:24 pm, according to eyewitnesses, a sergeant named Myron Pryor turned and began firing at the crowd of students with his .45 pistol,though a later forensic investigation revealed that Pryor's weapon was never fired during the incident. Several guardsmen nearest the students also turned and fired their rifles at the students. In all, at least 29 of the 77 guardsmen claimed to have fired their weapons, using an estimated 67 rounds of ammunition. The shooting was determined to have lasted 13 seconds, although John Kifner reported in The New York Times that "it appeared to go on, as a solid volley, for perhaps a full minute or a little longer."

=== Breakdown by weapon type ===
Weapon type	Soldiers firing	Rounds fired
M1 Garand rifles (.30-06 calibre)	25	55 rounds
Colt M1911 pistols (.45 ACP)	2	5 rounds
Riot shotgun (12 gauge)	1	1 shot

When the Guard began firing, many protesters ran while others dropped to the ground. Some assumed the Guard was firing blanks and reacted only after they noticed the bullets striking the ground around them.

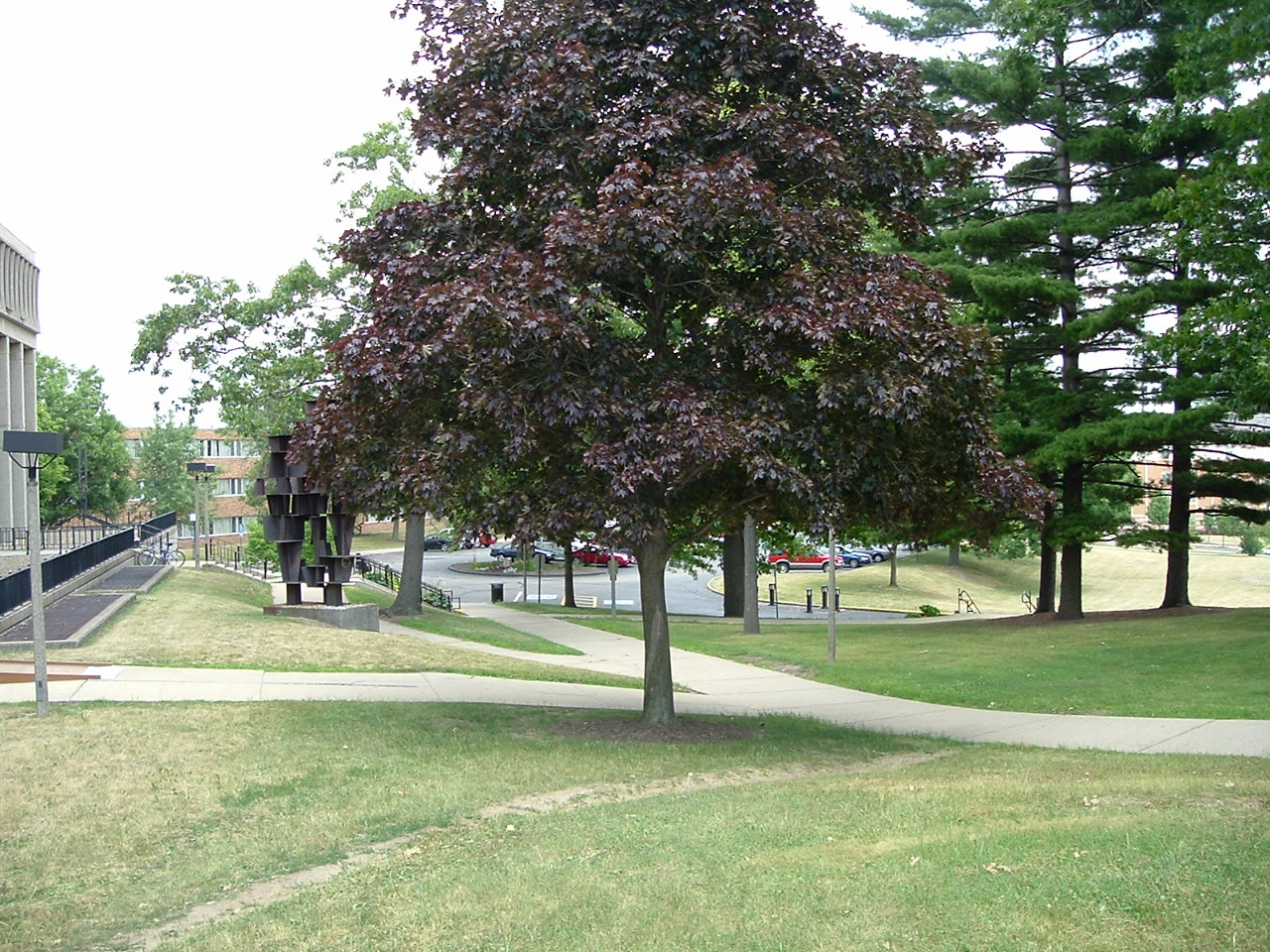
Photo taken from the perspective of where the Ohio National Guard soldiers stood when they opened fire on the students

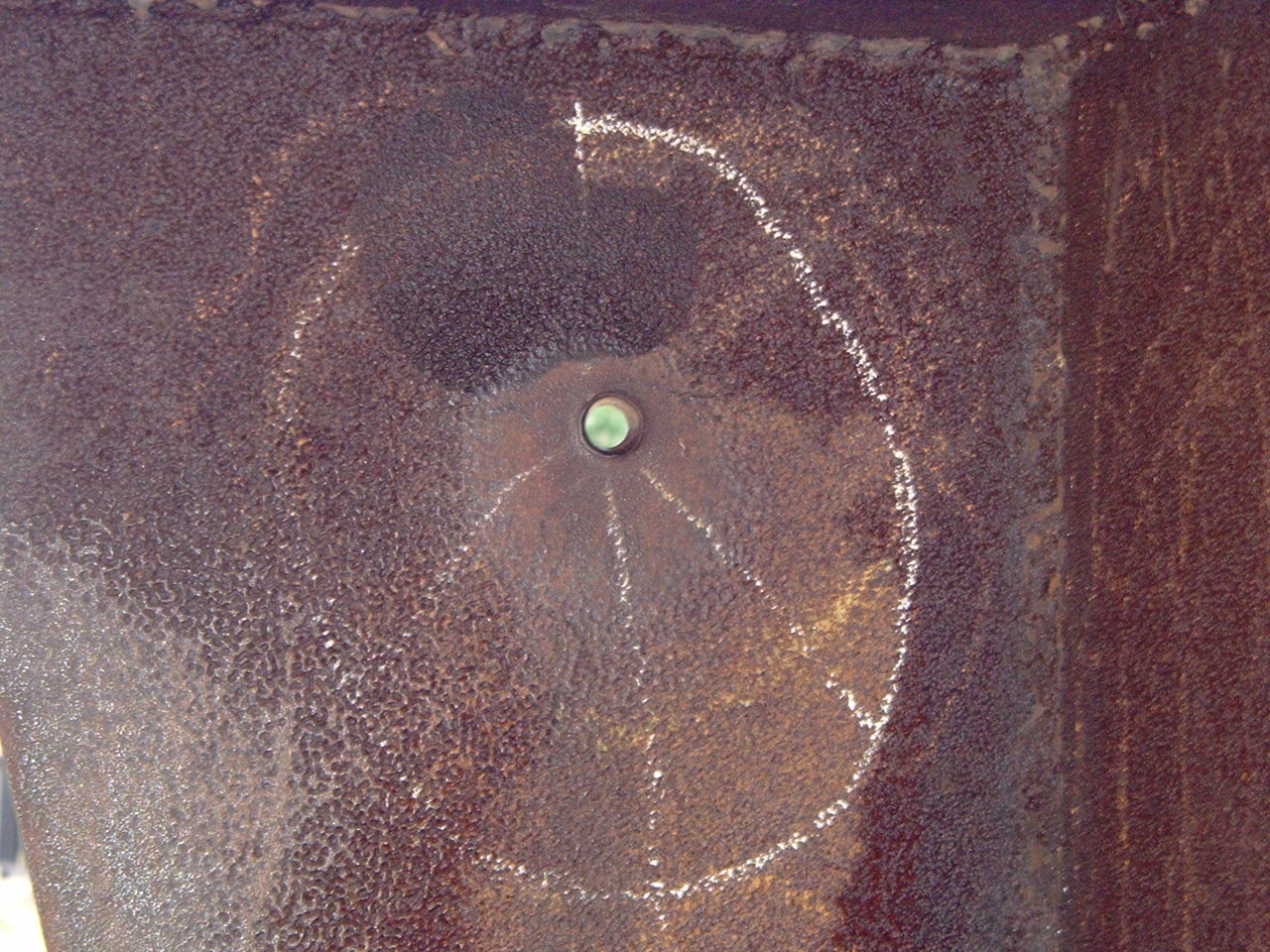
Bullet hole in Solar Totem #1 sculpture by Don Drumm caused by a .30 caliber round fired by the Ohio National Guard at Kent State on May 4, 1970

=== Eyewitness accounts ===
Several present related what they saw.

An unidentified person told UPI:

Suddenly, they turned around, got on their knees, as if they were ordered to, they did it all together, aimed. And personally, I was standing there saying, they're not going to shoot, they can't do that. If they are going to shoot, it's going to be blank.

Chris Butler, who later formed the band The Waitresses, was there with his friend Jeffrey Miller. Butler said that as the guardsmen formed in a kneeling position and pointed their rifles, "Everybody laughed, because, c'mon, you're not going to shoot us."

Another unidentified person told UPI:

The shots were definitely coming my way, because when a bullet passes your head, it makes a crack. I hit the ground behind the curve, looking over. I saw a student hit. He stumbled and fell, to where he was running towards the car. Another student tried to pull him behind the car, bullets were coming through the windows of the car.

As this student fell behind the car, I saw another student go down, next to the curb, on the far side of the automobile, maybe 25 or 30 yards from where I was lying. It was maybe 25, 30, 35 seconds of sporadic firing.

The firing stopped. I lay there maybe 10 or 15 seconds. I got up, I saw four or five students lying around the lot. By this time, it was like mass hysteria. Students were crying, they were screaming for ambulances. I heard some girl screaming, "They didn't have blank, they didn't have blank," no, they didn't.

Another witness was Chrissie Hynde, a Kent State student who would become the lead singer of The Pretenders. In her 2015 autobiography Hynde described what she saw:

Then I heard the tatatatatatatatatat sound. I thought it was fireworks. An eerie sound fell over the common. The quiet felt like gravity pulling us to the ground. Then a young man's voice: "They fucking killed somebody!" Everything slowed down and the silence got heavier.

The ROTC building, now nothing more than a few inches of charcoal, was surrounded by National Guardsmen. They were all on one knee and pointing their rifles at ... us! Then they fired.

By the time I made my way to where I could see them, it was still unclear what was going on. The guardsmen themselves looked stunned. We looked at them and they looked at us. They were just kids, 19 years old, like us. But in uniform. Like our boys in Vietnam.

Gerald Casale, visual artist and future bassist/singer of Devo, also witnessed the shootings. In 2005, Casale told the Vermont Review:

All I can tell you is that it completely and utterly changed my life. I was a white hippie boy and then I saw exit wounds from M1 rifles out of the backs of two people I knew.

Two of the four people who were killed, Jeffrey Miller and Allison Krause, were my friends. We were all running our asses off from these motherfuckers. It was total, utter bullshit. Live ammunition and gasmasks – none of us knew, none of us could have imagined ... They shot into a crowd that was running from them!

I stopped being a hippie and I started to develop the idea of devolution. I got real, real pissed off.

In the paper that evening, the Akron Beacon Journal, said that students were running around armed and that officers had been hurt. So deputy sheriffs went out and deputized citizens. They drove around with shotguns and there was martial law for ten days. 7 pm curfew. It was open season on the students. We lived in fear. Helicopters surrounding the city with hourly rotating runs out to the West Side and back downtown. All first amendment rights are suspended at the instance [sic] when the governor gives the order. All of the class action suits by the parents of the slain students were all dismissed out of court because once the governor announced martial law, they had no right to assemble.

=== Guardsmen's reasons for opening fire ===
Many guardsmen later testified that they fired because they feared for their lives, which was later questioned partly because of the distance between them and the protesting students. Guardsmen that claimed they feared for their lives variously listed an assortment of reasons, including: they were surrounded, the crowd pursuing them was almost on top of them, the protesters "charged" them or were advancing on them "in a threatening manner", "the sky was black with stones", and a sniper fired at them; some listed a combination of multiple such reasons, and some gave no explanation as to why they believed their lives were in danger. Most guardsmen that fired said they did so because they heard others fire or assumed an order to fire in the air had been given and did not claim they felt in danger. There was no order to fire, and no guardsmen requested permission, though several guardsmen later claimed they heard some sort of command to fire. Some guardsmen (including some who claimed their lives were in danger) had their backs turned to the protesters when the firing broke out. No guardsman claimed to have been hit by rocks immediately before firing, and the guardsmen were not surrounded. The FBI determined that at least two guardsmen who denied firing likely lied and had fired and that there was reason to believe that guardsmen's claims of fearing for their lives were fabricated after the event.

The adjutant general of the Ohio National Guard told reporters that a sniper had fired on the guardsmen. Eleven of the 76 guardsmen at Taylor Hall claimed they were under sniper fire or some other sort of gunfire just before guardsmen began shooting. A subsequent FBI investigation concluded that the Guard was not under fire and that the guardsmen fired the first shots.

Time magazine later wrote that "triggers were not pulled accidentally at Kent State". The President's Commission on Campus Unrest avoided probing why the shootings happened. Instead, it harshly criticized both the protesters and the Guardsmen, but it concluded that "the indiscriminate firing of rifles into a crowd of students and the deaths that followed were unnecessary, unwarranted, and inexcusable."

=== Reaction ===
The shooting enraged the crowd of protesting students, with some of them preparing to attack the National Guard. Several hundred students sat down in the Commons, demanding to know why the guardsmen opened fire. An officer told the sitting students: "disperse or we will shoot again". Student photographer John Filo also recalled guardsmen telling lingering students that they would shoot again if the students did not disperse. The commander of the National Guard also warned faculty members that the students must disperse immediately. Some faculty members, led by geology professor and faculty marshal Glenn Frank, pleaded with the students to leave the Commons to avoid any further escalation of the confrontation, with Frank telling the students:

I don't care whether you've never listened to anyone before in your lives. I am begging you right now. If you don't disperse right now, they're going to move in, and it can only be a slaughter. Would you please listen to me? Jesus Christ, I don't want to be a part of this ... !

After Professor Frank's intervention, students left the area, and ambulances moved in to attend to the victims. Frank's son, who was present, said, "He absolutely saved my life and hundreds of others".

== Victims ==
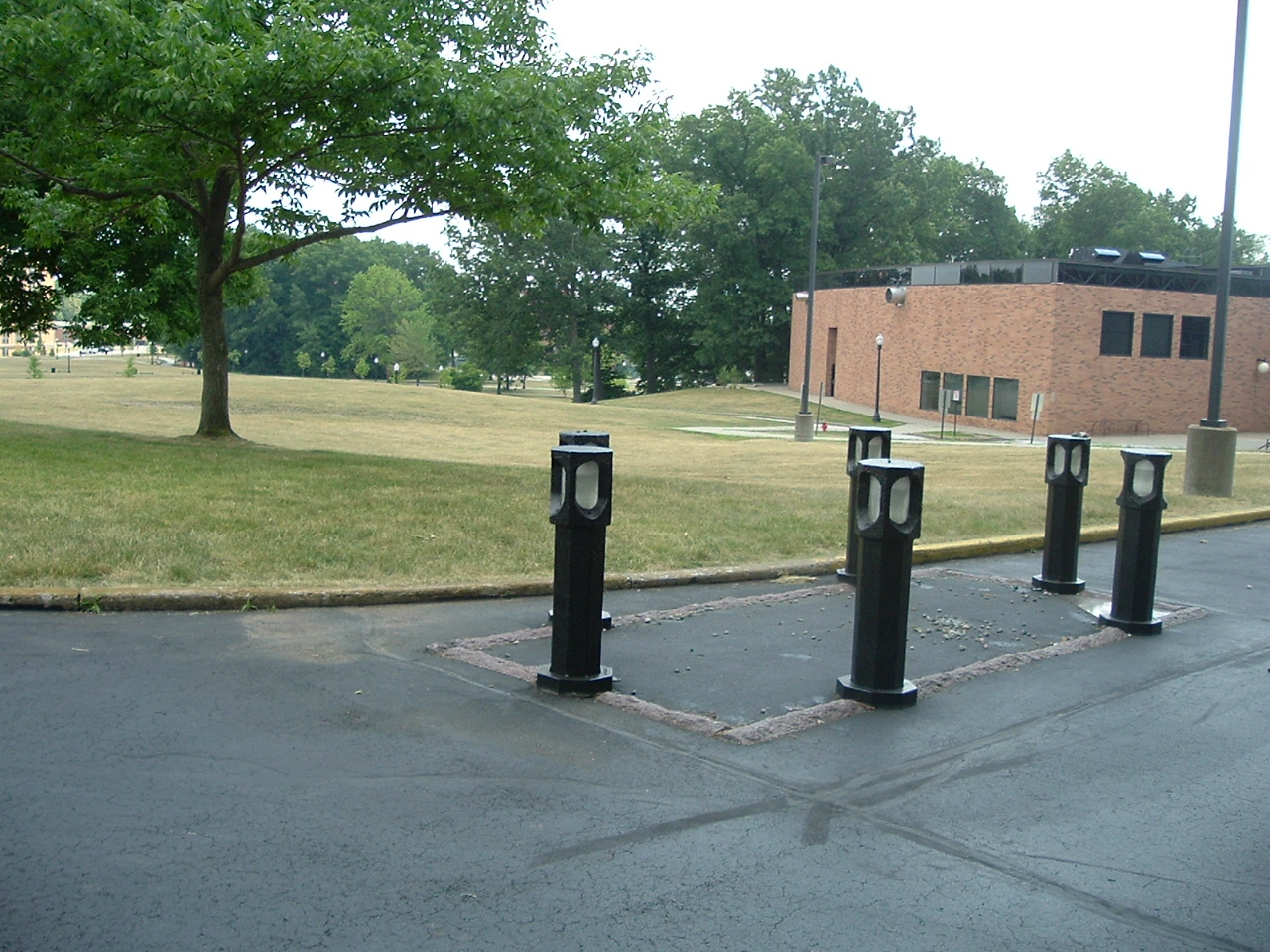
Memorial at the site where student Jeffrey Miller fell, taken in 2007 from approximately the same perspective as John Filo's 1970 photograph

Killed (and approximate distance from the National Guard):

- Jeffrey Glenn Miller; 265 ft (81 m) shot through the mouth; killed instantly.
- Allison Beth Krause; 343 ft (105 m) fatal left chest wound; dead on arrival.
- William Knox Schroeder; 382 ft (116 m) fatal chest wound; died almost an hour later in a local hospital while undergoing surgery. He was a member of the campus ROTC battalion.
- Sandra Lee Scheuer; 390 ft (120 m) fatal neck wound; died a few minutes later from loss of blood.

Wounded (and approximate distance from the National Guard):

- Joseph Lewis Jr.; 71 ft (22 m); hit twice; once in his right abdomen and once in his lower left leg.
- John R. Cleary; 110 ft (34 m); upper left chest wound.
- Thomas Mark Grace; 225 ft (69 m); hit in his left ankle.
- Alan Michael Canfora; 225 ft (69 m); hit in his right wrist.
- Dean R. Kahler; 258 ft (79 m); back wound fracturing the vertebrae; permanently paralyzed from the waist down.
- Douglas Alan Wrentmore; 329 ft (100 m); hit in his right knee.
- James Dennis Russell; 375 ft (114 m); hit in his right thigh from a bullet and grazed on his right forehead by either a bullet or birdshot; both wounds minor (wounded near the Memorial Gymnasium, away from most of the other students).
- Robert Follis Stamps; 495 ft (151 m); hit in his right buttock.
- Donald Scott MacKenzie; 750 ft (230 m); neck wound.

Of those shot, none was closer than 71 feet (22 m) to the guardsmen. Of those killed, the nearest (Miller) was 265 feet (81 m) away, and their average distance from the guardsmen was 345 feet (105 m). The victim furthest from the Guard was 750 feet (230 m) away.

In the President's Commission on Campus Unrest (pp. 273–274) they mistakenly list Thomas V. Grace, who is Thomas Mark Grace's father, as the Thomas Grace injured.

All those shot were students in good standing at the university. Four of the survivors have since died: James Russell on June 23, 2007, Robert Stamps in June 2008, Alan Canfora on December 20, 2020, and John Cleary on October 25, 2025.

Injured National Guard members

Initial newspaper reports had inaccurately stated that several National Guard members had been killed or seriously injured. Though many guardsmen claimed to have been hit by stones that were pelted at them by protesters, only one Guardsman, Sgt. Lawrence Shafer, was injured enough to require medical treatment (he received a sling for his badly bruised arm and was given pain medication) and sustained his injuries approximately 10 to 15 minutes before the shootings. Shafer is mentioned in an FBI memo from November 15, 1973, which was prepared by the Cleveland Office and is referred to by Field Office file # 44-703. It reads as follows:

Upon contacting appropriate officers of the Ohio National Guard at Ravenna and Akron, Ohio, regarding ONG radio logs and the availability of service record books, the respective ONG officer advised that any inquiries concerning the Kent State University incident should be directed to the Adjutant General, ONG, Columbus, Ohio. Three persons were interviewed regarding a reported conversation by Sgt Lawrence Shafer, ONG, that Shafer had bragged about "taking a bead" on Jeffrey Miller at the time of the ONG shooting and each interviewee was unable to substantiate such a conversation.

In an interview broadcast in 1986 on the ABC News documentary series Our World, Shafer identified the person that he fired at as student Joseph Lewis, who was shot and wounded in the attack.

== Aftermath and long-term effects ==
Photographs of the dead and wounded at Kent State, distributed in newspapers and periodicals worldwide, amplified sentiment against the United States' invasion of Cambodia and the Vietnam War. In particular, the camera of Kent State photojournalism student John Filo captured a 14-year-old runaway, Mary Ann Vecchio, screaming over the dead body of Jeffrey Miller, who had been shot in the mouth. The photograph, which won a Pulitzer Prize, became the most enduring image of the events and one of the more enduring images of the anti-Vietnam War movement.

The shootings led to protests on college campuses throughout the United States and a student strike, causing more than 450 campuses across the country to close with both violent and non-violent demonstrations. A common sentiment was expressed by students at New York University with a banner hung out of a window that read, "They Can't Kill Us All." On May 8, eleven people were bayonetted at the University of New Mexico by the New Mexico National Guard in a confrontation with student protesters. Also on May 8, an antiwar protest at New York's Federal Hall National Memorial held at least partly in reaction to the Kent State killings was met with a counter-rally of pro-Nixon construction workers (organized by Peter J. Brennan, later appointed U.S. Labor Secretary by President Nixon), resulting in the Hard Hat riot. Shortly after the shootings, the Urban Institute conducted a national study that concluded the Kent State shooting prompted the first nationwide student strike in U.S. history; over 4 million students protested, and hundreds of American colleges and universities closed during the student strikes. A student strike occurred at Colorado State University in Fort Collins, Colorado and the university's Old Main Building burned down on May 8. The Kent State campus remained closed for six weeks.

Just five days after the shootings, 100,000 people demonstrated in Washington, D.C., against the war and the killing of unarmed student protesters. Ray Price, Nixon's chief speechwriter from 1969 to 1974, recalled the Washington demonstrations saying, "The city was an armed camp. The mobs were smashing windows, slashing tires, dragging parked cars into intersections, even throwing bedsprings off overpasses into the traffic down below. This was the quote, student protest. That's not student protest, that's civil war." Not only was the President taken to Camp David for two days for his own protection, but Charles Colson (Counsel to President Nixon from 1969 to 1973) stated that the military was called up to protect the Nixon Administration from the angry students; he recalled that: "The 82nd Airborne was in the basement of the executive office building, so I went down just to talk to some of the guys and walk among them, and they're lying on the floor leaning on their packs and their helmets and their cartridge belts and their rifles cocked and you're thinking, 'This can't be the United States of America. This is not the greatest free democracy in the world. This is a nation at war with itself.'"

President Nixon and his administration's public reaction to the shootings was perceived by many in the anti-war movement as callous. Then-National Security Advisor Henry Kissinger said the President was "pretending indifference". Stanley Karnow noted in his Vietnam: A History that: "The [Nixon] administration initially reacted to this event with wanton insensitivity. Nixon's press secretary, Ron Ziegler, whose statements were carefully programmed, referred to the deaths as a reminder that 'when dissent turns to violence, it invites tragedy.'" Three days before the shootings, Nixon had talked of "bums" who were anti-war protestors on United States campuses, to which the father of Allison Krause stated on national TV: "My child was not a bum."

Karnow further documented that at 4:15 a.m. on May 9, 1970, the president met about 30 student dissidents conducting a vigil at the Lincoln Memorial, at which point Nixon "treated them to a clumsy and condescending monologue, which he made public in an awkward attempt to display his benevolence." Nixon had been trailed by White House Deputy for Domestic Affairs Egil Krogh, who saw it differently, saying, "I thought it was a very significant and major effort to reach out." Neither side could convince the other, and after meeting with the students, Nixon expressed that those in the anti-war movement were the pawns of foreign communists. After the student protests, Nixon asked H. R. Haldeman to consider the Huston Plan, which would have used illegal procedures to gather information on the leaders of the anti-war movement. Only the resistance of J. Edgar Hoover stopped the plan.

A Gallup poll taken the day after the shootings reportedly showed that 58 percent of respondents blamed the students, 11 percent blamed the National Guard, and 31 percent expressed no opinion. However, there was wide discussion as to whether these were legally justified shootings of American citizens, and whether the protests or the decisions to ban them were constitutional. These debates further galvanized uncommitted opinions through the terms of the discourse. The term "massacre" was applied to the shootings by some individuals and media sources, as it had been used for the Boston Massacre of 1770, in which five were killed and several more wounded.

In a speech at Kent State University to mark the 49th anniversary of the shootings, guest speaker Bob Woodward revealed a 1971 recording of Richard Nixon discussing the Attica Prison riot, in which he compared the uprising to the shootings at Kent State and considered that they might have a "salutary effect" on his administration. Woodward labelled the previously unheard remarks "chilling" and among the "most outrageous" of the President's statements.

Students from Kent State and other universities often received a hostile reaction upon returning home. Some were told that more students should have been killed to teach student protesters a lesson; some students were disowned by their families.

On May 14, ten days after the Kent State shootings, two students were killed (and 12 wounded) by police at Jackson State University, a historically black university, in Jackson, Mississippi, under similar circumstances – the Jackson State killings – but that event did not arouse the same nationwide attention as the Kent State shootings.

On June 13, 1970, as a consequence of the killings of protesting students at Kent State and Jackson State, President Nixon established the President's Commission on Campus Unrest, known as the Scranton Commission, which he charged to study the dissent, disorder, and violence breaking out on college and university campuses across the nation.

The Commission issued its findings in a September 1970 report that concluded that the Ohio National Guard shootings on May 4, 1970, were unjustified. The report said:

Even if the guardsmen faced danger, it was not a danger that called for lethal force. The 61 shots by 28 guardsmen certainly cannot be justified. Apparently, no order to fire was given, and there was inadequate fire control discipline on Blanket Hill. The Kent State tragedy must mark the last time that, as a matter of course, loaded rifles are issued to guardsmen confronting student demonstrators.

=== Legal action ===
In September 1970, twenty-four students and one faculty member, identified from photographs, were indicted on charges connected either with the May 4 demonstration or the one at the ROTC building fire three days before; they became known as the "Kent 25". The Kent Legal Defense Fund was organized to provide legal resources to oppose the indictments. Five cases, all related to the burning of the ROTC building, went to trial: one non-student defendant was convicted on one charge, and two other non-students pleaded guilty. One other defendant was acquitted, and charges were dismissed against the last. In December 1971, all charges against the remaining twenty were dismissed for lack of evidence.

A grand jury indicted five guardsmen on felony charges: Lawrence Shafer, 28, and James McGee, 28, both of Ravenna, Ohio; James Pierce, 30, of Amelia Island, Florida; William Perkins, 38, of Canton, Ohio; and Ralph Zoller, 27, of Mantua, Ohio. Additionally, Barry Morris, 30, of Kent, Ohio; Leon Smith, 27, of Beach City, Ohio; and Matthew McManus, 28, of West Salem, Ohio, were indicted on misdemeanor charges. The guardsmen claimed to have fired in self-defense, testimony that was generally accepted by the criminal justice system.

On November 8, 1974, U.S. District Judge Frank J. Battisti dismissed civil rights charges against all accused because "the government had not shown that the defendants had shot students with an intent to deprive them of specific civil rights." "It is vital that state and National Guard officials not regard this decision as authorizing or approving the use of force against demonstrators, whatever the occasion of the issue involved," Battisti said in his opinion. "Such use of force is, and was, deplorable."

Civil actions were also attempted against the guardsmen, the state of Ohio, and the president of Kent State. The federal court civil action for wrongful death and injury, brought by the victims and their families against Ohio Governor Rhodes, the president of Kent State, and the National Guardsmen, resulted in unanimous verdicts for all defendants on all claims after an eleven-week trial. The judgment on those verdicts was reversed by the Court of Appeals for the Sixth Circuit on the ground that the federal trial judge had mishandled an out-of-court threat against a juror. On remand, the civil case was settled in return for payment of a total of $675,000 to all plaintiffs by the state of Ohio (explained by the State as the estimated cost of defense) and the defendants' agreement to state publicly that they regretted what had happened:

In retrospect, the tragedy of May 4, 1970, should not have occurred. The students may have believed that they were right in continuing their mass protest in response to the Cambodian invasion, even though this protest followed the posting and reading by the university of an order to ban rallies and an order to disperse. These orders have since been determined by the Sixth Circuit Court of Appeals to have been lawful.

Some of the Guardsmen on Blanket Hill, fearful and anxious from prior events, may have believed in their own minds that their lives were in danger. Hindsight suggests that another method would have resolved the confrontation. Better ways must be found to deal with such a confrontation.

We devoutly wish that a means had been found to avoid the May 4th events culminating in the Guard shootings and the irreversible deaths and injuries. We deeply regret those events and are profoundly saddened by the deaths of four students and the wounding of nine others which resulted. We hope that the agreement to end the litigation will help to assuage the tragic memories regarding that sad day.

In the succeeding years, many in the anti-war movement have referred to the shootings as "murders", although no criminal convictions were obtained against any National Guardsman. In December 1970, journalist I. F. Stone wrote:

To those who think murder is too strong a word, one may recall that even [Vice President Spiro] Agnew three days after the Kent State shootings used the word in an interview on the David Frost show in Los Angeles. Agnew admitted in response to a question that what happened at Kent State was murder, "but not first degree" since there was – as Agnew explained from his own training as a lawyer – "no premeditation but simply an over-response in the heat of anger that results in a killing; it's a murder. It's not premeditated and it certainly can't be condoned."

The Kent State incident forced the National Guard to re-examine its crowd control methods. The only equipment the guardsmen had to disperse demonstrators that day were M1 Garand rifles loaded with .30-06 FMJ ammunition, 12 Ga. pump shotguns, bayonets, and CS gas grenades. In the years that followed, U.S. military and National Guard personnel began using less lethal means to disperse demonstrators (such as rubber bullets) and changed its crowd control and riot tactics to attempt to avoid casualties. Many of these tactics have been used by police and military forces in the United States when facing similar situations over the decades, such as the 1992 Los Angeles riots and the civil disorder incited by Hurricane Katrina in 2005.

One outgrowth of the events was the Center for Peaceful Change, established at Kent State University in 1971 "as a living memorial to the events of May 4, 1970". Now known as The Center for Applied Conflict Management (CACM), it developed one of the earliest conflict resolution undergraduate degree programs in the United States. The Institute for the Study and Prevention of Violence, an interdisciplinary program dedicated to violence prevention, was established in 1998.

According to FBI reports, one part-time student, Terry Norman, was already noted by student protesters as an informant for both campus police and the Akron FBI branch. Norman was present during the May 4 protests, taking photographs to identify student leaders, while carrying a sidearm and wearing a gas mask.

In 1970, FBI director J. Edgar Hoover responded to questions from then-Congressman John M. Ashbrook by denying that Norman had ever worked for the FBI, a statement Norman disputed. On August 13, 1973, Indiana Senator Birch Bayh sent a memo to then-governor of Ohio John J. Gilligan suggesting that Norman may have fired the first shot, based on testimony Bayh received from guardsmen who claimed that a gunshot fired from the vicinity of the protesters instigated the Guard to open fire on the students.

Throughout the years since the shootings, the debate has continued about the events of May 4, 1970.

=== Strubbe Tape and further government reviews ===
In 2007 Alan Canfora, one of the wounded students, located a static-filled copy of an audio tape of the shootings in a Yale library archive. The original 30-minute reel-to-reel audio tape recording was made by Terry Strubbe, a Kent State communications student who turned on his recorder and put its microphone in his dormitory window overlooking the campus. At that time, Canfora asserted that an amplified version of the tape reveals the order to shoot, "Right here! Get Set! Point! Fire!". The tape was declared to have been recording for 10 minutes prior to the sound of the first shot, with the entire sequence of shots lasting 12.53 seconds. Lawrence Shafer, a guardsman who admitted he fired during the shootings and was one of those indicted in the 1974 federal criminal action with charges subsequently dismissed, told the Kent-Ravenna Record-Courier newspaper in May 2007: "I never heard any command to fire. That's all I can say on that." Referring to the assertion that the tape reveals the order, Shafer went on to say, "That's not to say there may not have been, but with all the racket and noise, I don't know how anyone could have heard anything that day." Shafer also said that "point" would not have been part of a proper command to open fire.

A 2010 audio analysis of the Strubbe tape by Stuart Allen and Tom Owen, who were described by the Cleveland Plain Dealer as "nationally respected forensic audio experts", concluded that the guardsmen were given an order to fire. It is the only known recording to capture the events leading up to the shootings. According to the Plain Dealer description of the enhanced recording, a male voice yells, "Guard!" Several seconds pass. Then, "All right, prepare to fire!" "Get down!", someone shouts urgently, presumably in the crowd. Finally, "Guard! ..." followed two seconds later by a long, booming volley of gunshots. The entire spoken sequence lasts 17 seconds. Further analysis of the audiotape revealed that what sounded like four pistol shots and a confrontation occurred approximately 70 seconds before the National Guard opened fire. According to The Plain Dealer, this new analysis raised questions about the role of Terry Norman, a Kent State student who was an FBI informant and known to be carrying a pistol during the disturbance. Alan Canfora said it was premature to reach any conclusions.

In April 2012, the United States Department of Justice determined that there were "insurmountable legal and evidentiary barriers" to reopening the case. Also in 2012, the FBI concluded the Strubbe tape was inconclusive because what has been described as pistol shots may have been slamming doors, and that voices heard were unintelligible. Despite this, organizations of survivors and current Kent State students continue to believe the Strubbe tape proves the Guardsmen were given a military order to fire and are petitioning State of Ohio and United States government officials to reopen the case using independent analysis. The organizations do not desire to prosecute or sue individual guardsmen, believing they are also victims.

One of these groups, the Kent State Truth Tribunal, was founded in 2010 by the family of Allison Krause, along with Emily Kunstler, to demand accountability by the United States government for the massacre. In 2014, KSTT announced their request for an independent review by the United Nations Human Rights Committee under the International Covenant on Civil and Political Rights, the human rights treaty ratified by the United States.

== Memorials and remembrances ==
In January 1970, only months before the shootings, a work of land art, Partially Buried Woodshed, was produced on the Kent State campus by Robert Smithson. Shortly after the events, an inscription was added that recontextualized the work in such a way that some people associate it with the event.

Each May 4 from 1971 to 1975, the Kent State University administration sponsored an official commemoration of the shootings. Upon the university's announcement in 1976 that it would no longer sponsor such commemorations, a group of students and community members formed the May 4 Task Force for this purpose. The group has organized a commemoration on the university's campus each year since 1976; events generally include a silent march around the campus, a candlelight vigil, a ringing of the Victory Bell in memory of those killed and injured, speakers (always including eyewitnesses and family members), and music.

On May 12, 1977, a tent city was erected and maintained for more than 60 days by several dozen protesters on the Kent State campus. The protesters, led by the May 4 Task Force but also including community members and local clergy, were attempting to prevent the university from erecting a gymnasium annex on the part of the site where the shootings had occurred seven years earlier, which they believed would obscure the historical event. Law enforcement finally brought the tent city to an end on July 12, 1977, after the forced removal and arrest of 193 people. The event gained national press coverage, and the issue was taken to the U.S. Supreme Court.

In 1978, American artist George Segal was commissioned by the Mildred Andrews Fund of Cleveland, in agreement with the university, to create a bronze sculpture in commemoration of the shootings, but before its completion, the sculpture was refused by the university administration, who deemed its subject matter (the biblical Abraham poised to sacrifice his son Isaac) too controversial. Segal's completed cast-from-life bronze sculpture, Abraham and Isaac: In Memory of May 4, 1970, Kent State, was instead accepted in 1979 by Princeton University and currently resides there between the university chapel and library.

In 1990, twenty years after the shootings, a memorial commemorating the events of May 4 was dedicated on the campus on a 2.5-acre (1.0 ha) site overlooking the university's Commons where the student protest took place. Even the construction of the monument became controversial and, in the end, only 7% of the design was constructed. The memorial does not contain the names of those killed or wounded in the shooting; under pressure, the university agreed to install a plaque near it with the names.

External videos
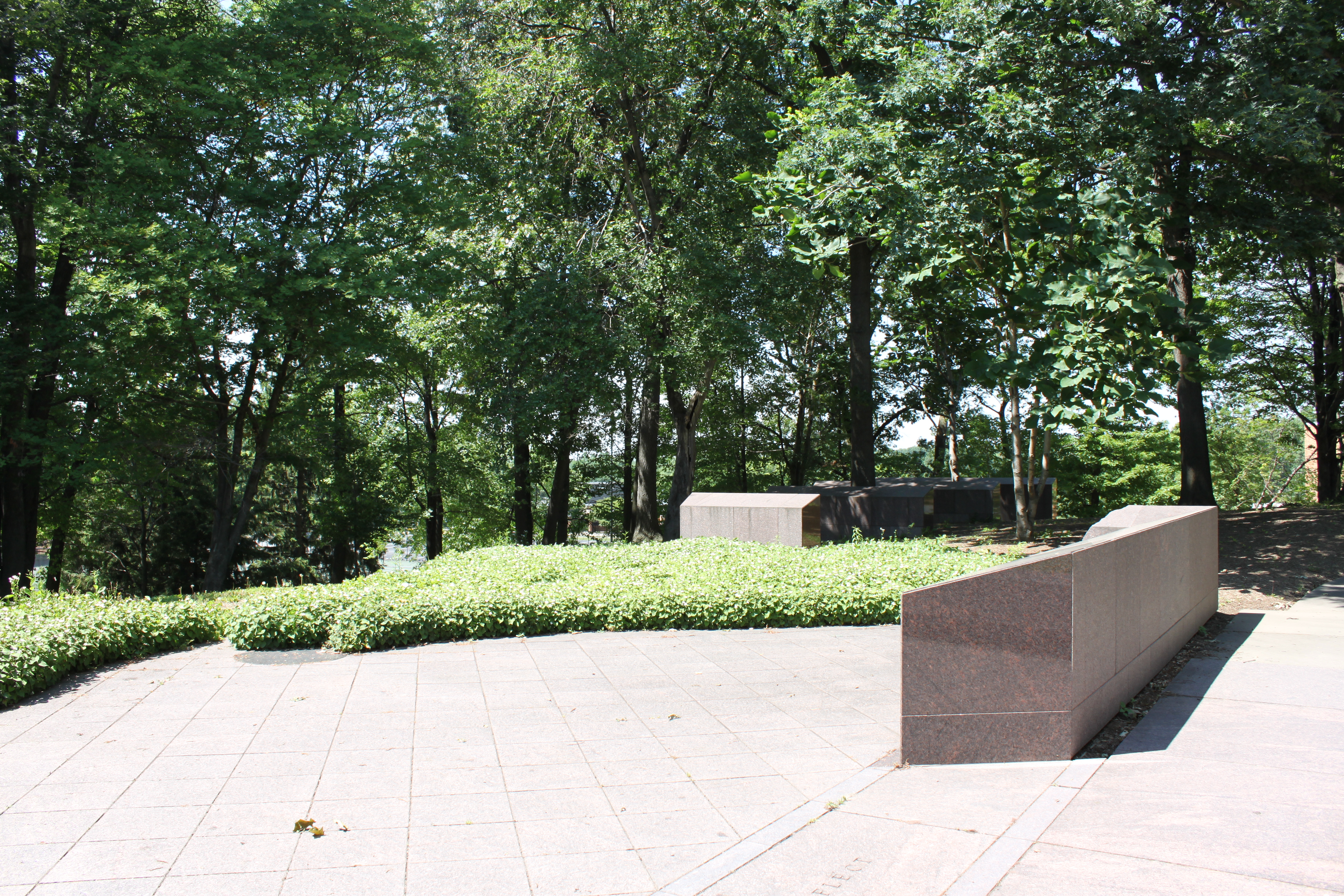
- May 4, 1970 Site Makes National Register of Historic Places, (1:46), Kent State TV

In 1999, at the urging of relatives of the four students killed in 1970, the university constructed an individual memorial for each student in the parking lot between Taylor and Prentice halls. Each of the four memorials is located on the exact spot where the student fell, mortally wounded. They are surrounded by a raised rectangle of granite featuring six lightposts approximately four feet high, with each student's name engraved on a triangular marble plaque in one corner.

In 2004, a simple stone memorial was erected at Plainview-Old Bethpage John F. Kennedy High School in Plainview, New York, which Jeffrey Miller had attended.

On May 3, 2007, just before the yearly commemoration, KSU president Lester Lefton dedicated an Ohio Historical Society marker. It is located between Taylor Hall and Prentice Hall between the parking lot and the 1990 memorial. Also in 2007, a memorial service was held at Kent State in honor of James Russell, one of the wounded, who died in 2007 of a heart attack.

Front side of Ohio Historical Marker #67-8:

Kent State University: May 4, 1970 In 1968, Richard Nixon won the presidency partly based on a campaign promise to end the Vietnam War. Though the war seemed to be winding down, on April 30, 1970, Nixon announced the invasion of Cambodia, triggering protests across college campuses. On Friday, May 1, an anti-war rally was held on the Commons at Kent State University. Protestors called for another rally to be held on Monday, May 4. Disturbances in downtown Kent that night caused city officials to ask Governor James Rhodes to send the Ohio National Guard to maintain order. Troops put on alert Saturday afternoon were called to campus Saturday evening after an ROTC building was set on fire. Sunday morning in a press conference that was also broadcast to the troops on campus, Rhodes vowed to "eradicate the problem" of protests at Kent State.

Back side of Ohio Historical Marker #67-8:

Kent State University: May 4, 1970 On May 4, 1970, Kent State students protested on the Commons against the U.S. invasion of Cambodia and the presence of the Ohio National Guard called to campus to quell demonstrations. Guardsman advanced, driving students past Taylor Hall. A small group of protesters taunted the Guard from the Prentice Hall parking lot. The Guard marched back to the Pagoda, where members of Company A, 145th Infantry, and Troop G, 107th Armored Cavalry, turned and fired 61–67 shots during thirteen seconds. Four students were killed: Allison Krause, Jeffrey Miller, Sandra Scheuer, and William Schroeder. Nine students were wounded: Alan Canfora, John Cleary, Thomas Grace, Dean Kahler, Joseph Lewis, D. Scott MacKenzie, James Russell, Robert Stamps, and Douglas Wrentmore. Those shot were 20 to 245 yards away from the Guard. The Report of the President's Commission on Campus Unrest concluded that the shootings were "unnecessary, unwarranted, and inexcusable."

In 2008, Kent State University announced plans to construct a May 4 Visitors' Center in a room in Taylor Hall. The center was officially opened in May 2013, on the anniversary of the shootings.

A 17.24-acre (6.98 ha) area was listed as "Kent State Shootings Site" on the National Register of Historic Places on February 23, 2010. Places normally cannot be added to the Register until they have been significant for at least fifty years, and only cases of "exceptional importance" can be added sooner. The entry was announced as the featured listing in the National Park Service's weekly list of March 5, 2010. Contributing resources in the site are: Taylor Hall, the Victory Bell, Lilac Lane and Boulder Marker, The Pagoda, Solar Totem, and the Prentice Hall Parking Lot. The National Park Service stated the site "is considered nationally significant given its broad effects in causing the largest student strike in United States history, affecting public opinion about the Vietnam War, creating a legal precedent established by the trials subsequent to the shootings, and for the symbolic status the event has attained as a result of a government confronting protesting citizens with unreasonable deadly force."

Every year on the anniversary of the shootings, notably on the 40th anniversary in 2010, students and others who were present share remembrances of the day and its impact on their lives. Among them are Nick Saban, who was a freshman in 1970 and later won seven college football National Championships as the head coach of the LSU Tigers and Alabama Crimson Tide football teams; surviving student Tom Grace, who was shot in the foot; Kent State faculty member Jerry Lewis (died 2026); and photographer John Filo.

In 2016, the site of the shootings was named as a National Historic Landmark.

In September 2016, Kent State University Libraries Department of Special Collections and Archives began a project, sponsored by a grant from the National Archives' National Historical Publications and Records Commission, to digitize materials related to the actions and reactions surrounding the shootings.

== In popular culture ==
=== Documentaries ===
- 1970: Confrontation at Kent State (dir. Richard Myers) – documentary filmed by a Kent State University filmmaker in Kent, Ohio, directly following the shootings.
- 1971: Allison (dir. Richard Myers) – a tribute to Allison Krause.
- 1971: Part of the Family (dir. Paul Ronder) – one of the three segments profiles the family of Allison Krause.
- 1979: George Segal (dir. Michael Blackwood) – documentary about American sculptor George Segal; Segal discusses and is shown creating his bronze sculpture Abraham and Isaac, which was initially intended as a memorial for the Kent State University campus.
- 2000: Kent State: The Day the War Came Home (dir. Chris Triffo, executive producer Mark Mori), the Emmy Award-winning documentary featuring interviews with injured students, eyewitnesses, guardsmen, and relatives of students killed at Kent State.
- 2007: Vier Tote in Ohio: Ein Amerikanisches Trauma ("4 dead in Ohio: an American trauma") (dir. Klaus Bredenbrock and Pagonis Pagonakis) – documentary featuring interviews with injured students, eyewitnesses and a German journalist who was a U.S. correspondent.
- 2008: How It Was: Kent State Shootings – National Geographic Channel documentary series episode.
- 2015: The Day the '60s Died (dir. Jonathan Halperin) – PBS documentary featuring build-up of events at KSU, archival photos, and film, as well as eyewitness reminiscences of the event.
- 2017: The Vietnam War: The History of the World (April 1969 – May 1970) Episode 8 (dir Ken Burns and Lynn Novick) – PBS documentary series featuring build-up of events at KSU, archival photos and film as well as eyewitness reminiscences of the event.
- 2020: Fire in the Heartland: Kent State, May 4, and Student Protest in America – documentary featuring the build-up to, the events of, and the aftermath of the shootings, told by many of those who were present and in some cases wounded.
- 2026: Out of Obscurity, Into Oblivion: A Film About The Numbers Band (dir. Jason Prufer, 2026) – contains numerous detailed eyewitness accounts of the shootings and explains the influence the incident had on area musicians

=== Film and television ===
- 1970: The Bold Ones: The Senator – A television program starring Hal Holbrook, aired a two-part episode titled "A Continual Roar of Musketry" which was based on a Kent-State-like shooting. Holbrook's Senator character is investigating the incident.
- 1974: The Trial of Billy Jack – The climactic scene of this film depicts National Guardsmen lethally firing on unarmed students, and the credits specifically mention Kent State and other student shootings.
- 1981: Kent State (directed by James Goldstone) – television docudrama.
- 1995: Nixon – directed by Oliver Stone, the film features actual footage of the shootings; the event also plays an important role in the course of the film's narrative.
- 2000: The '70s, starring Vinessa Shaw and Amy Smart, a mini-series depicting four Kent State students affected by the shootings as they move through the decade.
- 2002: The Year That Trembled (written and directed by Jay Craven; based on a novel by Scott Lax), a coming-of-age movie set in 1970 Ohio, in the aftermath of the Kent State killings.
- 2009: Watchmen (directed by Zack Snyder) – Depicts a reenacted scene of the shooting in the few opening moments of the film.
- 2013: "Freedom Deal: The Story of Lucky" (directed by Jason Rosette (as 'Jack RO') – Cambodia-made film dramatizing the US & ARVN incursion into Cambodia on May 4, 1970, as told from the perspective of two refugees fleeing the conflict. Includes US Army radio references to the Kent State protests, with accompanying archival footage.
- 2017: The Vietnam War (TV series), episode 8 "The History of the World" (April 1969 – May 1970), directed by Ken Burns and Lynn Novick. Includes a short segment on the background, events, and effects of the Kent State shootings, using film footage and photographs taken at the time.

=== Literature ===
==== Plays ====
- 1976: Kent State: A Requiem by J. Gregory Payne. First performed in 1976. Told from the perspective of Bill Schroeder's mother, Florence, this play has been performed at over 150 college campuses in the U.S. and Europe in tours in the 1970s, 1980s, and 1990s; it was last performed at Emerson College in 2007. It is also the basis of NBC's award-winning 1981 docudrama Kent State.
- 1993: Blanket Hill explores conversations of the National Guardsmen hours before arriving at Kent State University, activities of students already on campus, the moment they meet face to face on May 4, 1970, framed in the trial four years later. The play originated as a classroom assignment, initially performed at the Pan-African Theater and developed at the Organic Theater, Chicago. The play was later produced as part of the Kent State University Department of Theatre and Dance Student Theatre Festival in 2010, and performed as part of the 40th May 4 Commemoration that year. The play was written and directed by Kay Cosgriff. A DVD of the production is available for viewing from the May 4 Collection at Kent State University.
- 1995: Nightwalking. Voices From Kent State by Sandra Perlman, first presented in Chicago on April 20, 1995, directed by Jenifer (Gwenne) Weber.
- 1995: Kent State is referenced in Nikki Giovanni's "The Beep Beep Poem".
- 2010: David Hassler, director of the Wick Poetry Center at Kent State, and theater professor Katherine Burke teamed up to write the play May 4 Voices, in honor of the incident's 40th anniversary.
- 2012: 4 Dead in Ohio: Antigone at Kent State, created by students of Connecticut College's theatre department and David Jaffe, associate professor of theater and the director of the play. An adaptation of Sophocles' Antigone using the play Burial at Thebes by Nobel Laureate Seamus Heaney, it was performed November 15–18, 2012, in the college's Tansill Theater.

==== Prose ====
- Harlan Ellison's story collection, Alone Against Tomorrow (1971), is dedicated to the four students who were killed. An essay in his Los Angeles Free Press column The Other Glass Teat dated May 15, 1970, discusses the events and his reaction to them. He describes television interviews with Brigadier General Robert Canterbury (without naming him), who commanded the guard that day, and the student strikes in response to the murders.
- Lesley Choyce's novel, The Republic of Nothing (1994), mentions how one character hates President Richard Nixon due in part to the students of Kent State.
- Gael Baudino's Dragonsword trilogy (1988–1992) follows the story of a teaching assistant who narrowly missed being shot in the massacre. Frequent references are made to how the experience and its aftermath still traumatize the protagonist decades later when she is a soldier.
- Stephen King's 1978 post-apocalyptic novel The Stand includes a scene in Book I in which Kent State campus police officers witness U.S. soldiers shooting students protesting the government cover-up of the military origins of the Superflu that is devastating the country.

==== Graphic novels ====
- Issue No. 57 of Warren Ellis and Darick Robertson's comic book Transmetropolitan contains an homage to the Kent State shootings and John Filo's photograph of Mary Ann Vecchio.
- Derf Backderf's 2020 graphic novel, Kent State: Four Dead in Ohio depicts the events and the circumstances leading to them in detail.

==== Poetry ====
- The incident is mentioned in Allen Ginsberg's 1975 poem Hadda be Playin' on a Jukebox.
- The poem "Bullets and Flowers" by Yevgeny Yevtushenko is dedicated to Allison Krause. Krause had participated in the previous days' protest during which she reportedly put a flower in the barrel of a Guardsman's rifle, as had been done at a war protest at The Pentagon in October 1967, and reportedly saying, "Flowers are better than bullets."
- Peter Makuck's poem "The Commons" is about the shootings. Makuck, a 1971 graduate of Kent State, was present on the Commons during the incident.
- Gary Geddes' poem "Sandra Lee Scheuer" remembers one of the victims of the Kent State shootings.
- Deborah Wiles' book Kent State (2020) provides a multi-perspective view of the Kent State shootings.

=== Music ===
More than 80 songs have been identified by the Vietnam War Song Project as being about the Kent State shooting. According to research collected by Justin Brummer, the best-known popular culture response to the deaths was the protest song "Ohio", written by Neil Young for Crosby, Stills, Nash & Young (CSN&Y). They promptly recorded the song, and preview discs (acetates) were rushed to major radio stations, even though the group already had a hit song, "Teach Your Children", on the charts at the time. Within two and a half weeks of the shootings, "Ohio" was receiving national airplay. The B-side of the single release was Stephen Stills' anti-Vietnam War anthem, "Find the Cost of Freedom".

David Crosby, Stephen Stills and Graham Nash visited the Kent State campus for the first time on May 4, 1997, twenty-seven years after the shootings, to perform the song for the May 4 Task Force's annual commemoration.

Brummer's research also noted that an obscure garage rock band, Third Condition from Daytona Beach, Florida, released a single, "Monday in May (The Kent State Tragedy)", at around the same time as "Ohio". The original promo pressing was marked "rush release" and "10 June 1970", possibly indicating that it was released before the CSN&Y single.

There are many lesser-known musical tributes, including:

- John Denver wrote the song "Sail Away Home" in response to the shootings. When he introduced the song at the 1970 Philadelphia Folk Festival, he told the audience he wrote the song two days after the event. The song appeared on his 1970 album Whose Garden Was This.
- Paul Kantner and Grace Slick wrote the song "Diana", which appears on their 1971 album Sunfighter. This song also appears on the bonus tracks version of the Jefferson Airplane album Thirty Seconds Over Winterland as an introduction to the song "Volunteers". Part 1 of the song was written in response to the story of Weather Underground member Diana Oughton, and part 2 is a response to the Kent State shootings.
- Harvey Andrews' 1970 song "Hey Sandy" was addressed to Sandra Scheuer.^{lyrics}
- Steve Miller's "Jackson-Kent Blues", from the Steve Miller Band album Number 5 (released in November 1970), is another direct response.
- The Beach Boys released "Student Demonstration Time" in 1971 on Surf's Up. Mike Love wrote new lyrics for Leiber & Stoller's "Riot in Cell Block Number Nine", referencing the Kent State shootings along with other incidents such as Bloody Thursday and the Jackson State killings.
- Bruce Springsteen wrote a song called "Where Was Jesus in Ohio" in May or June 1970 in response to the Kent State shootings.
- Former Yes frontman Jon Anderson has said that the lyrics of "Long Distance Runaround" (from the album Fragile, released in 1971) are also in part about the shootings, particularly the line "hot colour melting the anger to stone."
- Pete Atkin and Clive James wrote "Driving Through Mythical America", recorded by Atkin on his 1971 album of the same name, about the shootings, relating them to a series of events and images from 20th-century American history.
- In 1970–1971 Halim El-Dabh, a Kent State University music professor on campus when the shootings occurred, composed Opera Flies, a full-length opera, in response to his experience. The work was first performed on the Kent State campus on May 8, 1971; it was revived for the 25th commemoration of the events in 1995.
- In 1971, the BBC commissioned George Newson's Arena, a sociopolitical piece of contemporary music theatre climaxing in the Kent State shootings (conductor, Boulez; singer, Cleo Laine). The piece is said to be one of the most important of its time in Britain.
- Actress and singer Ruth Warrick released in 1971 a single with the song "41,000 Plus 4 – The Ballad of the Kent State", an homage to the four students killed at Kent State.
- Dave Brubeck's 1971 cantata Truth Is Fallen was written in response to the slain students at Kent State University and Jackson State University; the work was premiered in Midland, Michigan, on May 1, 1971, and released on LP in 1972.
- The Isley Brothers' antiwar medley "Ohio/Machine Gun" was included on their 1971 album Givin' It Back. Both parts of the medley are covers, with "Ohio" being the aforementioned Crosby, Stills, Nash & Young song, and "Machine Gun" being a Jimi Hendrix song.
- The All Saved Freak Band dedicated its 1973 album My Poor Generation to "Tom Miller of the Kent State 25". Tom Miller was a member of the band who had been featured in Life magazine as part of the Kent State protests and lost his life the following year in an automobile accident.
- Holly Near's "It Could Have Been Me" was released on A Live Album (1974). The song is Near's response to the incident.
- The industrial band Skinny Puppy's 1989 song "Tin Omen" on the album Rabies refers to the event.
- Lamb of God's song "O.D.H.G.A.B.F.E." on the 2000 album New American Gospel, references Kent State, together with the Auschwitz concentration camp, the 1989 Tiananmen Square protests and massacre, the 1968 Democratic National Convention and the Waco Siege.
- Magpie covered the topic in their 1995 album, Give Light. The song "Kent" was written by band member Terry Leonino, a survivor of the Kent State shootings.
- Genesis recreates the events from the perspective of the Guards in the song "The Knife", on Trespass (October 1970). Against a backdrop of voices chanting, "We are only wanting freedom", a male voice in the foreground calls, "Things are getting out of control here today", then "OK men, fire over their heads!" followed by gunshots, screaming and crying.
- Barbara Dane sings "The Kent State Massacre" written by Jack Warshaw on her 1973 album I Hate the Capitalist System.

=== Photography ===
- In her 1996 still/moving photographic project Partially Buried in three parts, visual artist Renée Green aims to address the history of the shootings both historically and culturally.

Famous persons

- Famous persons enrolled at Kent State and/or present at Kent State during the shootings includes Eagles guitarist Joe Walsh, Chrissie Hynde of The Pretenders, Devo members Gerald Casale, Bob Lewis and Mark Mothersbaugh, football coach Nick Saban, football coach and CFL player Jim Corrigall, NFL player Don Nottingham, actor John de Lancie, professor/historian Ken Hammond, novelist Stephen R. Donaldson, and professor/author Michael Gunter.

=== Other references and impacts ===
- In September 2013, a Louisiana State University fraternity hung a sign outside of their house with the text, "Getting Massacred Is Nothing New to Kent St.", after a football game. Delta Kappa Epsilon later issued an apology.
- In September 2014, Urban Outfitters was criticized by media and social media for the release of a faux vintage Kent State University sweatshirt. The sweatshirt had a red and white vintage wash finish but also included what looked like bullet holes and blood splatter patterns.
- On September 1, 2023, vice president and director of athletics, at the University of Central Florida (UCF), Terry Mohajir, apologized to Kent State director of athletics, Randale L. Richmond for a social media post following the UCF Knights, 56-6 football victory over the Kent State Golden Flashes on August 1, 2023, in which the UCF Athletics account posted the phrase, "Someone call the National Guard." The post was reportedly intended as a reference to an NFL sideline video clip from 1996 of Shannon Sharpe of the Denver Broncos pretending to phone the president of the United States during the Broncos 34–8 victory over the New England Patriots and telling him, "...we need the National Guard….call the dogs off, send the National Guard."

== See also ==
- Jackson State killings – Police killings of students (1970)
- List of incidents of civil unrest in the United States
- List of massacres in the United States
- List of National Historic Landmarks in Ohio
- List of school shootings in the United States by death toll
- Ludlow massacre – April 1914 massacre during the Colorado Coalfield War
- Orangeburg massacre – 1968 shooting of student protesters
- University of New Mexico bayoneting incident – 1970 violent incident

== Bibliography ==
The bibliography includes external links.
