= University of New Mexico bayoneting incident =

1970 violent incident

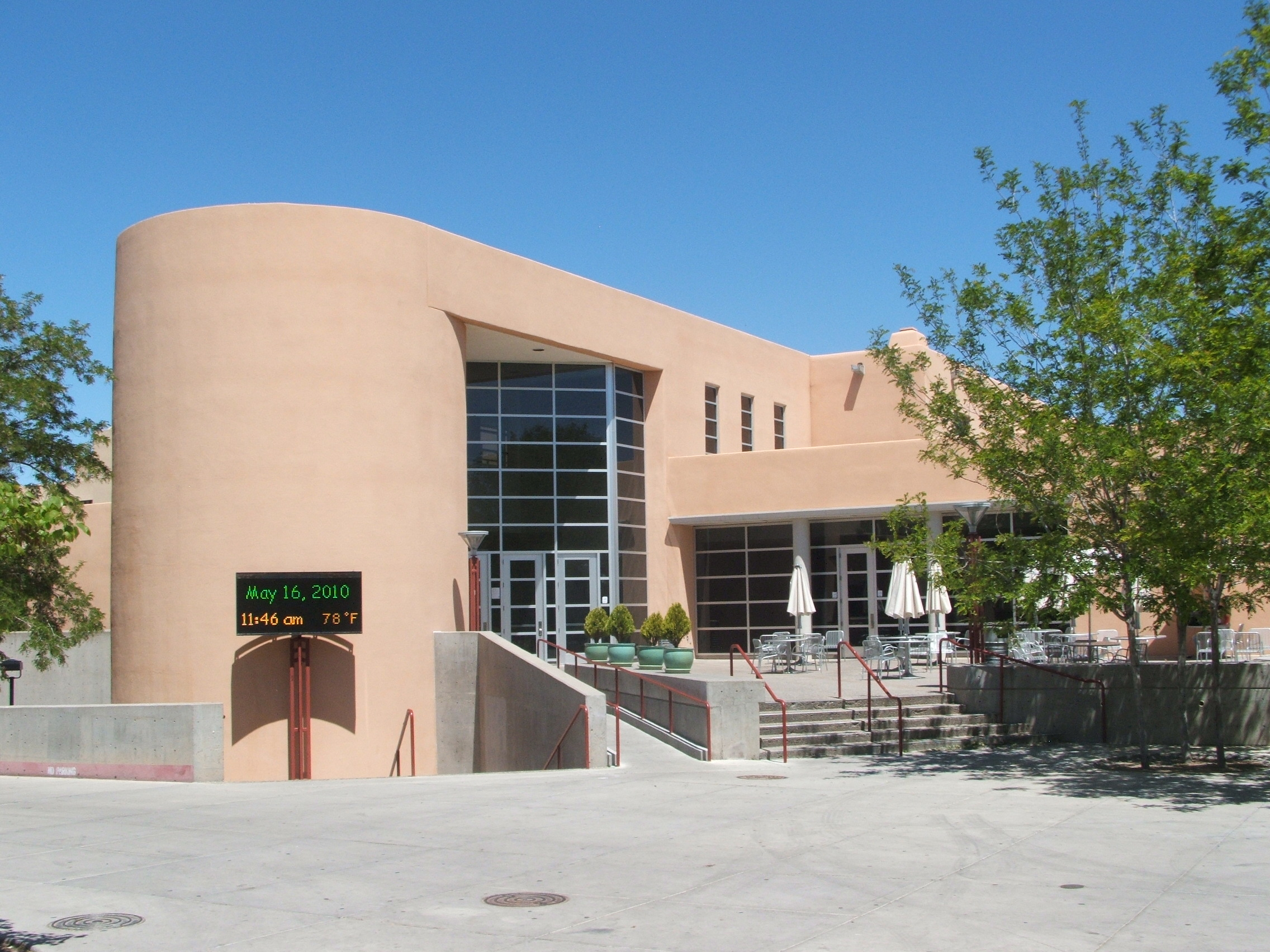
- The Student Union Building on the campus of the University of New Mexico, where the incident occurred.
- Date: May 8, 1970
- Location: University of New Mexico, Albuquerque, New Mexico, United States
- Type: Mass stabbing, Attempted Mass murder
- Target: Vietnam War protesters
- Perpetrator: New Mexico Army National Guard
- Deaths: 0
- Injuries: 11

A bayoneting incident between students protesting on the campus of the University of New Mexico (UNM) and the New Mexico Army National Guard took place on May 8, 1970, in Albuquerque, New Mexico. Students protested on campus for several days leading up to the incident as a response to the Kent State shooting that had happened four days prior. The protest was also part of a larger series of anti-war demonstrations that occurred on college campuses across the United States during the late 1960s and early 1970s to voice opposition to US involvement in the Vietnam War. In the days leading up to the incident, students occupied the Student Union and Air Force ROTC buildings on campus, which led to UNM President Ferrel Heady and the Board of Regents' decision to court order the temporary closure of the Student Union Building. Heady encouraged students to leave, and many did before police arrested the remaining 131 protesters. As the building was being cleared out, the National Guard arrived and bayoneted a crowd that had gathered around the Student Union Building. During the incident, 10 or 11 people including students, teachers, and media members received bayonet wounds, though no deaths occurred.

== Background ==
=== Vietnam War ===
During the Vietnam War in the late 1960s and early 1970s, many college students across the United States participated in anti-war demonstrations and protests. Although protesters urged the US to withdraw troops and end the war, the anti-Vietnam War movement was a more broad movement for greater peace and less war. When Richard Nixon became president, anti-war activists expanded their efforts. This would result in the increase of the anti-war movement in college campuses. Throughout his presidency, Richard Nixon often publicly portrayed both a desire to prolong and win the war as well as a desire to be a peacemaker. Nixon's efforts to win the election and re-election focused on the promise of ending the war without true desire to actually cease military operations in Vietnam.

==== Invasion of Cambodia – college protests, and Kent State incident ====
On April 30, 1970, Nixon launched US troops into Cambodia. For those who hoped that Nixon was tapering off war efforts, this appeared to be a strong escalation of military action that was moving the US further from peace. Nixon spoke about the invasion as a necessary evil to preserve democracy, freedom, and US power, which further reinforced the belief that he had no plans of ending the war any time soon. College students on many campuses reacted by going on strike. Within 10 days over 500 universities had gone on strike and more than 100,000 protesters had marched in Washington DC. On May 4, 1970, students at Kent State University gathered to protest the invasion of Cambodia and the Vietnam War. The National Guard was ordered to campus and began firing on students. Four students including two that were not part of the protest were killed and nine were injured. This only increased student activism as students began protesting about the Vietnam War, the invasion of Cambodia, and the Kent State shooting, leading to the largest college student strike in the history of the United States.

=== University of New Mexico ===
The Kent State incident sparked many protests on college campuses throughout the entire United States, including at the University of New Mexico. As students at UNM learned about the Kent State shooting they joined in those protests and strikes.

== Timeline ==
=== May 4, 1970 ===
On May 4, 1970, actress and anti-Vietnam War activist Jane Fonda visited students at the University of New Mexico. Fonda encouraged students to engage in "non-violent and vigorous protest of Nixon's Cambodia policies." During Fonda's speech, students began planning a strike that was set to begin early on May 6, and created a list of demands for University President Ferrel Heady. After the speech, Fonda and about 150 students proceeded to march to Heady's home where they delivered their demands and protested late into the night. Following the protest, student body president Eric Nelson and The Daily Lobo editor Michael Blake formally encouraged students to participate in a strike with the purpose of protesting Nixon's invasion in Cambodia and the violent Kent State shooting that had happened earlier that day. The students adopted the theme "They Shoot Students, Don't They?" for the strike, a play on words reference to Fonda's star role in the 1969 film They Shoot Horses, Don't They?

=== May 5, 1970 ===
In response to and in mourning of the Kent State shooting, the US flag on UNM campus was lowered to half staff. Around 12 pm, several hundred students gathered around the flag pole and debated whether or not the flag should be flown at half staff or raised to full staff. The debate lasted well into the afternoon with the flag being raised and lowered throughout the day until campus officials removed the flag at about 5 pm.

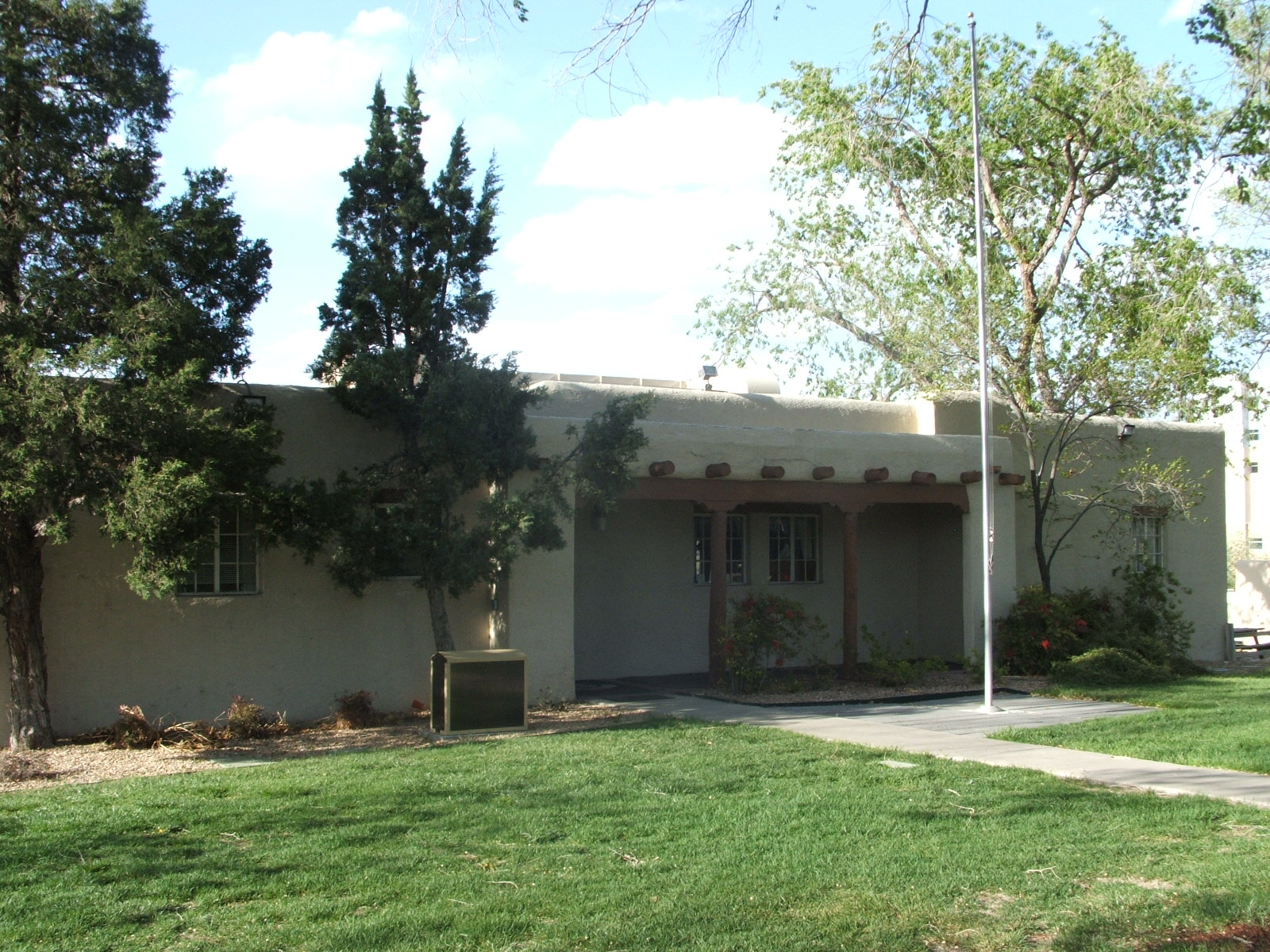
The University of New Mexico Air Force ROTC Building that was occupied by students on May 5, 1970.

At about 10:30 pm, a group of 250–325 students marched to the Air Force ROTC (AFROTC) building in protest of US military action in Cambodia. The group, which had been planning strike activities for the following day, decided that action was needed immediately despite pleas from student body president Eric Nelson to continue preparations for the strike until the following day. Upon arriving at the AFROTC building, ROTC members attempted to prevent protesters from entering the building. Their efforts were ultimately unsuccessful as 50–75 students occupied the building at approximately 12 am and removed those who were not part of the protest. Concerned about the occupation, New Mexico Governor David Cargo spoke with President Heady at some point during the night to discuss the potential need to send in the National Guard if the strike escalated. Students left the AFROTC building in the early morning after President Heady threatened to have students who occupied the building after 6 am arrested.

Throughout the day, efforts were made to bring awareness to the strike that would begin early May 6. Eric Nelson encouraged students to spread information about the planned strike and added his name to a petition with over 220 other student body presidents from universities across the country urging politicians to impeach Richard Nixon. Donald Burge, an editor in the student run newspaper The Daily Lobo, published an editorial that would print the next morning calling for student participation in the strike and threatened that the strike was "the last nonviolent protest that can be made....If Nixon does decide that killing, and the rape of the countryside must continue, we are perfectly willing and perfectly capable to bring that violence and that rape home."

=== May 6, 1970 ===
At 7 am, Glen Anglese, a Vietnam War veteran and student at UNM, called police to report that protestors had raised a "strike or 'unity' banner depicting three upraised, clenched fists" to the flag pole where the US flag was usually flown. By 11 am that banner had been removed by the Albuquerque Fire Department and burned by students who wanted the US flag flown at full staff. Debates about flying the US flag from the previous day were reignited, this time escalating to fist fights. UNM student body president Eric Nelson and vice president Frank Lihn attempted to stop the fighting at around noon by removing the flag entirely. Later, Andy Lucero and a group of students raised the flag to full staff, claiming that campus police had approved the raising of the flag once again. They guarded the flag to ensure that it would not be lowered, and were attacked by five protesters with knives. Three people, including Rex Sewell (stabbed in the upper back), Jerry Buckner (stabbed in the back twice), and Galand Coffman (stabbed in the neck and back) were injured and taken to the hospital. Five men including David Bookert, Ernest Malry, Sam Johnson, Donald Walton, and Eddie Segears were charged with aggravated battery but the charges were later dropped due to difficulty prosecuting the case. The incident caused University President Ferrel Heady to consider closing the university campus due to the potential for more violence.

Throughout the day, approximately 800 protesters participated in the university strike. They first met at the Student Union Building where student body president Eric Nelson spoke to students and reminded them "We must use peaceful means of communication without the bias of violence." The students moved to the anthropology building where they stopped an exam from being administered. Josh Sager, a student, promised his fellow protesters that "We're going to keep protesting until we get out of Cambodia." At around 3 pm, the students moved back to the Student Union Building where they formally occupied the building. The regents viewed this student occupation as being about more than simply student grievances related to Cambodia and the Vietnam War, it was also a battle of "student power versus regent power." Campus officials then decided to close UNM as a precautionary measure until Monday, May 11, but allowed students to continue to occupy the Student Union Building after talking with State Police Head of Intelligence Major Hoover Wimberly and deciding that students did not pose a serious threat at that time.

Later, in the evening, witnesses reported seeing William Lee Stone intentionally ramming his vehicle into groups of protesters walking on campus. Four people were injured, including Michael Montgomery who was thrown onto the vehicle and experienced head injuries. All four were taken to the hospital but released the same day. Stone fled from the scene but turned himself in later that night.

=== May 7, 1970 ===
Students continued to occupy the Student Union Building throughout May 7 and UNM remained closed. Although the strike continued, May 7 was calm compared to the violence that had occurred the day before. Students planned to march in downtown Albuquerque to the Sandia Corporation. This was proposed by student body president Eric Nelson, who said the company was a "major link in the nation's defense research." Other possible march locations included the Kirtland Air Force Base and the Federal Building. Those two sites would eventually become march locations later in the week.

That day, a group of 15 students traveled to Santa Fe to talk with Governor Cargo about the student strike. He promised that the National Guard would not be sent to the university campus unless the protest turned violent and destructive.

=== May 8, 1970 ===
On the morning of May 8, 1970, UNM President Ferrel Heady met with the Board of Regents to discuss the student strike and occupation of the Student Union Building. The Board decided to file a court order to force students to leave the Student Union Building in the interest of preventing damage to the building and property. Although the order provided for the use of force to clear the building, the UNM Board of Regents did not request that the National Guard be sent, instead opting for campus and city police. Students learned about the court order at about 8:45 am, and Heady visited the Student Union Building at about 10 am, asking students to voluntarily clear the building.

At 11 am, about 300 of the protesters occupying the Student Union Building left to participate in a previously scheduled march in downtown Albuquerque. The protesters marched from UNM campus to the Federal Building, from there to Robinson Park, and finally back to the Student Union Building. During the march, students from Albuquerque High School appeared to initially join the march but instead began throwing rocks at protesters. Police intervened by creating a barrier between the two groups, shielding the marchers, and threatening to use tear gas on the high school students. One marcher was hospitalized after being hit by a rock.

Later in the afternoon, the Board of Regents reconvened and decided that the Student Union Building could remain open under the supervision of the Union Board and the Faculty Policy Committee. However, this message never reached students or the National Guard, who were already on their way to campus under the direction of State Police Chief Martin Vigil. State Police arrived between 5 and 6 pm, read the court order, and gave students 20 minutes to clear the building. About half of the remaining students left, but 131 stayed including student body president Eric Nelson, and all 131 were arrested. Students did not resist arrest or retaliate in any way. At about 6:15 pm, the National Guard arrived and set up a defensive line with bayonets out. Calvin Horn, who became a university regent in 1971, later viewed footage of the event and described that "the milling crowd was no mob, no armed band of rebels....There was no resistance, no attempt to fight, just an average group of students...There was nothing to indicate a need for gas masks or unsheathed bayonets." The Guard rushed the crowd which included students, teachers, and media members, indiscriminately stabbing people with their bayonets. Reports conflict about whether 10 or 11 people were injured in the incident. By 7 pm, the crowd had cleared and the Student Union Building was closed. The National Guard left campus at around midnight.

== Injuries ==
10 or 11 people were injured during the incident including:

- Bill Norlander, 26, a reporter for KOB-TV. In an interview 50 years after the incident, Norlander recalled "There were about six holes in the shirt I was wearing, but only one strike got me in the chest and another got me in the left arm." Norlander's chest injury was not deep.
- Sonny Flowers, a student. Flowers had previously broken a leg and was on crutches, which he used to try and defend himself. He was pushed down. Steve Part recalled seeing "a guardsman strike [Flowers] in the chest with the butt of his rifle."
- Steve Sullivan, 18, a student. Sullivan was stabbed in the arm, puncturing an artery, as he attempted to help Flowers.
- Stephen (Steve) Part, 24, a journalism student. While tying a handkerchief on Sullivan's arm, Part was stabbed in the back, began to bleed out, and needed stitches.
- Forrest Rutherford, a freshman student. Rutherford reported that while near the Fine Arts Building a guardsman "jabbed at me and got me in the arm....He never said a word to me."
- Mary Borkless, a student photographer. Borkless was stabbed in the left arm while taking pictures.
- John Dressman, 22, a teacher in Santa Fe. Dressman was stabbed in the upper torso and the back of the thigh. He spent two weeks recovering in the hospital from a punctured femoral artery.
- Bill Swortwood, who was stabbed in the hip.
- Garry Klein, a photographer for the Lobo and graduate student in History, was stabbed in the arm by a Guardsman with a bayonet, after refusing to hand over his camera.
- And two or three other unknown individuals.

== Aftermath ==
On May 9, 1970, a meeting consisting of the Board of Regents, President Heady, Governor Cargo, school administrators, and a group of students was held to discuss the incident. During the course of the almost five-hour meeting, attendees bemoaned the Guard's deployment and students demanded answers. At the meeting, a plan was proposed to end the strike, open UNM on Monday with normal operations, give students the personal option to continue, withdraw, take a pass/fail grade, or end classes for the semester, and to make UNM a "free university." UNM faculty met May 11 and approved the plan. Under the "free university" program, students had the option of participating in classes designed to open free discussion about political and university issues that mattered to students. The classes offered included "Cambodia and U.S. foreign and domestic policy, ecology, defense contracts, the military in national decision making, the UNM Physical Plant strike, University governance, violence vs. non-violence, racism and the BYU issue, and ROTC." The university resumed normal operations on May 11, 1970.

On May 9, 1970, Chief Vigil took full responsibility for deploying the National Guard, but also defended his actions, saying that his intent was to protect the students who were involved in the protest. Later that afternoon, about 200 students gathered to condemn the State's deployment of the National Guard and voted 105–90 to call for the removal of President Heady from his position. The following day about 250 students protested at the Kirtland Air Force Base and police used tear gas to push them back, arresting an additional 43 protesters as well. Students continued to express their disdain about the Guard's involvement, citing feelings of betrayal and unsafety. Vigil again defended his actions, saying that "he would still call the National Guard to the University of New Mexico in the same circumstances." On May 20, 1970, Vigil released an intelligence briefing about the incident, claiming that after reviewing footage of the incident it was clear that protesters who had been injured had "in each case...approached the National Guard and provoked a confrontation." Guardsmen that had participated in the incident, other police officers, and Albuquerque media coverage all defended the National Guard and condemned student actions, though future regent Calvin Horn wrote that video evidence contradicted those accounts, providing "convincing evidence that there was no organized student plan for clashing with anyone." In the fall of 1970, six of the people who were injured during the incident sued the state of New Mexico but the case was dismissed after the prosecution failed to successfully place legal responsibility on the defendant.

The week after the incident the 131 protesters that were arrested were charged with criminal trespassing, and 20 of those individuals were also charged with violation of court order.
