= Partially Buried Woodshed =

Artwork by Robert Smithson

Coordinates: 41°8′37.11″N 81°20′22.03″W

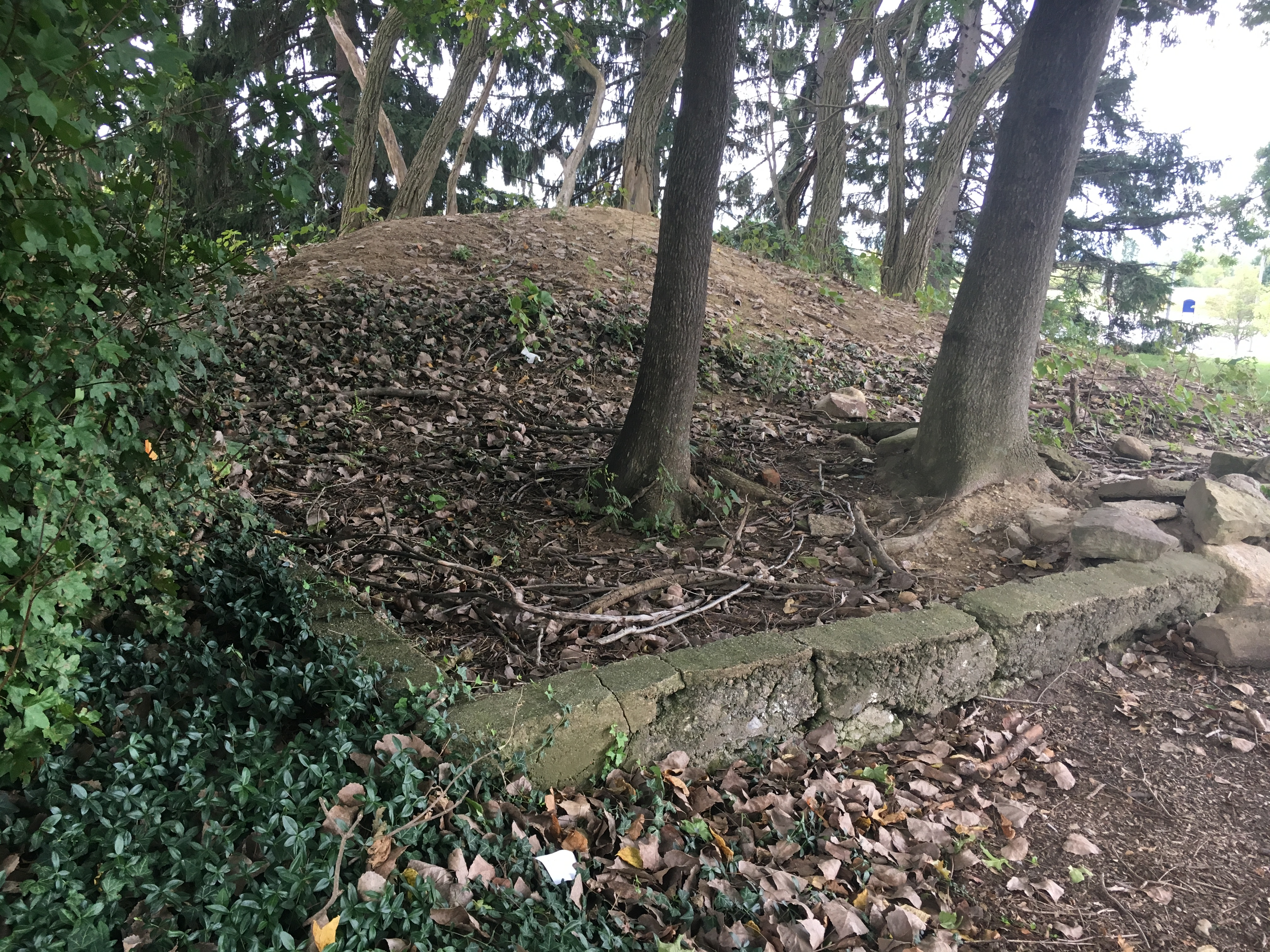
- Artist: Robert Smithson
- Year: 1970
- Medium: Twenty truckloads of earth on a woodshed.
- Movement: Land Art
- Dimensions: (Original) 18'6" x 10'2" x 45'
- Location: Kent, Ohio
- Owner: Kent State University School of Art

Partially Buried Woodshed is a work of land art created by American artist Robert Smithson in January 1970 at Kent State University in Kent, Ohio. The work consisted of an existing woodshed and earth added by the artist in order to illustrate the concept of entropy. By 2018, only a large mound of dirt and the structure's concrete foundation remain. The remaining elements, along with an informational plaque, are located in a small wooded area immediately behind the Liquid Crystal Institute building on the Kent State University main campus, in the southeastern area of Kent.

== History ==
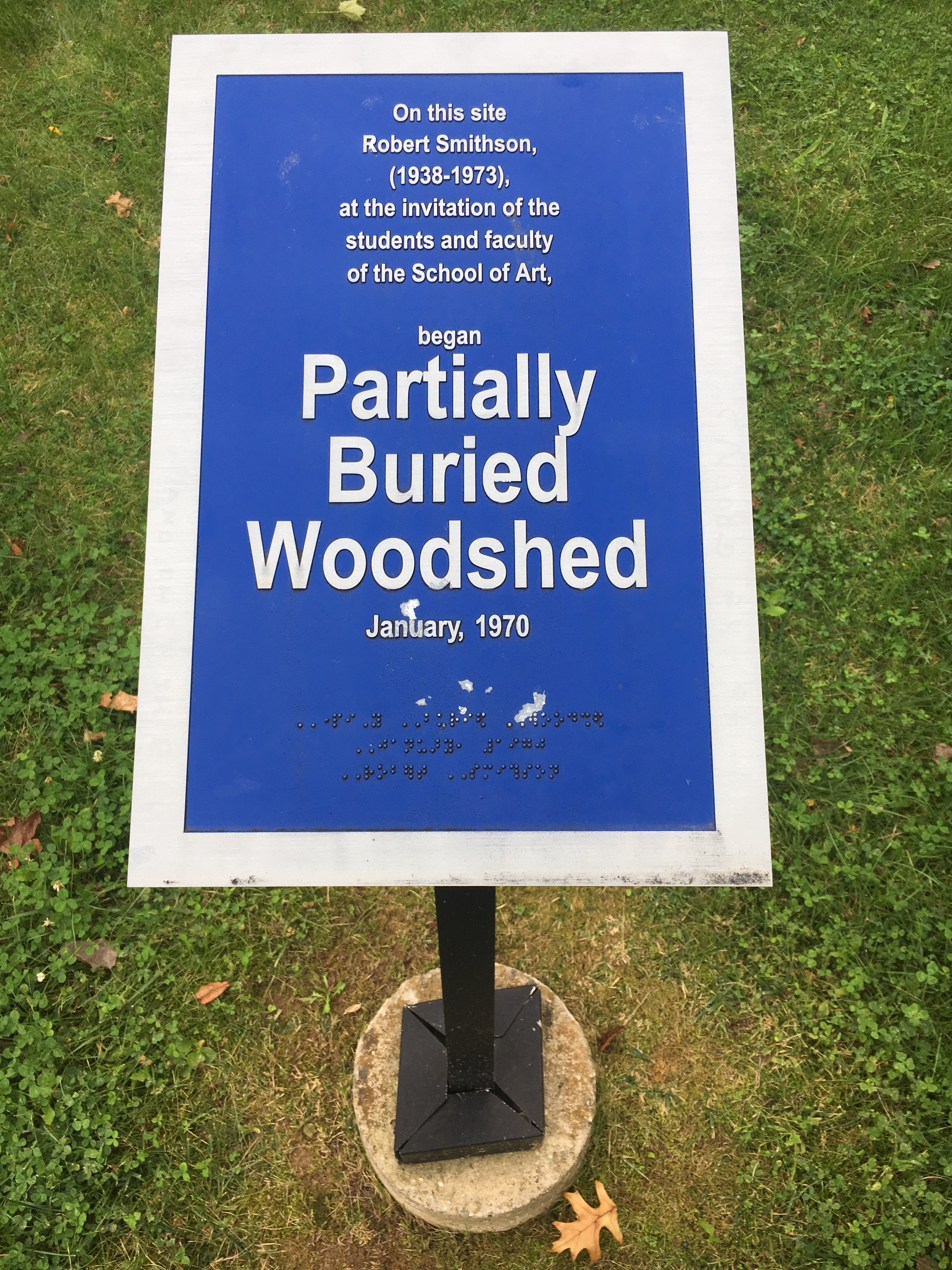
Plaque marking the site of the Partially Buried Woodshed

In January 1970 Robert Smithson visited Kent State University as part of the School of Art Creative Arts Festival. Initially, he had planned to do a mudflow sculpture, but cold temperatures prevented him from being able to dig the dirt needed for the project. Instead, he created Partially Buried Woodshed using an old woodshed from a former farm on the eastern edge of campus that had recently been acquired by the school. Smithson rented a backhoe and transported 20 truck loads of dirt onto the right side of the woodshed until the center beam cracked, marking the beginning of the structure’s decline. He valued the work at $10,000 and donated it to the university, asking that no changes be made and that the structure be allowed to deteriorate naturally. Shortly after the May 4, 1970, Kent State shootings, an anonymous person added the inscription 'MAY 4 KENT 70' with white paint to one of the structure's horizontal beams. The addition of the message about May 4, 1970 helped make the Partially Buried Woodshed one of the many memorial sites on campus.

The work was set on fire by an unknown arsonist on March 28, 1975, burning much of the left side and causing the structure's major collapse. The University Arts Commission recommended in April that the roof and burned portion be removed—mostly citing safety concerns—with the remaining walls, earthen mound, and rafters allowed to continue the natural aging process. By late April, the university had much of the damaged section removed and planned to landscape the area around the sculpture as a park. Smithson's widow, Nancy Holt, visited the work on May 3, 1975, and called for its preservation. A committee recommended in June 1975 that the entire sculpture be removed, citing liability concerns, though university president Glenn Olds ultimately decided to keep the remains of the sculpture in 1976. Sometime in mid-1981, the center beam fully broke, and in January 1984, the remaining wooden elements of the structure were quietly removed by the university. While the School of Art hosted exhibits in 1990 for the 20th anniversary of the work's creation, and again in 2005 for the 35th anniversary, the location of the artwork was largely ignored until Kent State University added an informational plaque to a sidewalk near the site in 2016.
