= Ruth Warrick =

American singer, actress and activist (1916–2005)

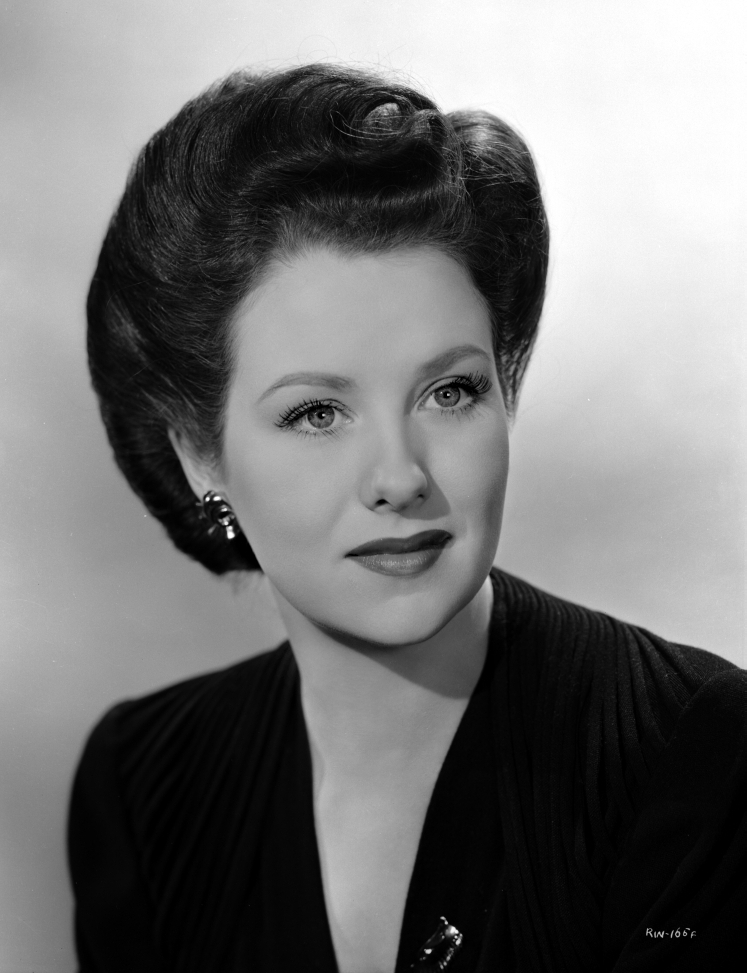
- Born: Ruth Elizabeth Warrick; June 29, 1916; Saint Joseph, Missouri, U.S.
- Died: January 15, 2005 (aged 88); New York City, U.S.
- Occupations: Actress; singer; activist
- Years active: 1940–2005
- Spouses: Erik Rolf (m. 1938; div. 1946) Carl Neubert (m. 1950; div. 1952) (m. 1961; div. 1963) Robert McNamara (m. 1953; div. 1960) Frank Freda (m. 1972; div. 1973) Jarvis Cushing (m. 1975; div. 1976)
- Children: 3

Ruth Elizabeth Warrick (June 29, 1916 – January 15, 2005) was an American singer, actress and political activist, best known for her role as Phoebe Tyler Wallingford on All My Children, which she played regularly from 1970 until her death in 2005. She made her film debut in Citizen Kane, and years later celebrated her 80th birthday by attending a special screening of the film.

== Early life and career ==
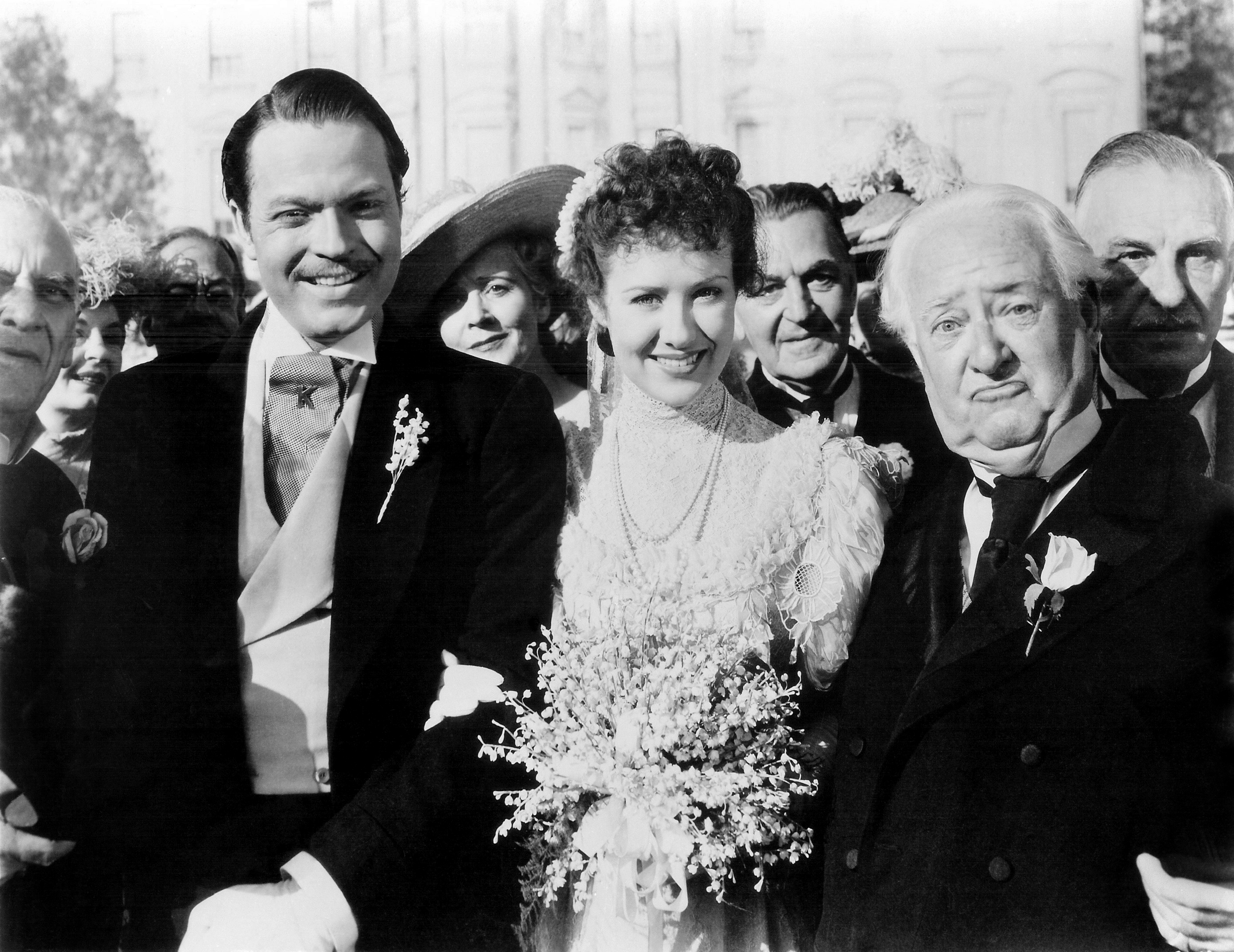
As Emily Monroe Norton, the bride of Orson Welles' character, Charles Foster Kane, in Citizen Kane (1941)

Ruth Warrick was born June 29, 1916, in Saint Joseph, Missouri, to Frederick Roswell Warrick and Annie Louise Warrick, née Scott. By writing an essay in high school called "Prevention and Cure of Tuberculosis", Warrick won a contest to be Miss Jubilesta, Missouri's paid ambassador to New York City.

There she began her career as a radio singer, and met her first husband Erik Rolf.

Warrick's first big break was being hired by a young Orson Welles for Citizen Kane (1941), in which she played Emily Monroe Norton, niece of the President of the United States and Kane's first wife. Welles pulled her photograph from the hundreds he had been sent by agents; he recognized her from a radio show they had worked on together in 1938. He spoke with her in New York: "I'm not looking for an actress that can play a lady," he said, "I want an actress who is a lady." She was in California within days, making several screen tests including one with Welles, and was regarded as perfect for the role. Warrick was expecting her first child during the filming of Kane, which prevented her being cast in The Magnificent Ambersons.

But she worked on a 1942 episode ("My Little Boy") of Welles's radio series, and Welles hired her again for Journey into Fear (1943).

Warrick appeared in The Corsican Brothers, The Iron Major, Mr. Winkle Goes to War, and Guest in the House.

Following World War II, she had a role in the Academy Award-winning Disney film Song of the South; she also appeared in Daisy Kenyon, which starred Joan Crawford and Henry Fonda. By the late 1940s, her film roles were becoming infrequent and less notable. After playing Betty Hutton's sister-in-law in Let's Dance, she starred as a troubled wife looking back at her life in the religious drama Second Chance and as an alcoholic wife and mother in One Too Many (all 1950).

In the 1950s, she befriended soap opera executives Irna Phillips and Agnes Nixon. Warrick became a cast member on the soap opera The Guiding Light, playing Janet Johnson, R.N. from 1953 to 1954.

Phillips was impressed by Warrick's performance and hired her for her new soap opera, As the World Turns, which debuted in 1956. Her character, Edith Hughes, was madly in love with a married man, Jim Lowell. Phillips wanted the characters to live happily ever after, but Procter & Gamble, which owned the show, demanded that the characters not endorse adultery, so Jim "died". Warrick worked on the show until 1960.

From 1959 to 1960, she understudied for Una Merkel and (future All My Children co-star) Eileen Herlie in the Broadway musical, Take Me Along. During the 1961-62 television season, she starred in Father of the Bride television series. Then, in 1965, she joined the cast of the primetime serial, Peyton Place, playing Hannah Cord. While there had been primetime serials before (such as One Man's Family), none previously had enjoyed the phenomenal success of Peyton Place. Warrick received an Emmy Award nomination for her work on this serial in 1967, the same year that she left the show.

In 1969, she made her last major film, The Great Bank Robbery. During this time, Agnes Nixon had been moving up the daytime television ranks. She had created her own show, One Life to Live, in 1968. ABC approved her new show, All My Children, in 1969.

== All My Children ==
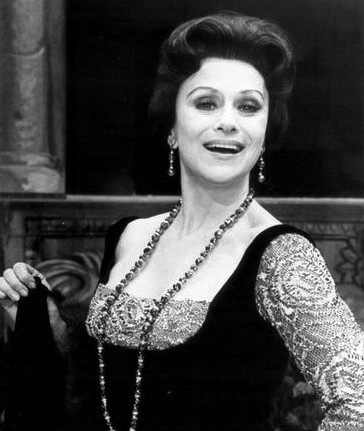
As Mrs. Emmeline Marshall in the Broadway musical Irene

When All My Children debuted on January 5, 1970, Warrick was among the contracted cast, playing Pine Valley's imperious matriarch Phoebe Tyler (the character's full name via her marriages would eventually be Phoebe English Tyler Wallingford Matthews Wallingford). The show was an instant hit, and Phoebe became a popular character. While her role was originally that of a serious society snob concerned mainly with keeping her family's name at the top of the town's social register, Warrick later began to add much humor into the role, especially when her character, separated from her husband of many years, began having an affair with phony professor Langley Wallingford, and eventually married him. Warrick received Daytime Emmy Award nominations in 1975 and 1977.

Due to health problems, actor Louis Edmonds, who portrayed Warrick's husband, left the show in 1995. Combined with Warrick's own health problems, that signaled a reduction in her screen time in the 1990s.

After breaking her hip while on vacation in Greece in 2001, Warrick had to use a wheelchair. She had a brief re-emergence in 2002 when her character Phoebe made a return appearance at a hospital board meeting and later attended a society function with niece Brooke. Warrick was seldom on screen, but did appear on All My Children's 35th anniversary show on January 5, 2005. That was her final screen appearance. She died on January 15, 2005.

== Singing, writing and politics ==
In 1971, she published a single with the song "41,000 Plus 4 The Ballad of the Kent State Massacre". It was a tribute to Sandra Lee Scheuer, William Knox Schroeder, Jeffrey Glenn Miller, and Allison Beth Krause, the four students killed at Kent State University by National Guard soldiers during a demonstration against the Vietnam War.

She published her autobiography, The Confessions of Phoebe Tyler (co-written by Don Preston) in 1980, the same year she won a Soapy Award (a prelude to the Soap Opera Digest Awards). She received a star on the Hollywood Walk of Fame and was on hand to receive her Daytime Emmy Award for Lifetime Achievement in 2004.

Warrick was a member of the Democratic Party, working with the administrations of John F. Kennedy, Lyndon Johnson, and Jimmy Carter on labor and education issues. Upon Carter's 1980 defeat, she sent him a long letter thanking him for his efforts. He replied, telling her that if he had hired her as a speechwriter, he would have been reelected. Warrick had generally liberal political views. In her first years at All My Children, Warrick was flustered by her character's conservative politics and support of U.S. involvement in the Vietnam War, which Warrick strongly opposed.

In July 2000, she refused to accept a lifetime achievement award from the South Carolina Arts Commission because she was offended by legislators' decision to move the Confederate flag from the state Capitol dome to another spot on the grounds in response to a boycott of the state by flag opponents. A lifelong supporter of African-American rights, she felt the flag should be removed completely, and commented, "In my view, this was no compromise. It was a deliberate affront to the African-Americans, who see it as a sign of oppression and hate".

In 1991, Warrick received a certification as a licensed metaphysical teacher from a Unity school in Lee's Summit, Missouri.

== Death ==
Warrick died of complications related to pneumonia on January 15, 2005, aged 88, at her home in Manhattan.

== Legacy ==
The January 24, 2005 episode of All My Children was dedicated "In Loving Memory of Ruth Warrick". Phoebe died offscreen on May 4. Phoebe's funeral was aired May 12, 2005. The episode featured many of Warrick's most notable performances as flashbacks, and included the return of many of the characters who had been closely involved in her storylines over the years. Warrick was included in the memorial tribute at the 11th Screen Actors Guild Awards.

Film historian Scott Feinberg conducted the final interview with Warrick on August 14, 2004, at her apartment in New York Cityput The auction included her extensive collection of art and photographs, as well as books signed by Bill and Hillary Clinton. Signed scripts from Peyton Place and All My Children, as well as her Broadway appearances were also in the catalog. The centerpiece of the catalog was the 25th anniversary reprint script of Citizen Kane, signed by Warrick, Cotten, and Welles, one of only 100 printed. Her family donated her 2004 Lifetime Achievement Emmy Award to a museum in her hometown of Saint Joseph, Missouri.

== Film credits ==
Year	Title	Role	Notes
1940	Citizen Kane trailer	Emily Monroe Norton	Short
1941	Citizen Kane	Emily Monroe Norton	Film debut
1941	The Corsican Brothers	Isabelle Gravini	
1942	Obliging Young Lady	Linda Norton	
1943	Journey into Fear	Stephanie Graham	
1943	Forever and a Day	Leslie Trimble	
1943	Petticoat Larceny	Pat Mitchell	
1943	The Iron Major	Florence Ayres Cavanaugh	
1944	Guest in the House	Ann Proctor	
1944	Mr. Winkle Goes to War	Amy Winkle	
1944	Secret Command	Lea Damaron	
1945	China Sky	Dr. Sara Durand	
1946	Perilous Holiday	Agnes Stuart	
1946	Song of the South	Sally	
1947	Swell Guy	Ann Duncan	
1947	Driftwood	Susan Moore	
1947	Daisy Kenyon	Lucile O'Mara	
1948	Arch of Triumph	Kate Bergstroem	Scenes removed
1949	Make Believe Ballroom	Liza Lee	
1949	The Great Dan Patch	Ruth Treadwell	
1950	Beauty on Parade	Marian Medford	
1950	Second Chance	Emily Dean	
1950	Let's Dance	Carola Everett	
1950	Three Husbands	Jane Evans	
1951	One Too Many	Helen Mason / Helen Leroy Lintz	
1954	Roogie's Bump	Mrs. Rigsby	
1965	A Letter To Nancy	Mrs. Helen Reed	
1966	Ride Beyond Vengeance	Aunt Gussie	
1968	How to Steal the World	Alice Garrow	
1969	The Great Bank Robbery	Mrs. Applebee	
1983	The Returning	Grace	
1984	Death Mask	Beatrice VandenBerg	

== Selected television appearances ==
Year	Title	Role	Notes
1961–1962	Father of the Bride	Ellie Banks	TV series main cast; 34 episodes
1964	Perry Mason	Mrs. Winlock	Season 8 Episode 13: "The Case of the Blonde Bonanza":
1965	Gunsmoke	Clara Benteen	Season 11 Episode 2: "The Storm"
1965–1969	Peyton Place	Hannah Cord	88 episodes
1968	The Man from U.N.C.L.E.	Alice Garrow	Season 4 Episode 15: "The Seven Wonders of the World: Part I"
1970–2005	All My Children	Phoebe Tyler Wallingford	511 episodes
