= Prynne =

Prynne is a surname. Notable people with the surname include:

- Edward Arthur Fellowes Prynne (1854–1921), British painter
- George Fellowes Prynne (1853–1927), British architect
- George Rundle Prynne (1818–1903), British Anglo-Catholic cleric
- J. H. Prynne (Jeremy Halvard Prynne, 1936–2026), British poet and literary critic
- Michael Whitworth Prynne (1912–1977), British Army major general
- William Prynne (1600–1669), English Puritan politician

== See also ==
- Hester Prynne, the protagonist of the novel The Scarlet Letter
- Prine
- Prinner
