= Carl Prine =

Carl Prine (born November 3, 1966) is a military investigative reporter who worked for the Pittsburgh Tribune-Review from 2000 to 2016 and was involved in a number of investigations into the security of various US facilities. While working with a reporter from 60 Minutes, he helped in the production of a television special that investigated the failings of security at US chemical plants, which received national attention from the media and the government. Subsequently, he re-enlisted in the military for a tour in Iraq.

== Career ==
In his early years of reporting before joining the Pittsburgh Tribune-Review in 2000, Prine worked with The Daily Reporter. After leaving the Reporter, he was involved in covering numerous battlefield situations, such as "wars in Sierra Leone, Liberia and five other nations." Later, he served as a correspondent for The Christian Science Monitor in Sierra Leone.

Beginning in 2002 and through 2003, Prine started an investigation into the security of chemical plants against terrorism and sabotage. His preliminary results were published in the Pittsburgh Tribune-Review in a segment called "Think Like A Terrorist". There was some backlash against the report, but the government was moved to draw up a bill requiring chemical plants to lessen the amount of dangerous chemicals they kept. The bill, however, was "lobbied into oblivion" by the American Chemistry Council.

Not long afterward, Prine began working with 60 Minutes reporter Steve Kroft and continued his investigation of chemical plants to obtain further evidence. The standard procedure they employed was to walk into restricted areas in chemical plants and leave a business card on the hazardous materials storage tanks. However, on September 22, 2003, during an investigation of a chemical plant on Neville Island, after walking into the facility unabated and inspecting the boron trifluoride tanks, they confronted the security manager of the plant upon exiting and he immediately called the police. They were convicted for the offense of trespassing by the District Court, but the verdict was overturned upon appeal at the Allegheny County Courthouse. The team still obtained enough footage from their investigation and a 60 Minutes special aired on November 16, 2003, which discussed Prine's findings that "in many of 60 plants he visited across the country, he was able to walk through wide-open gates to areas where toxic or explosive chemicals were stored." The Neville Island chemical plant responded to the report by saying that it was "misleading" and based on "worst-case data". Not long after the airing, the chemical plant was dropped from the list of members of the American Chemistry Council.

=== Military service ===
Prine joined the United States Marine Corps before becoming a journalist. In 2005, he joined the Pennsylvania Army National Guard and deployed to Iraq with the 1st Battalion of the 110th Infantry Regiment. During the tour, his unit was assigned to an area in between Ramadi and Fallujah.

After returning from his tour in Iraq with the Army National Guard, Prine started a new investigation into "the vulnerability of the nation's 150,000 miles of railroad tracks and, specifically, the thousands of tanks cars rumbling over them every day." During his investigation, Prine found that a list of hundreds of vulnerabilities of the railroad had been compiled by the Federal Railroad Administration, but that none of the information on the list seemed to have been fixed by major railroad companies or the government itself since the list's creation. After the release of his report on the security of the US railroad system, Prine was accused by multiple railroad companies of trying to give terrorists information on how to attack the United States. The owner of the Railroad Development Corporation, Henry Posner III, stated that Prine was "profiting from the promotion of hysteria."

Prine's reporting on football is extensive and he was cited in a 2008 report by the United States House Committee on the Judiciary for his information on the extremely high injury rates in the NFL compared to other professional sports.

In 2011, Prine took over Military.com's Line of Departure blog. In July 2012, he left Line of Departure, citing a persistent migraine resulting from injuries during his military service in Iraq.

=== "Wounded Warrior" Series ===
In 2011, Carl Prine authored an investigative series in the Pittsburgh Tribune-Review on the inadequacy of care for wounded US soldiers returning from Afghanistan and Iraq. This series of articles, based on nine months of investigation, shed light on care delayed by red tape, shoddy facilities, and bureaucratic maneuvering to evade scrutiny and responsibility for the shortcomings of medical care for wounded troops.

== See also ==
- Brad Bumsted
- Randy Bish
- Military.com
