= Prinner =

Prinner is a surname. Notable people with the surname include:

- Anton Prinner (1902–1983), Hungarian-French artist
- Jessica Prinner (born 1992), American racing cyclist
- Josef Prinner (1894–1966), German general

== See also ==
- Prine
