= John Filo =

American photographer (born 1948)

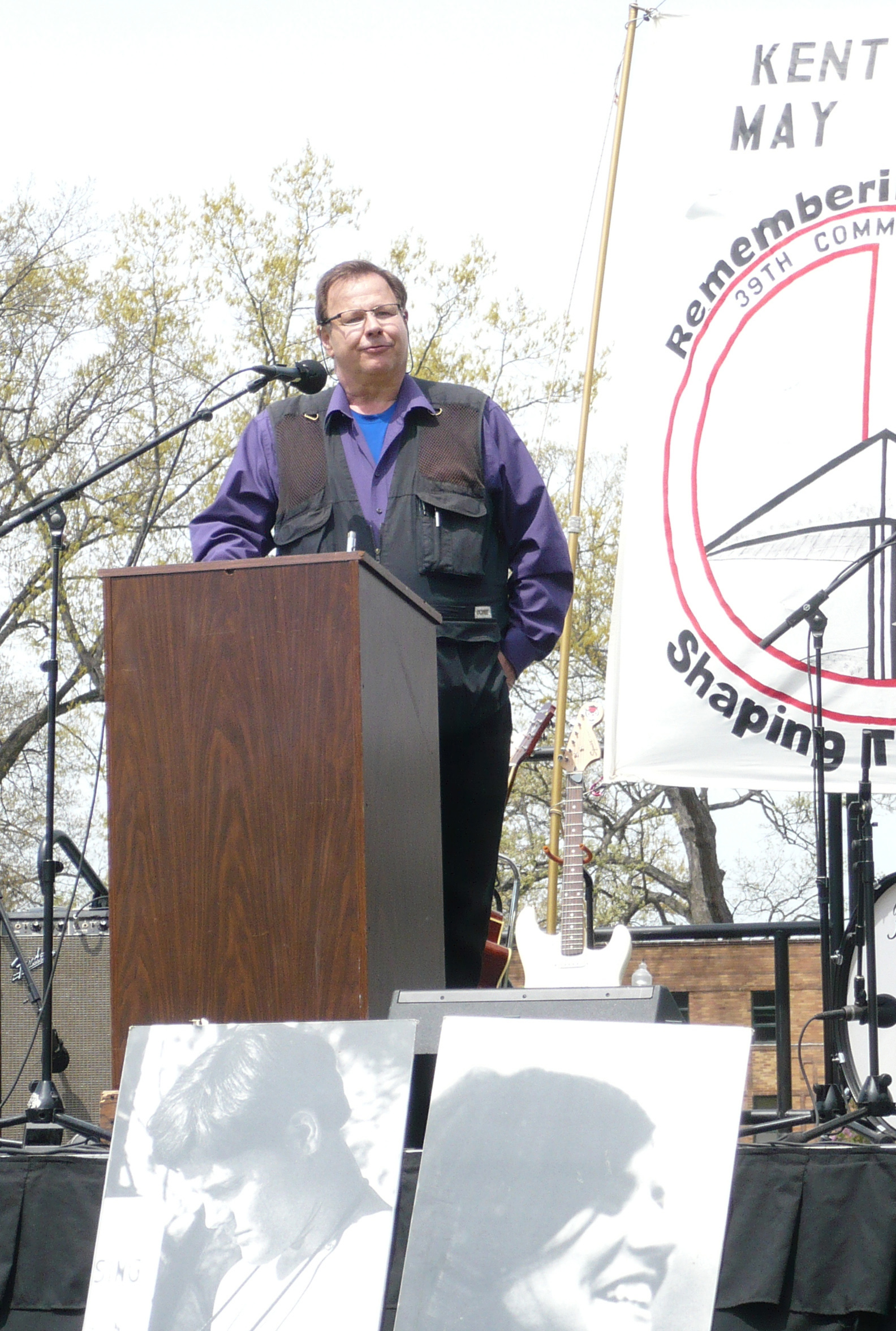
- Filo in 2008
- Born: John Paul Filo; August 21, 1948 (age 78); Natrona Heights, Pennsylvania, United States
- Occupation: Photojournalism
- Notable credit: Pulitzer Prize-winner

John Paul Filo (/ˈfaɪloʊ/; born August 21, 1948) is an American photographer whose picture of 14-year-old runaway Mary Ann Vecchio wailing in grief while kneeling over the dead body of 20-year-old Jeffrey Miller, one of the victims of the Kent State shootings, won the Pulitzer Prize in 1971. Age 21 at the time, Filo was both a photojournalism student at Kent State University, and staffer of the Valley Daily News, which became the Valley News Dispatch and later a satellite paper for the Greensburg Tribune-Review.

== Biography ==
After winning the Pulitzer Prize while working for the Valley Daily News (a Gannett paper) of the Pittsburgh suburb of Tarentum, Pennsylvania, he continued his career in photojournalism, rapidly finding work at the Associated Press, the Philadelphia Inquirer, and as a picture editor at the Baltimore Evening Sun. He eventually rose to a picture editing job at the weekly news magazine Newsweek, and became head of photography for CBS.

== Taking the picture ==
The Kent State shooting by members of the Ohio National Guard occurred at Kent State University in the city of Kent, Ohio on May 4, 1970, and resulted in the deaths of four students. At the time John Filo was in the university student photography lab when the shots rang out. He quickly ran outside and below recalls what happened:

The bullets were supposed to be blanks. When I put the camera back to my eye, I noticed a particular guardsman pointing at me. I said, "I'll get a picture of this," and his rifle went off. And almost simultaneously, as his rifle went off, a halo of dust came off a sculpture next to me, and the bullet lodged in a tree.

I dropped my camera in the realization that it was live ammunition. I don't know what gave me the combination of innocence and stupidity ... I started to flee – run down the hill and stopped myself. "Where are you going?" I said to myself, "This is why you are here!"

And I started to take pictures again. ... I knew I was running out of film. I could see the emotion welling up inside of her. She began to sob. And it culminated in her saying an exclamation. I can't remember what she said exactly ... something like, "Oh, my God!"

— John Filo talking about the Kent State shootings

To take the picture Filo used a Nikkormat camera with Tri-X film and most of the exposures were 1/500 between 5.6 and f 8 depending on whether the sun was behind a cloud or not.

== Altered photo ==
In the early 1970s, an anonymous editor airbrushed the fence post above Mary Ann Vecchio's head out of Filo's Pulitzer Prize-winning photograph. Since then, the altered photo has circulated and has been reprinted in many magazines. Numerous publications, including Time (Nov. 6, 1972, p. 23; Jan. 7, 1980, p. 45) and People (May 2, 1977, p. 37; April 30, 1990, p. 117), have used the altered image without knowing it.

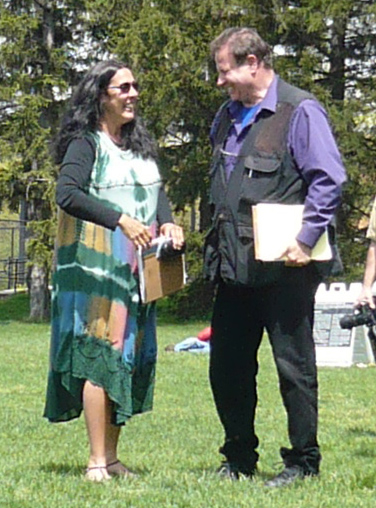
Mary Ann Vecchio meeting John Filo at Kent State University, May 2009

== Meeting with Mary Ann Vecchio ==
In 1995, Filo met Mary Ann Vecchio for the first time, when both were scheduled to appear at an Emerson College conference commemorating the 25th anniversary of the shootings.

The two met again on the Kent State University campus, at the 39th commemoration in May 2009, where they both spoke.
