= Jeffrey Miller (shooting victim) =

Student killed at Kent State University in 1970

- Born: Jeffrey Glenn Miller; March 28, 1950; Plainview, New York, U.S.
- Died: May 4, 1970 (aged 20); Kent State University, Ohio, U.S. 41.1501°N 81.3433°W
- Cause of death: Gunshot wound to mouth
- Resting place: Ferncliff Cemetery
- Occupation: Student
- Known for: Anti-war activism Victim of Kent State shootings

Jeffrey Glenn Miller (March 28, 1950 – May 4, 1970) was an American student at Kent State University in Kent, Ohio, who was shot dead by an Ohio Army National Guardsman in the Kent State shootings. Miller had been protesting against the U.S. invasion of Cambodia and the presence of the National Guard on the Kent State campus. National Guardsmen suddenly opened fire on a group of unarmed students, killing Miller and three others. Miller became the most highly-publicized victim of the shootings, and John Filo’s Pulitzer Prize-winning photograph of Miller appeared in several publications. The imagery of his death would ultimately become a symbol of the anti-war movement during the Vietnam era.

== Biography ==
Miller was born on March 28, 1950, in New York, the son of Elaine Holstein and Bernard Miller. He was Jewish.

Four months before his death in May 1970, Miller had transferred to Kent State from Michigan State University. While at Michigan State, Miller pledged Phi Kappa Tau fraternity where his older brother, Russell, had been a member. He and his brother had always been close and shared a birthday. After his brother graduated from Michigan State, Miller found himself feeling increasingly out of touch with the dominant culture at Michigan State. During the summer of 1969, an old friend from New York who attended Kent State urged Miller to consider transferring. He left Michigan State with four like-minded friends, also MSU students, in January 1970, traveling together to Ann Arbor. He had protested the Vietnam War with these friends at MSU. He went on to Kent State while three of the five remained in Ann Arbor. He quickly adapted to Kent State and soon had many friends, including Allison Krause and Sandra Scheuer. Both Krause and Scheuer — alongside William Schroeder — died alongside Miller on May 4, 1970.

== Death ==
Miller had taken part in the protests that day and had volleyed a tear gas canister back at the Ohio National Guardsmen who had originally fired it. The protests, initially against the expansion of the Vietnam War into Cambodia, had escalated into a protest against the presence of the Ohio National Guard on the Kent State campus. Miller was unarmed when he was shot; he had been facing the Guardsmen while standing in an access road leading into the Prentice Hall parking lot at a distance of approximately 265 feet (81 m). A single bullet entered his open mouth and exited at the base of his posterior skull, killing him instantly. John Filo's Pulitzer Prize-winning photo features Mary Ann Vecchio, a 14-year-old runaway, kneeling over Miller's dead body.

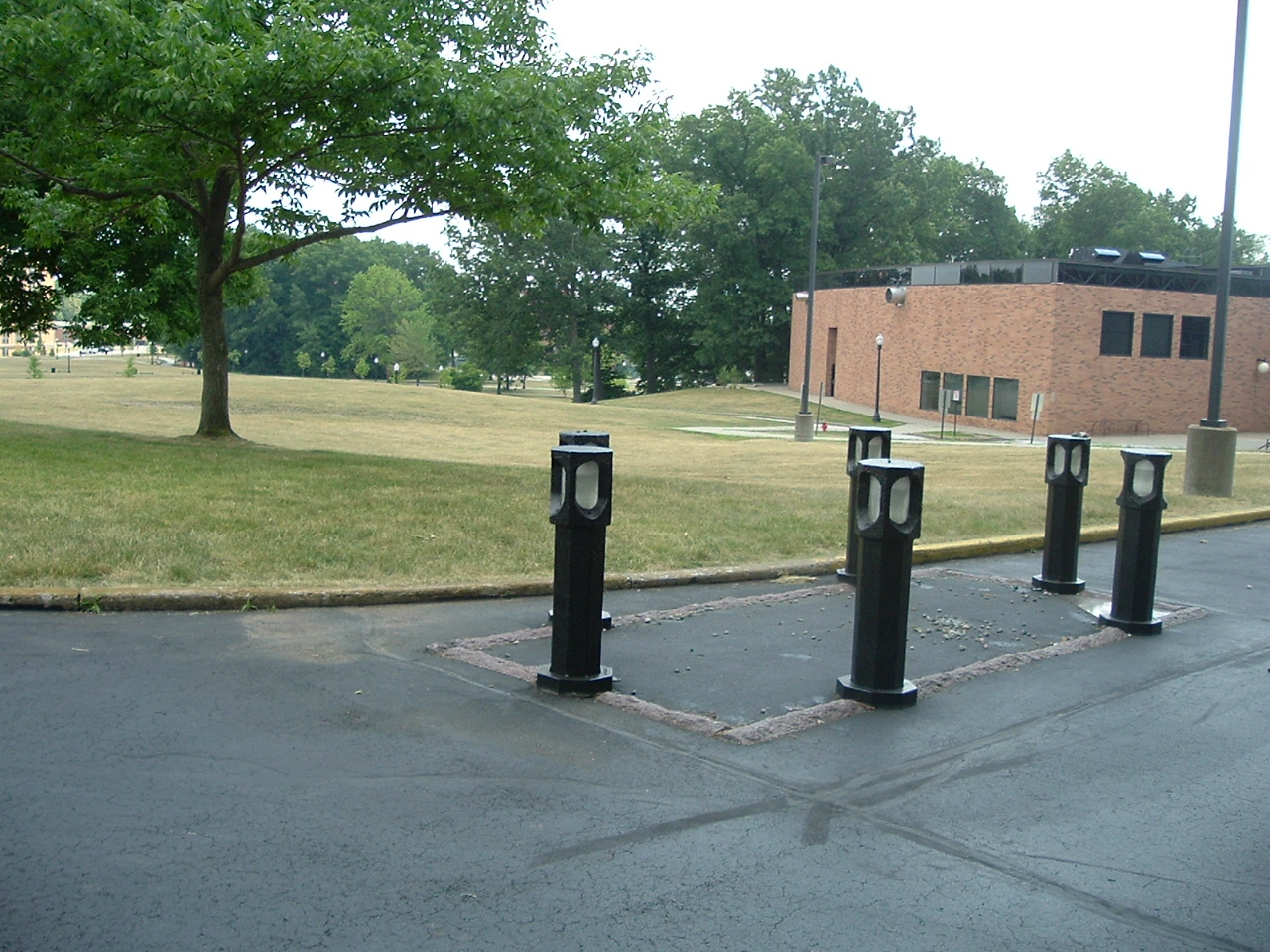
Memorial to Jeffrey Miller at the site at Kent State University where he fell

Three other students were shot and killed at Kent State on that day: Allison Krause, Sandra Scheuer, and William Schroeder; nine others were wounded, including one who was paralyzed for life. These and other shootings led to protests and a national student strike, closing hundreds of campuses. The Kent State campus remained closed for six weeks. Five days after the shootings, 100,000 people demonstrated in Washington, D.C., against the war and the military–industrial complex and protesting the killing of unarmed student protestors by American soldiers on a college campus. Eleven days after the Kent State shootings, on May 15, 1970, two students were shot and killed and 12 were injured at Jackson State University by the Jackson Police and Mississippi Highway Safety Patrol officers.

Miller was cremated and his ashes were placed in a niche in the community mausoleum (Unit 7, Alcove H-O, Column O, Niche 1) at Ferncliff Cemetery in Hartsdale, New York. A memorial was erected at Plainview – Old Bethpage John F. Kennedy High School, the high school that was built in the mid-1960s in the same town as Miller's high school in Plainview, New York. Miller's mother had been a secretary to the principal of John F. Kennedy High School in the 1960s. There is a Kent State Memorial Lecture Fund at MIT established in 1970 by one of Miller's childhood friends. The university has also placed a memorial at the spot where Miller died.
