= Allison Krause =

Student killed at Kent State University in 1970

- Allison Krause, c. 1970
- Born: Allison Beth Krause; April 23, 1951; Cleveland, Ohio, U.S.
- Died: May 4, 1970 (aged 19); Kent State University, Kent, Ohio, U.S. 41.1501°N 81.3433°W
- Cause of death: Gunshot wounds to left arm, chest and stomach
- Resting place: Parkway Jewish Center Cemetery, Wilkins Township, Pennsylvania, U.S. 40.42230°N 79.82540°W (approximate)
- Occupation: Student
- Known for: Anti-war activism Peace activism Victim of Kent State shootings
- Parents: Arthur Selwyn Krause (father); Doris Lillian (née Levine) Krause (mother)

Allison Beth Krause (/kraʊs/; April 23, 1951 – May 4, 1970) was one of four unarmed Kent State University students shot and killed by soldiers of the Ohio Army National Guard in the May 4, 1970 Kent State shootings in Kent, Ohio. The shootings occurred as students protested against both the invasion of Cambodia and the National Guard presence on campus.

Krause—an ardent anti-war activist—was shot in the left side of her chest from a distance of approximately 330 feet (101 m). A subsequent autopsy found that a single bullet entered and exited her upper left arm before entering her left lateral chest, fragmenting on impact and causing extensive internal injuries to her chest and stomach. She died from her wounds before reaching the hospital.

The day prior to her death, Krause observed a single lilac within the barrel of the gun of a guardsman on the campus of Kent State University; upon hearing an officer order the guardsman to remove the flower, she caught the flower as it fell to the ground, stating, "Flowers are better than bullets." This quote—inscribed upon Krause's gravestone—has become synonymous with Krause's legacy of peace activism.

== Early life ==
Krause was born in Cleveland, Ohio, on April 23, 1951, the first child born to Doris Lillian (née Levine) and Arthur Selwyn Krause. She had a younger sister, Laurel (b. 1954). Krause was Jewish. She was an alumna of John F. Kennedy High School in Silver Spring, Maryland, although Krause's parents and younger sister moved to Churchill, Pennsylvania, in the summer of 1969.

The Krause family regularly undertook day trips throughout the sisters' childhood and teenage years. One of these locations was to Kent, Ohio, where the family typically dined at a restaurant overlooking the university campus. Reportedly, Krause resolved to attend the university upon her graduation due to these day trips, informing her mother: "You know, Mom, I'd like to come to school here when I'm old enough."

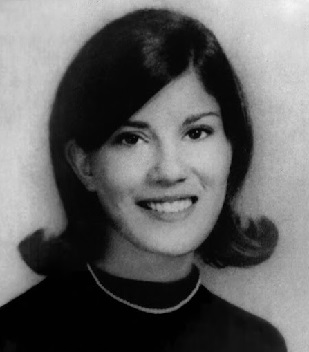
Krause, c. 1968

Krause grew into a tall young woman with high cheekbones, thick, dark hair and brown eyes. Although fashionable, she seldom wore makeup, and her features led some to believe she was of Mediterranean ancestry. Krause typically devoted her free time to solitary pursuits such as drawing, painting, reading, and sculpting. By her late teens, she had also developed an interest in contemporary domestic and global issues in addition to politics and civil rights. She also aspired to teach art to children with disabilities.

== Kent State University ==
An academically accomplished student who typically achieved B plus grades, Krause graduated with honors from John F. Kennedy High School in 1969. She briefly worked within the lingerie department of a Joseph Horne department store in Monroeville before enrolling at Kent State University (KSU), beginning her art and special education classes that September while residing in a dormitory at Metcalf Hall. (Note: Krause would later relocate to another dormitory at Engelman Hall in January 1970.)

While attending KSU, Krause became acquainted with a student named Barry Levine. The two began dating and became almost inseparable. Both were also popular among their peers, who noted Krause occasionally carried a pet kitten she had named "Yo-Yo" and which she discreetly kept in her dormitory room around campus.

=== Political climate ===
By the late 1960s, many young Americans had a negative attitude towards the country's involvement in the Vietnam War and the issue of conscription. These anti-war sentiments were keenly felt among the student population at KSU, and Krause and Levine were active and vocal demonstrators in several student protests. Via both her protesting statements and actions while enrolled at KSU, Krause expressed her belief in the civil right to protest but to not engage in violence. She also attended the second Moratorium to End the War in Vietnam demonstration in Washington, D.C. in November 1969.

Although the protests upon campus—which had begun before Krause enrolled at the university—were initially peaceful, by 1970, many of these protests had become increasingly raucous and violent, with some students committing acts of sabotage, arson, sit-in protests, and general vandalism and disruption both on and off campus. Several of these acts of protest had resulted in clashes with police and numerous arrests; this ongoing unrest had led to the Ohio Army National Guard presence at the university by the spring of 1970—to the resentment of much of the student population.

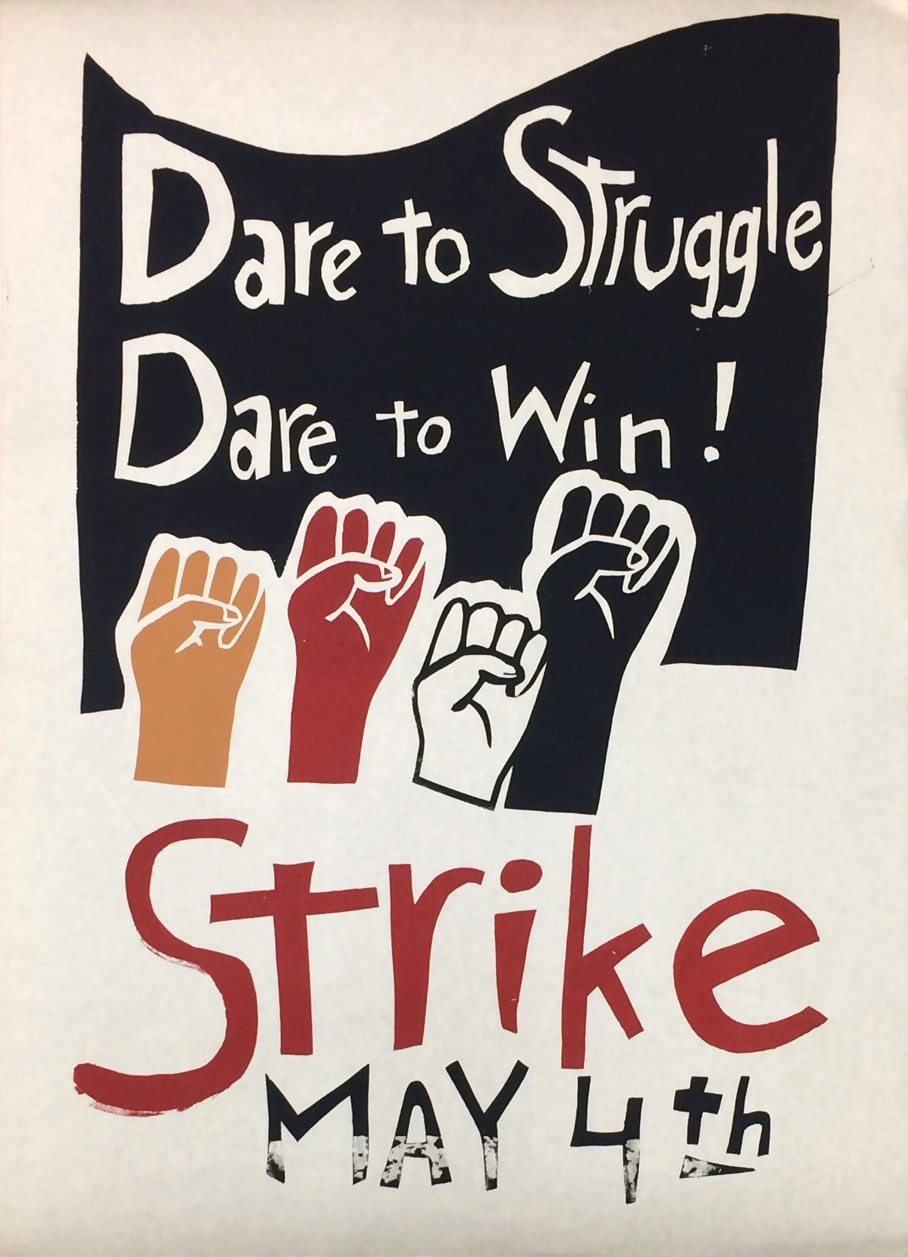
Poster calling for a nationwide student protest against the Cambodian incursion to be held on May 4, 1970—the date of the Kent State shootings

By early 1970, Krause had become disillusioned with the climate at KSU. She is known to have informed her parents and younger sister during a family visit on her 19th birthday that she found the atmosphere on campus both stifling and regimented. As such, both she and Levine planned to enroll at a university in Levine's home state of New York that summer. She is also known to have discussed her long-term ambition to relocate to Canada with Levine following their graduation, to which he was amenable.

=== May 1970 ===
On Friday, May 1, 1970, a further student protest was held upon campus in response to President Nixon's April 30 announcement of the Cambodian incursion and plans to increase conscription. The protestors also demanded the closure of the university's Reserve Officers' Training Corps (ROTC); this protest was attended by approximately 500 students and saw a symbolic burial of a copy of the United States Constitution. The demonstration saw little disruption, and ended peacefully at 3:45 p.m., with the organizers promising a further demonstration for midday on Monday, May 4; however, university officials attempted to ban this protest. (Note: University officials would distribute 12,000 leaflets across campus between May 1 and 4, informing students any further demonstrations were forbidden.)

The weekend of May 2–3 saw further disruption upon and around the university campus, including beer glasses thrown at police cars, students forming a human chain on Walter Street, blocking traffic and asking drivers their opinion of the Vietnam War, and approximately $10,000 worth of damage inflicted with acts of vandalism, looting, and arson. In response to this disruption, Mayor Leroy Statrum imposed an 11 p.m. curfew within Kent and a 1 a.m. curfew upon the campus. (Note: The 1 a.m. campus curfew would be adjusted to 9 p.m. on May 3.) This curfew was enforced in the early hours of May 2. That evening, the ROTC barracks upon campus were burned to the ground; when the fire department attempted to extinguish the blaze, their hoses were cut, forcing the Ohio Army National Guard—bayonets affixed to their rifles—to fire tear gas into the crowd and clear the campus.

The following day, the governor of Ohio, Jim Rhodes, visited KSU; he described the events of the previous two evenings as "probably the most vicious form of campus-oriented violence yet perpetrated by dissident groups and their allies in the State of Ohio ... [the perpetrators] are the worst type of people we harbor in America."

The same evening, a further demonstration was held close to the campus's iron Victory Bell. At 9 p.m., the demonstrators were told the campus curfew had been moved forward, and given five minutes to disperse. In response, some students demanded to talk with the university's president to formally present their demands: the withdrawal of the National Guard from the university campus; the lifting of the curfews; and an amnesty for all students who had been arrested. In response, sections of the Ohio Riot Laws were read to the demonstrators before several tear gas canisters were fired from helicopters hovering over the demonstration. A small number of students received bayonet wounds for refusing to disperse as ordered.

== May 3 ==
On May 3, Krause informed Levine of her belief that the weekend's escalation of disruption and sabotage on the university campus and against local business owners and proprietors was counterproductive to their anti-war objective and that these actions warranted the recent presence of the National Guard at the university campus. (Note: In her final phone call to her family on the weekend of May 2–3, Krause is known to have informed her father, Arthur, that she viewed the protesting students' recent escalating violence and sabotage as reprehensible.)

=== Flowers versus bullets conversation ===
That afternoon, Krause and Levine specifically sought to converse with several guardsmen. Reportedly, upon seeing a lone guardsman standing with a lilac sprouting from his gun, Krause tugged her boyfriend by the arm in a gesture for the two to engage in conversation with this particular soldier—according to some sources, he was a student at the University of Akron who explained his unit was unable to leave the campus. (Note: According to a May 18, 1970 Time article, several of the lower-ranking guardsmen deployed to KSU in May 1970 had only enlisted to avoid conscription and potential deployment to Vietnam.) Shortly thereafter, the guardsman was ordered by his superior to remove the "silly flower" as he engaged in affable conversation with Krause and Levine. In response, Krause caught the lilac as it fell to the ground, stating, "What's the matter with peace?" She then added: "Flowers are better than bullets."

== Kent State shootings ==
Despite the demonstration having been banned, the proposed May 4 student demonstration began at midday on May 4 as the organizers had promised. The demonstration began with the symbolic ringing of the campus's Victory Bell, with an estimated 200–300 protesters—including Allison Krause and Barry Levine—assembled around the campus Victory Bell. Approximately 1,000 other individuals were gathered upon a hill behind these demonstrators. One student delivered a short speech, several chanted anti-war slogans, some protesters carried flags, and others may have carried rocks and stones in anticipation of confrontation.

At 11:50 a.m., the first military jeep carrying members of the Ohio National Guard and a campus policeman arrived to confront the demonstrators. (Note: A subsequent commission into the Kent State shootings would reveal that each of the three National Guard units upon campus on May 4 had only had an average of three hours' sleep the evening prior.) Via a bullhorn, the policeman announced the crowd must disperse immediately, adding "This is an order!" In response, the crowd shouted chants such as "Sieg Heil" and "Pigs off campus!" At least three rocks were thrown at the jeep, with one hitting a guardsman.

=== Initial conflict ===
Shortly thereafter, grenadiers fired several tear gas canisters at the students; this initial salvo of canisters only achieved a limited effect. Furthermore, the direction of wind caused the tear gas to quickly blow away from the protestors and in the general direction of the guardsmen, who had been ordered by their commander to affix their gas masks. Levine would later recollect that, seconds after this first salvo of tear gas had been fired, he turned toward Krause to offer reassurance, only to observe that "she was crying ... but not from the [tear] gas; it was emotional."

A further salvo of canisters was soon fired into the crowd, to greater effect. The guardsmen—in pursuit of the more troublesome protesters—then marched toward a sports field enclosed by a chain-link fence, where they remained for up to ten minutes, with some removing their gas masks to facilitate breathing. According to an official FBI document, the rock-throwing to which the guardsmen were subjected reached a pinnacle during this ten-minute period. (Note: Several guardsmen are known to have suffered bruises and abrasions from rocks and other projectiles thrown at them on May 4; however, none of these individuals required hospital treatment.) Tear gas canisters were also thrown at the guardsmen, and at least three of the guardsmen threw these canisters and stones back toward the students. Several onlookers cheered at each instance the students or guardsmen threw objects at the other.

To both gloating and jeering, the guardsmen were then ordered to ascend a knoll located toward the center of the campus known to students as Blanket Hill, where several protesting students and onlookers had retreated. (Note: This group of guardsmen contained some officers; however, the contingent had no designated leader.) The surrounding crowd of students—described in one report as having formed a "broad parabola"—divided to allow the guardsmen through. Canisters of tear gas were again fired towards the students behind the guardsmen at this point. Some of these students threw the tear gas canisters back at the guardsmen; others threw rocks and stones—some of which were again thrown back toward them.

Although an estimated twenty to fifty demonstrators continued to shout obscenities and/or throw stones at the guardsmen at this point, between 100 and 200 students assembled in the Prentice Hall parking lot situated behind the guardsmen—demonstrators and onlookers alike, including Krause and Levine—had begun to proceed to their classes.

=== Shootings ===
At 12:24 p.m., as the guardsmen ascended Blanket Hill, a minimum of twenty-nine guardsmen turned to their rear and fired sixty-seven rounds of ammunition—predominantly toward the students assembled in the vicinity of the Prentice Hall parking lot—in the span of 13 seconds. Several students instinctively ran from the scene; others dropped to the ground in an effort to avoid being shot. Numerous eyewitnesses close to the guardsmen at the time they opened fire remained adamant no order was given for them to do so.

Krause was shot seconds after the guardsmen opened fire from a distance of approximately 330 feet (101 m), while attempting to seek cover with her boyfriend behind a car in the Prentice Hall parking lot. She fell on her back and died in her boyfriend's arms, after twice stating, "Barry, I'm hit!" as Levine attempted in vain to perform mouth-to-mouth resuscitation. The other students killed in the shootings were Jeffrey Glenn Miller, Sandra Lee Scheuer and William Knox Schroeder. All four were students in good standing at the university. Nine other students were also wounded, including a freshman named Dean Kahler, who was shot in the back and permanently paralyzed from the waist down.

Several uninjured students ran into nearby Dunbar, Prentice, and Taylor Halls to telephone for ambulances, which arrived minutes later, as others attempted to perform impromptu first aid.

Although the guardsmen who opened fire claimed to have done so in self-defense, in response to a perceived threat from the students, an FBI investigation into the events concluded: "The shootings were not necessary and not in order. We have some reason to believe that the claim by the National Guard that their lives were endangered by the students was fabricated subsequent to [the shootings]."

== Aftermath ==
Allison Krause was laid to rest at the Parkway Jewish Center Cemetery in Wilkins Township, Pennsylvania, on May 6, 1970. Her rose granite headstone is inscribed with her name, in both English and Hebrew, and two inscriptions: "Beloved daughter and sister" and "Flowers are better than bullets"—the words she had exchanged with an officer of the Ohio Army National Guard the day prior to her murder.

Alienation is common among all people. Many problems develop when communication between people is difficult or non-existent. It is the root of all violent outbreaks, war and all general disharmony. We live in a world with many fellow human beings and to realize that each person is not entirely alone will make alienation an obsolete human characteristic.

— Section of essay penned by Allison Krause, c. 1969.

Among those who spoke at Krause's funeral was a former high school teacher of hers, who concluded his eulogy by stating: "In her own quiet way, she symbolized the best in young people."

The Kent State shootings led to widespread protests and a significant increase in participants of the 1970 student strike, which had begun on May 1, and ultimately saw an estimated four million nationwide student participants. Over 150 universities either closed due to the strike or in solidarity and 100,000 people demonstrated in Washington, D.C. against the war on May 9. The Kent State campus remained closed for six weeks.

Many journalists and editors were bitterly critical of the actions of the National Guard. An article within Time magazine, printed one week after the shootings, described the events at Kent State thus: "When National Guardsmen fired indiscriminately into a crowd of unarmed civilians, killing four students, the bullets wounded the nation."

Although a grand jury subsequently indicted eight members of the Ohio Army National Guard in relation to their actions on May 4, 1970, U.S. District Judge Frank J. Battisti dismissed the charges against all eight individuals in November 1974, stating: "The government [has] not shown that the defendants had shot students with an intent to deprive them of specific civil rights." No member of the National Guard was ever convicted in relation to the Kent State shootings.

Krause's father, Arthur, became one of the most outspoken advocates for the truth surrounding the Kent State shootings to be revealed and justice for the wounded and bereaved. He fought a legal battle for almost ten years following the murder of his daughter and both he and other families of the deceased and wounded ultimately filed a $20 million civil lawsuit against the National Guard.

Via an out-of-court settlement on January 4, 1979, the State of Ohio issued an official 'Statement of Regret' regarding the Kent State shootings and agreed to pay the families of the slain and wounded students $675,000. The families accepted this settlement—primarily in order to assist the wounded students in paying their medical bills. The Krause family received $15,000 for the loss of their daughter and sister.

In 2010, Krause's younger sister, Laurel, co-founded the Kent State Truth Tribunal (KSTT) with documentary filmmaker Emily Kunstler. The tribunal was organized to uncover, record, and preserve the personal testimonies of witnesses, participants, and meaningfully involved individuals with regard to the Kent State shootings. (Note: One of the individuals to share his account of the May 1970 events at KSU for the KSTT in the year of the tribunal's founding was the guardsman whom Krause and Levine had observed with a single lilac sprouting from his barrel of his gun the day prior to her death and who had partly inspired Krause's memorable quote: "Flowers are better than bullets.") Laurel Krause has cited both the memories of her sister and her family's lifelong quest for truth and justice as a motivating factor for this initiative, adding her parents had hoped in vain for the truth surrounding the shootings to emerge at trial in their lifetimes. In 2020, Laurel added: "I will do this until the day I die; it was a central moment in my life. I'm standing with my sister." (Note: In 2024, Laurel Krause referenced the loss of her sister and her fellow students at the hands of the Ohio National Guard in the Kent State shootings while addressing university campus pro-Palestinian demonstrations, stating: "In 1970, failures of Kent State University leadership enabled the massacre which left 'Four Dead in Ohio', we must not repeat the horrors of Kent State 54 years later.")

== Media ==
=== Film and documentary ===
- The family of Allison Krause are one of three featured in the Paul Ronder documentary Part of the Family: A documentary which focuses upon the human cost of the Vietnam War and the repercussions of protests upon American soil. The documentary was first broadcast on May 19, 1971, and also features the families of Carmine Macedonio, a conscripted soldier who died at age 20 in Vietnam in December 1970; and 21-year-old Phillip Gibbs, one of two fatalities of the Jackson State killings.
- The 1981 docudrama Kent State is directly based on the Kent State shootings. Directed by James Goldstone, this 120-minute docudrama stars Jane Fleiss as Allison Krause.
- The Emmy Award–winning documentary Kent State: The Day The War Came Home was released in May 2000. Directed by Chris Triffo, this 47-minute documentary features interviews with several of the students injured on May 4 in addition to eyewitnesses and former guardsmen.
- Fire In the Heartland: The Kent State Story (2020), directed by Daniel Miller, is a 90-minute documentary outlining the events leading to and immediately following the Kent State shootings in addition to the contemporary social climate of America. Several students present upon campus on May 4 are among those interviewed.
- The television miniseries 13 Seconds in Kent State was released in 2021. Written and directed by Lance Nielsen, this five-part series casts Nadia Lamin as Allison Krause and contains archive footage and imagery pertaining to the events of May 4.

=== Bibliography ===
- Eszterhas, Joe; Roberts, Michael D. (1970). Thirteen Seconds; Confrontation at Kent State. New York City: Dodd, Mead Publishing. ISBN 978-0-396-06272-1.
- Giles, Robert (2020). When Truth Mattered: The Kent State Shootings 50 Years Later. Michigan: Mission Point Press. ISBN 978-1-950-65939-5.
- Gordon, William (1995). Four Dead in Ohio: Was There a Conspiracy at Kent State?. Northridge: North Ridge Books. ISBN 978-0-937-81305-8.
- Kelner, Joseph; Munves, James (2016). The Kent State Coverup. Tennessee: Open Road Distribution. ISBN 978-1-504-03683-2.
- McCoy, David B. (2017). The Kent State Shootings and What Came Before. Amazon Digital Services LLC. ISBN 978-1-973-29760-4.
- Means, Howard B. (2016). 67 Shots : Kent State and The End of American Innocence. Boston: Da Capo Press. ISBN 978-0-306-82379-4.
- Rosinsky, Natalie M. (2009). The Kent State Shootings. Worcestershire: Compass Point Books. ISBN 978-0-756-53845-3.
- Simpson, Craig; Wilson, Gregory (2016). Above the Shots: An Oral History of the Kent State Shootings. Akron: Kent State University Press. ISBN 978-1-606-35291-5.
- Whitney, R. W. (1975). The Kent State Massacre. United States: SamHar Press. ISBN 978-0-871-57221-9.

== See also ==
- List of incidents of civil unrest in the United States
- List of killings by law enforcement officers in the United States
- List of massacres in the United States
- List of National Historic Landmarks in Ohio

== Cited works and further reading ==
- Bingham, Clara (2016). Witness to the Revolution: Radicals, Resisters, Vets, Hippies, and the Year America Lost Its Mind and Found Its Soul. California: Random House Publishing Group. ISBN 978-0-679-64474-3.
- Cawthorne, Nigel; Tibballs, Geoff (1993). Killers: Contract Killers, Spree Killers, Sex Killers. The Ruthless Exponents of Murder. London: Boxtree Publishing. ISBN 0-7522-0850-0.
- Ciment, James (2015). Postwar America: An Encyclopedia of Social, Political, Cultural, and Economic History. Oxfordshire: Taylor & Francis. ISBN 978-1-317-46235-4.
