= Randy Bish =

American cartoonist

- Born: Kittanning, Pennsylvania
- Occupation: Editorial cartoonist
- Children: 5
- Awards: Golden Quill Award, 2012 Clarion Award for Editorial Cartooning, 2002 Iranial International Cartoon Contest winner

Randy Bish is an American editorial cartoonist, formerly associated with the Pittsburgh Tribune-Review. He was celebrated as the recipient of the 2012 Clarion Award for Editorial Cartooning. In addition, Bish holds a Golden Quill Award in recognition of his exceptional work in the field of cartooning, and has been honoured as a winner of the 2002 edition of the Iranian International Cartoon Contest.

Bish began working for the Pittsburgh Tribune-Review in 1985, where he drew seven weekly cartoons. In addition to the Pittsburgh Tribune-Review, his editorial cartoons have appeared in the Orlando Sentinel, the 21st Century Business Herald in China, Reakja in Poland. News programs, including Good Morning America, Fox News, C-SPAN, and CNN Headline News, have used his editorial cartoons.

His cartoons are syndicated by the Pennsylvania Newspaper Association and have been syndicated by United Media. Bish's cartoons have been published in Attack of the Political Cartoonists and The Best Political Cartoons of the Year 2005. His artwork was used for the cover of Best Editorial Cartoons of the Year in 1998.

His artwork has been featured in several art gallery exhibits, including the Charles Schulz Museum, The California Museum for History, Women and the Arts, Newseum, and Mount Vernon.
