= William Knox Schroeder =

Student killed at Kent State University in 1970

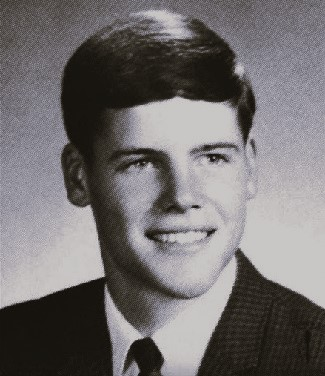
- Schroeder, c. 1968
- Born: July 20, 1950; Cincinnati, Ohio, U.S.
- Died: May 4, 1970 (aged 19); Robinson Memorial Hospital, Ravenna, Ohio, U.S. 41.1758°N 81.2489°W
- Cause of death: Gunshot wound to left back
- Resting place: Ridge Hill Memorial Park, Lorain County, Ohio, U.S. 41.41440°N 82.18310°W (approximate)
- Occupation: Student
- Known for: Victim of Kent State shootings

William Knox Schroeder (/ˈʃroʊdər/; July 20, 1950 – May 4, 1970) was a student at Kent State University, Ohio, when he was killed by Ohio National Guardsmen in the Kent State shootings.

== Background ==
Schroeder was born in Cincinnati, Ohio, the son of Florence Ella (Endebrock) and Louis Arthur Schroeder. He had an older sister, Nancy, and a younger brother, Rudy. Schroeder moved with his family to Lorain, Ohio, when he was in elementary school and graduated from Lorain High School where he was an honors student and an outstanding athlete. Already an Eagle Scout, at age 17 Schroeder applied for the Army Reserve Officer Training Corps (ROTC) Scholarship. He received the Academic Achievement award from both the Colorado School of Mines and from Kent State University, where he was a psychology student. He also earned the Association of the United States Army award for excellence in history.

== Kent State shootings and death ==
Schroeder was killed by a single shot in the chest from an M-1 Garand battle rifle. According to reports, he was not taking part in the Vietnam War protests that preceded the shootings, but simply walking between classes. He, along with Sandra Scheuer, was caught in the gunfire. His college roommate, Louis Cusella, stated that he believed Schroeder was trying to flee when shot: "Bill was 332 feet away from the nearest National Guardsman, not much of a threat. He was shot with a folder in his hand." Official reports stated that Schroeder was actually 382 feet from the National Guard at the time he was shot, while lying on the ground facing away from the Guardsmen. The bullet entered his left chest at the seventh rib, piercing his left lung, and some fragments exited from the top of his left shoulder. He died almost an hour later while in a hospital undergoing surgery. Sandra Scheuer was shot in the neck and also died. Two other students were killed in the shootings: Allison Krause and Jeffrey Miller.

The shootings led to protests and a national student strike, causing hundreds of campuses to close because of both violent and non-violent demonstrations. The Kent State campus remained closed for six weeks. Five days after the shootings, 100,000 people demonstrated in Washington, D.C. against the war.

The personal writings and effects of William Schroeder, as well as supporting material about his life, are on display in a special section at the May 4 visitor center at Kent State University as of summer 2019.
