= Brad Bumsted =

American journalist

- Occupation: Journalist
- Notable credit: Pittsburgh Tribune-Review

Brad Bumsted is a prominent journalist in Pennsylvania. Until 2016, he worked for the Pittsburgh Tribune-Review. He is noted for writing "reform-minded stories" about the Pennsylvania General Assembly.

In 2005, he was named one of "Pennsylvania's Most Influential Reporters" by the Pennsylvania political news website PoliticsPA. In 2008, the political website PolitickerPA.com named him one of the "Most Powerful Political Reporters" in Pennsylvania. The Pennsylvania Report named him to the 2009 "The Pennsylvania Report 100" list of influential figures in Pennsylvania politics and described him as a "mainstay in the halls of the capitol." In October 2016, Bumsted became Bureau Chief of The Caucus, a watchdog publication on state government owned by LNP Media Group launched in January, 2017. The weekly tabloid has won numerous state and international awards.
