= Pittsburgh Tribune-Review =

Daily newspaper in Pittsburgh, Pennsylvania

Trib Total Media
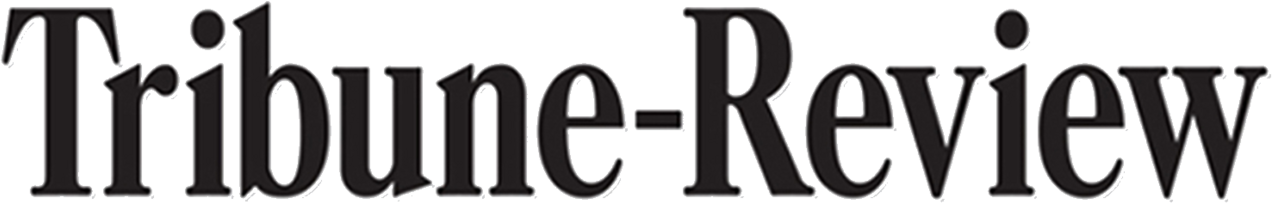

- The March 1, 2012, front page of the Pittsburgh Tribune-Review
- Type: Daily online / weekly print
- Format: Broadsheet
- Owner: Tribune-Review Publishing Company
- Publisher: Richard Mellon Scaife
- Founded: 1811 (in 1992 became metro-wide)
- Headquarters: 503 Martindale St. 3rd Floor; Pittsburgh, PA 15212; United States
- Circulation: 187,875 Daily; 202,181 Sunday (as of 2011)
- Website: triblive.com

The Pittsburgh Tribune-Review, also known as "the Trib", is the second-largest daily newspaper serving the Greater Pittsburgh metropolitan area of Western Pennsylvania. It transitioned to an all-digital format on December 1, 2016, but remains the second-largest daily in Pennsylvania, with nearly one million unique page views monthly. In January 2026, the publication announced that it would bring back a weekly print edition. Founded on August 22, 1811, as the Greensburg Gazette and consolidated with several papers into the Greensburg Tribune-Review in 1889, the paper circulated only in the eastern suburban counties of Westmoreland and parts of Indiana and Fayette until May 1992, when it began serving all of the Greater Pittsburgh metropolitan area after a strike at the two Pittsburgh dailies, the Pittsburgh Post-Gazette and The Pittsburgh Press, deprived the city of a newspaper for several months.

The Tribune-Review Publishing Company was owned by Richard Mellon Scaife, an heir to the Mellon banking, oil, and aluminum fortune, until his death in July 2014. Scaife was a major funder of conservative organizations, including the Arkansas Project. Accordingly, the Tribune-Review has maintained a conservative editorial stance, contrasting with the then-more liberal Post-Gazette before that paper's own editorial shift in 2018. In addition to its flagship paper, the company publishes 17 weekly community newspapers, the Pittsburgh Pennysaver, TribLive.com, and TribTotalMedia.com.

== History ==
=== 19th century ===
Pittsburgh's newspaper consolidation timeline

The paper began as the Gazette on August 22, 1811. After a series of name changes and mergers it became the Greensburg Daily Tribune in 1889.

=== 20th century ===
In 1924, it and the Greensburg Morning Review, launched by David J. Berry in 1903, consolidated their interests under a single ownership. Both papers continued separate publication until 1955, when they merged to form the Greensburg Tribune-Review.

Scaife acquired the Tribune-Review in 1970, a decade after trying to acquire the Post-Gazette. From 1981 to 1982, he managed a short-lived eastern suburban newspaper, The Daily-Sunday Tribune.

==== Kent State and the Pulitzer ====
The Tribune-Review owns several satellite papers that insert or surround the regional publication with neighborhood-specific stories. The Valley News Dispatch, of Pittsburgh suburbs Tarentum and New Kensington is one such satellite. Local journalism student John Filo worked for the publication while attending nearby Kent State University and served as the Valley News Dispatch's correspondent of the Kent State shootings. His photography that day has ascended to iconic status and won the newspaper its only Pulitzer Prize.

During a newspaper strike that temporarily shut down the Post-Gazette and ultimately closed the Pittsburgh Press, Scaife launched the Pittsburgh Tribune-Review, an edition of the Greensburg-based Tribune-Review covering Allegheny County and Pittsburgh. Over time, it became a stand-alone newspaper headquartered on Pittsburgh's North Side. In 1997, Scaife added to his small collection of newspapers by purchasing The Daily Courier of Connellsville, the Leader Times of Kittanning and The Valley Independent of Monessen from Thomson Newspapers.

In late 1997, Scaife's NewsWorks facility opened in the North Hills. In December 1997, the Tribune-Review company purchased the North Hills News Record, even though four months earlier, then-Trib president Ed Harrell told the Pittsburgh Business Times that the company was not interested in the News Record. Nine months after purchasing the North Hills News Record from Gannett Company, Tribune-Review Publishing Co. announced the paper would be merged with the Pittsburgh Trib. The News Record was most successful during the newspaper strike of the early 1990s.

At its demise, the North Hills News Record had a daily circulation of more than 16,000, nearly 1,000 less than its circulation before the Trib bought it. In early 2000, the Trib announced the "News Record" name would retire after more than two years of a combined "Tribune-Review/North Hills News Record" banner. North Hills coverage would be wrapped into the Trib's neighborhoods section.

=== 21st century ===
In 2000, the Trib announced it would convert its Irwin-based paper, the daily (except Sunday) Standard Observer, into a twice-weekly regional section of the Greensburg Tribune-Review. Citing a "sagging economy", the Trib laid off more than four percent of its workforce in 2003, including freelance writers. More shakeups continued in 2005 as circulation numbers dropped and a top official left. An online message board featured back and forth fights between Pittsburgh and Greensburg employees.

Edward Harrell, then-president of the Tribune-Review Publishing Company, announced in January 2005 that most of the regional editions of the paper would have their newsroom, management, and circulation departments merged, and staff reductions would follow. The merged papers include the Tribune-Review of Greensburg, the Valley News Dispatch of Tarentum, The Leader-Times of Kittanning, The Daily Courier of Connellsville and the Blairsville Dispatch. The Valley Independent, the only paper with a unionized newsroom and contract, was not affected.

The company incorporated as Trib Total Media in the summer of 2005 and purchased Gateway Newspapers, a community publication group servicing approximately 22 communities, at the time, in and around Pittsburgh's Allegheny County. The company immediately laid off two managers. The exact number of proposed redundancies was not announced. In September 2005, Harrell announced his retirement as president of Tribune-Review Publishing Company, effective December 31, 2005. He had served as president since 1989. Several staff writers were laid off in December 2005 as two of Gateway's newspapers were discontinued.

In May 2008, the Post-Gazette and the Trib reached a deal for one company to deliver both papers. The Post-Gazette would begin delivering the Trib to most of the area with some exceptions. The terms of the deal were not disclosed. On June 20, 2008, Trib Total Media publicly announced it was closing several weekly newspapers in the Gateway Newspapers chain. The papers affected include: Bridgeville Area News, North Journal, McKnight Journal, Woodland Progress, Penn Hills Progress, Coraopolis-Moon Record and the Advance Leader. Many of those papers were several decades old.

The company also announced major changes to the remaining Gateway publications including a revamp of the Pennysaver in the communities that have Gateway newspapers. Several published reports say the remaining community newspapers would expand coverage to include areas no longer serviced by Gateway publications. Other Gateway newspapers will now serve the communities served by those titles.

In November 2015, Trib Total Media announced that they would be cutting back on home delivery of printed newspapers and emphasize digital delivery. The restructuring included the sale of two dailies and six weeklies to West Penn Media.

Two papers were closed, The Daily News in McKeesport, and The Valley Independent in Monessen.

The remaining papers, in Pittsburgh, Greensburg, and Tarentum, became regional editions of a single title, the Tribune-Review. Home delivery was reduced in some parts of Allegheny and Westmoreland counties. Trib Total Media laid off 153 full and part-time workers from its staff of approximately 1,100, another 68 had accepted buyouts in October.

The Pittsburgh edition of the Tribune-Review went all-digital after publishing its last print edition on November 30, 2016. The Greensburg-based Westmoreland edition and the Tarentum-based Valley News Dispatch edition remained in print.

== Investigations and controversies ==
The Pittsburgh Tribune-Review, through reporter Chris Ruddy, was heavily involved in spreading rumors about the death of Vincent Foster, an aide to the Bill Clinton administration. The Clinton White House had commissioned a report entitled the "Communication stream of conspiracy commerce" which came to light in 2014.

Carl Prine, an investigative reporter for the newspaper, conducted a probe with the CBS news magazine 60 Minutes that highlighted the lack of security at the nation's most dangerous chemical plants following the September 11, 2001, attacks.

The reporters, and a CBS camera operator, were charged with trespassing at a Neville Island plant during their investigation. They were later acquitted when the judge accepted that the story had been in the public interest.

In 2007, Prine's further investigation into the subject was featured in the PBS documentary series Exposé: America's Investigative Reports, in a two-part episode titled "Think Like A Terrorist".

One Tribune-Review flap went national when Colin McNickle, then editor of the newspaper's editorial page, attended a July 26, 2004 speech at the Massachusetts State House given by Teresa Heinz Kerry, who had been the subject of two negative articles in the Tribune-Review's opinion pages. After the speech, there was a dispute between McNickle and Heinz Kerry over her use of the term "un-American activity".

== Circulation ==
The daily Tribune-Review is published in three geographic editions: Pittsburgh, Westmoreland, and Valley News Dispatch.

The Tribune-Review claimed to show the highest gains in readership over the past five years of any newspaper in America's top 48 markets, which were dominated by sinking readership. The growth can be attributed to purchases of other newspapers, which were then reclassified as editions of the Tribune-Review. This idea was proposed to Scaife and Ralph Martin by David Horchak, the Circulation Director of The Valley News Dispatch. Taking advantage of ABC rules that allowed declaring newspapers to include all circulation of a newspaper to be declared editions of a main newspaper. This did not keep David Horchak on when the Tribune-Review decided to have just two circulation directors after personnel cuts.

According to surveys by International Demographics Inc., an independent media research firm in Houston, the number of Tribune-Review readers jumped 17.8 percent from 2007 to 2012.

As part of the Trib Total Media conglomerate, the Tribune-Review has a news exchange partnership with WPXI, Pittsburgh's NBC affiliate. Until 2013, it was a sister publication to Pittsburgh's second-largest news radio station, KQV. Trib Total Media is the Official Newspaper of the Pittsburgh Pirates and the Pittsburgh Penguins (the latter of which Scaife was a co-founder in 1967). It has strong partnerships with many nonprofit and community businesses and organizations throughout Western Pennsylvania.

== See also ==
- Arkansas Project
- Brad Bumsted
- Randy Bish
- Pittsburgh Post-Gazette
