= Prine =

Prine is a surname of either English or French (derived from Perrin) origin. Notable people with the surname include:

- Andrew Prine (1936–2022), American actor
- Barney Prine (1841–1919), founder of the city of Prineville, Oregon which was originally named Prine
- Carl Prine (born 1966), American military investigative reporter
- John Prine (1946–2020), American singer-songwriter
- Linda Prine, American family physician and non-profit founder
