= University Hospitals Portage Medical Center =

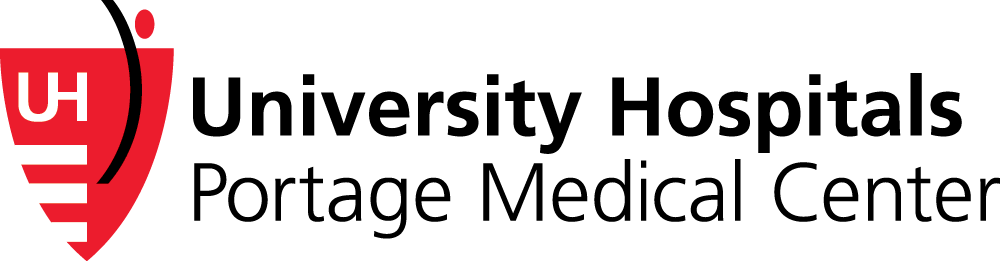

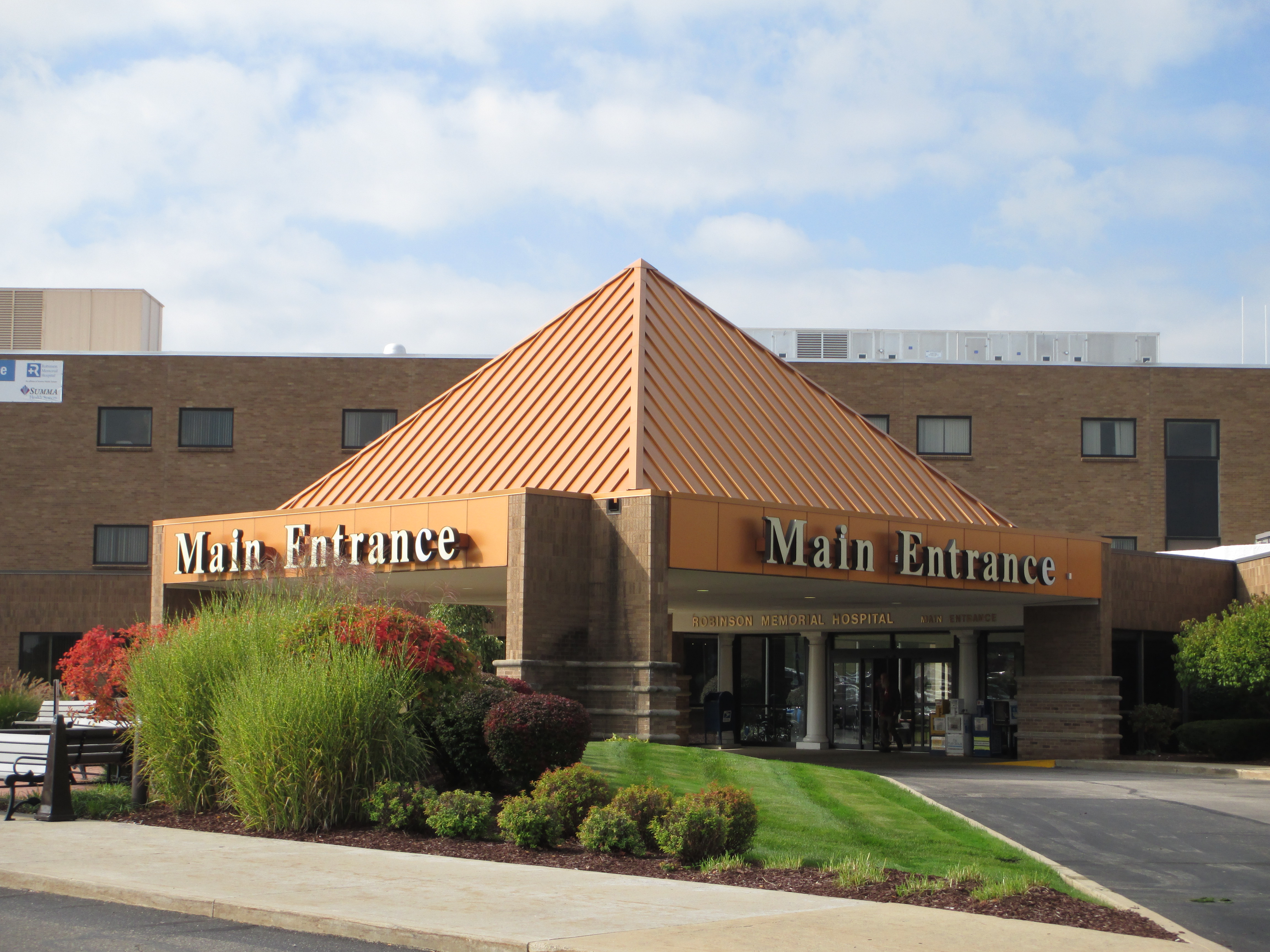
- Main entrance

- Location in Ohio

Geography
- Location: 6847 North Chestnut Street, Ravenna, Ohio, United States
- Coordinates: 41.1758°N 81.2489°W

Services
- Emergency department: Level III trauma center
- Beds: 117

History
- Founded: 1894

Links
- Website: www.uhhospitals.org/locations/uh-portage-medical-center
- Lists: Hospitals in Ohio

University Hospitals Portage Medical Center is a 117-staffed-bed hospital located in Ravenna, Ohio, United States, that serves the residents of Portage County and surrounding communities. Affiliated with University Hospitals of Cleveland, the hospital includes an urgent care facility, surgery center, comprehensive imaging facilities, and a network of physician practices. It offers surgical, women's and emergency services, as well as cancer and respiratory care. It was founded in 1894 as White Hospital and became the Portage County Hospital in 1917. From 1932 to 2015 it was known as Robinson Memorial Hospital.

UH Portage Medical Center is recognized as one of the best places to work in Northeast Ohio by the Employers Resource Council since 2003 and has been re-designated as a Magnet hospital by the American Nurses Credentialing Center. Magnet recognizes quality patient care and nursing excellence and provides consumers with the ultimate benchmark to measure the quality of care they can expect to receive.

In 2012, the hospital received Medical Excellence Awards from The Delta Group CareChex Quality Rating System in the categories of cardiac care, women's health and overall medical care. In that same year, it also obtained a three-year re-accreditation Joint Commission on the Accreditation of Healthcare Organizations for home health, hospice and all ambulatory sites.

== Recognition and honors ==
- Designated as a Magnet Hospital.
- Received Medical Excellence Awards from The Delta Group CareChex Quality Rating System in the categories of cardiac care, women’s health and overall medical care.
- Obtained accreditation from the Joint Commission, including home health, hospice and all ambulatory sites.
