= Sandra Lee Scheuer =

Student killed at Kent State University in 1970

Sandra Scheuer
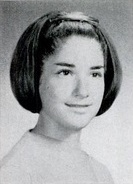
- Scheuer c. 1967
- Born: Sandra Lee Scheuer; August 11, 1949; Youngstown, Ohio, US
- Died: May 4, 1970 (aged 20); Kent State University, Kent, Ohio, US; 41.1501°N 81.3433°W
- Cause of death: Gunshot wound to neck
- Resting place: Ohev Tzedek Cemetery, Mahoning County, Ohio, U.S. 41.0608°N 80.7119°W (approximate)
- Occupation: Student
- Known for: Victim of Kent State shootings

Sandra Lee "Sandy" Scheuer (/ˈʃɔɪ.ər/; August 11, 1949 – May 4, 1970) was an American student at Kent State University in Kent, Ohio, when she was killed by Ohio National Guardsmen in the Kent State shootings.

== Background ==
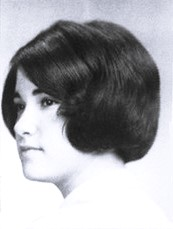
Scheuer, pictured in 1965

Scheuer was born in Youngstown, Ohio, the daughter of Sarah (Lacko) and Martin Scheuer. She had an older sister, Audrey. She was Jewish. She was an honors student in speech therapy, and was a graduate of Boardman High School.

== May 4, 1970 ==
Scheuer did not take part in the Vietnam War protests that preceded the shootings. She was shot once in the neck with an M-1 rifle from a distance of 130 yards (119 m) while walking between classes. The bullet severed her jugular vein and she died within five or six minutes from loss of blood. According to the account of her boyfriend Bruce Burkland, Scheuer "was walking with one of her speech and hearing therapy students across the green. Caught in the gunfire, neither Sandra nor the young man had anything to do with the assembly of students on the green." Three other unarmed students were also killed in the shootings: Allison Krause, Jeffrey Miller, and William Knox Schroeder.

The shootings led to protests and a national student strike, causing hundreds of campuses to close because of both violent and non-violent demonstrations. The Kent State campus remained closed for six weeks. Five days after the shootings, 100,000 people demonstrated in Washington, D.C., against the war.

Scheuer had been a member of the Alpha Xi Delta sorority, and current members of this sorority speak in her memory each year on the Kent State University campus at the May 4 Task Force's commemoration of the 1970 tragedy.

In 2018 an exhibit in memory of Scheuer called "Sandy's Scrapbook", based on an actual scrapbook she kept while attending Kent State, opened at the University's May 4 Visitor Center.

== In popular culture ==
Just after Scheuer's death, the songwriter Harvey Andrews composed a song titled "Hey Sandy", whose lyrics are addressed to her:

Did you see them turn, did you feel the burn
Of the bullets as they flew?

In the song "Ohio", which was written immediately after the shootings, folk rocker Neil Young made a reference to Scheuer in the chorus:

What if you knew her,
And found her dead on the ground?
How can you run when you know?

While unconfirmed, it’s been speculated the Polaris song "Hey Sandy", the theme song to the show The Adventures of Pete & Pete, is a reference to Scheuer with lyrics regarding shooting and having picked a target.

Scheuer is also remembered in poet Gary Geddes' poem "Sandra Lee Scheuer", found in his 1980 collection The Acid Test. An image of a memorial to Scheuer was included in the CD case to The Argument (2001) by Fugazi.
